= List of people from Huntington, West Virginia =

This is a list of people who were born in, lived in, or are closely associated with the city of Huntington, West Virginia, also known as Huntingtonians.

== Athletics ==
=== Basketball ===
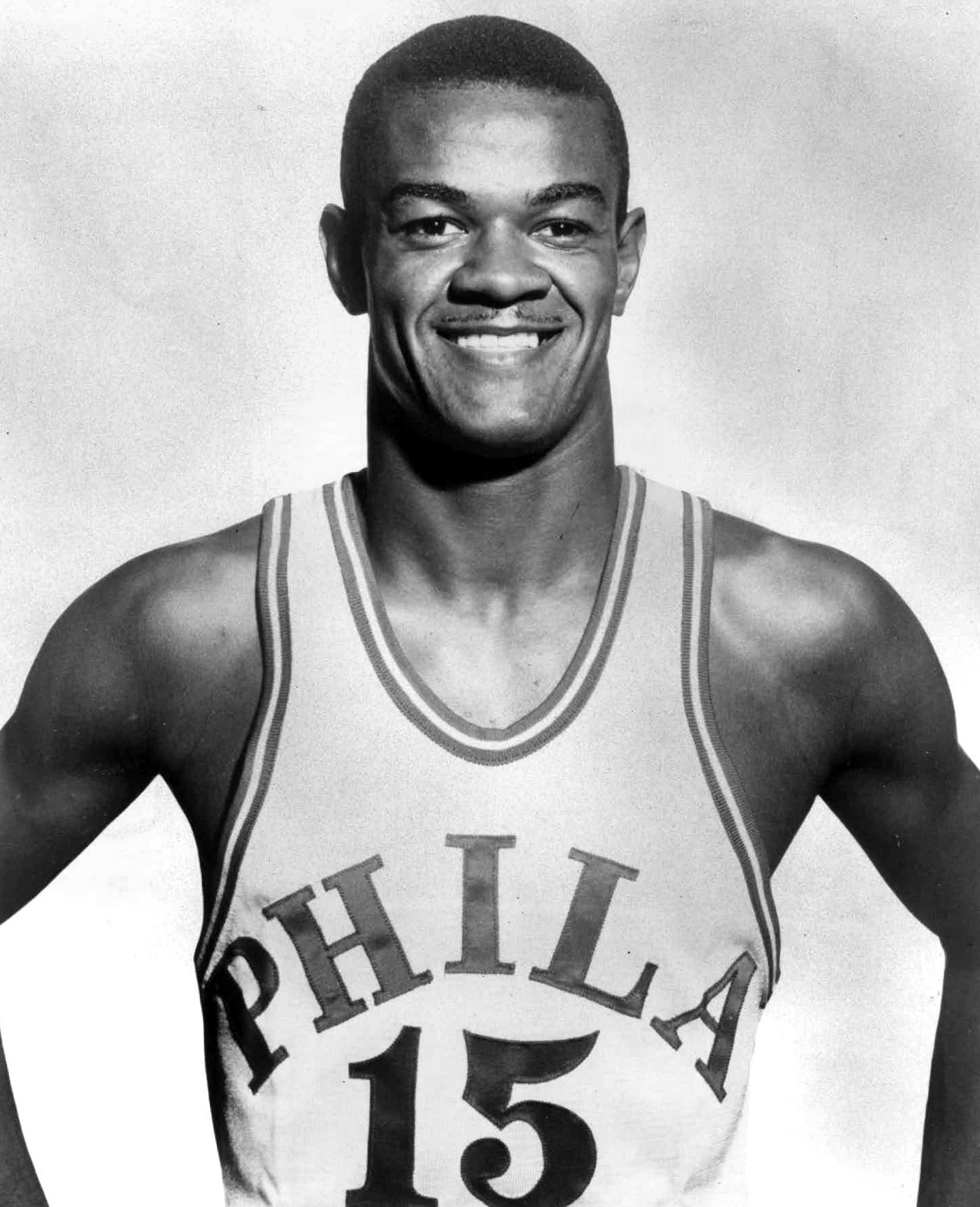
Hal Greer

- Sim Bhullar, center for Tainan TSG GhostHawks of the T1 League, attended Huntington Prep School
- Onuralp Bitim, small forward for Chicago Bulls, attended Huntington Prep School
- Miles Bridges, current shooting guard for Charlotte Hornets, attended Huntington Prep School
- Thomas Bryant, center for Cleveland Cavaliers
- Leo Byrd, gold medalist at the 1959 Pan American Games for basketball
- Dan D'Antoni, former basketball coach for Marshall University
- Mike D'Antoni, former NBA coach for Houston Rockets, Los Angeles Lakers, New York Knicks, Denver Nuggets, Phoenix Suns
- Bob Davis, former coach of High Point Panthers men's basketball
- Gorgui Dieng, former NBA power forward, attended Huntington Prep School
- Tavian Dunn-Martin, CEBL point guard
- Hal Greer, former NBA shooting guard for Philadelphia 76ers, 10-time NBA All-Star, 7-time All-NBA Second Team, 50 Greatest Players in NBA History, the NBA 75th Anniversary Team, his uniform number was among Philadelphia 76ers retired numbers, Basketball Hall of Fame member
- Marshall Hawkins, retired NBA basketball forward
- Jonathan Kuminga, power forward for Golden State Warriors, attended Huntington Prep School
- Freddie Lewis, former point guard for Sacramento Kings
- O. J. Mayo, former University of Southern California and Milwaukee Bucks basketball player
- Patrick Patterson, former University of Kentucky, former Oklahoma City Thunder basketball player
- Josh Perkins, point guard for Petkim Spor of the Turkish Basketball Super League, attended Huntington Prep School
- Joshua Primo, former shooting guard for San Antonio Spurs, attended Huntington Prep School
- Xavier Rathan-Mayes, point guard for Merkezefendi Bld. Denizli Basket of the Turkish Basketball Super League, attended Huntington Prep School
- Bill Strickling, former head coach of Marshall College men's basketball
- JT Thor, power forward for Charlotte Hornets, attended Huntington Prep School
- Bill Walker, former Kansas State and Miami Heat basketball player
- Henry Walker, small forward for Gladiadores de Anzoátegui
- Stewart Way, former men's basketball coach for Marshall University
- Andrew Wiggins, former NBA first overall pick, current small forward for the Miami Heat, attended Huntington Prep School

=== Baseball ===
- Jon Adkins, former Major League Baseball (MLB) pitcher, played for the Chicago White Sox, San Diego Padres, New York Mets, and Cincinnati Reds 2003–2008, MLB scout for the Los Angeles Dodgers
- Jack Cook, former baseball coach for Marshall University, namesake for Jack Cook Field
- Johnson Fry, former MLB pitcher, Cleveland Indians
- Joe Hague, former Major League Baseball first baseman
- Rick Reed, former Major League Baseball pitcher and 2-time All-Star
- Frank Reiber, former MLB catcher
- John Scheneberg, former MLB pitcher
- Skeeter Shelton, former MLB outfielder
- C. Noel Workman, former coach for Iowa State Cyclones baseball
- Hoge Workman, former MLB relief pitcher, former NFL Quarterback for Cleveland Bulldogs and Cleveland Indians
- Steve Yeager, former Major League Baseball catcher, co-MVP of 1981 World Series

=== Football ===
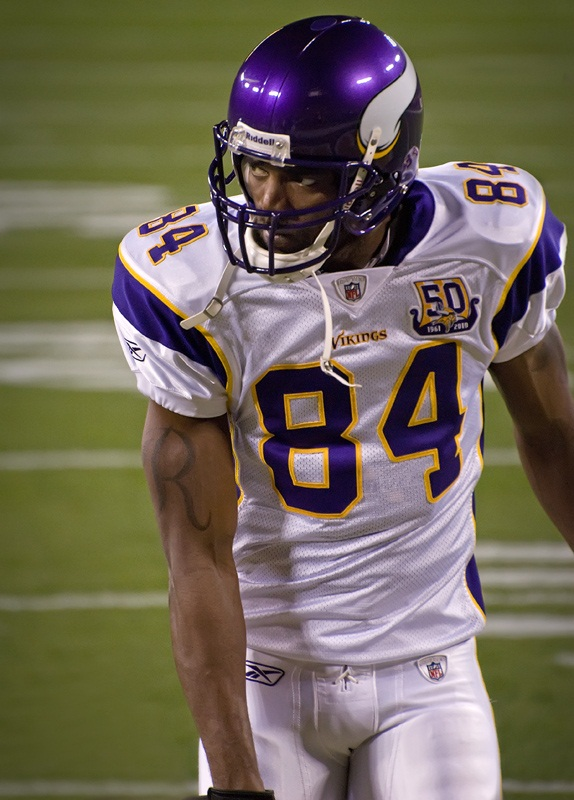
Randy Moss

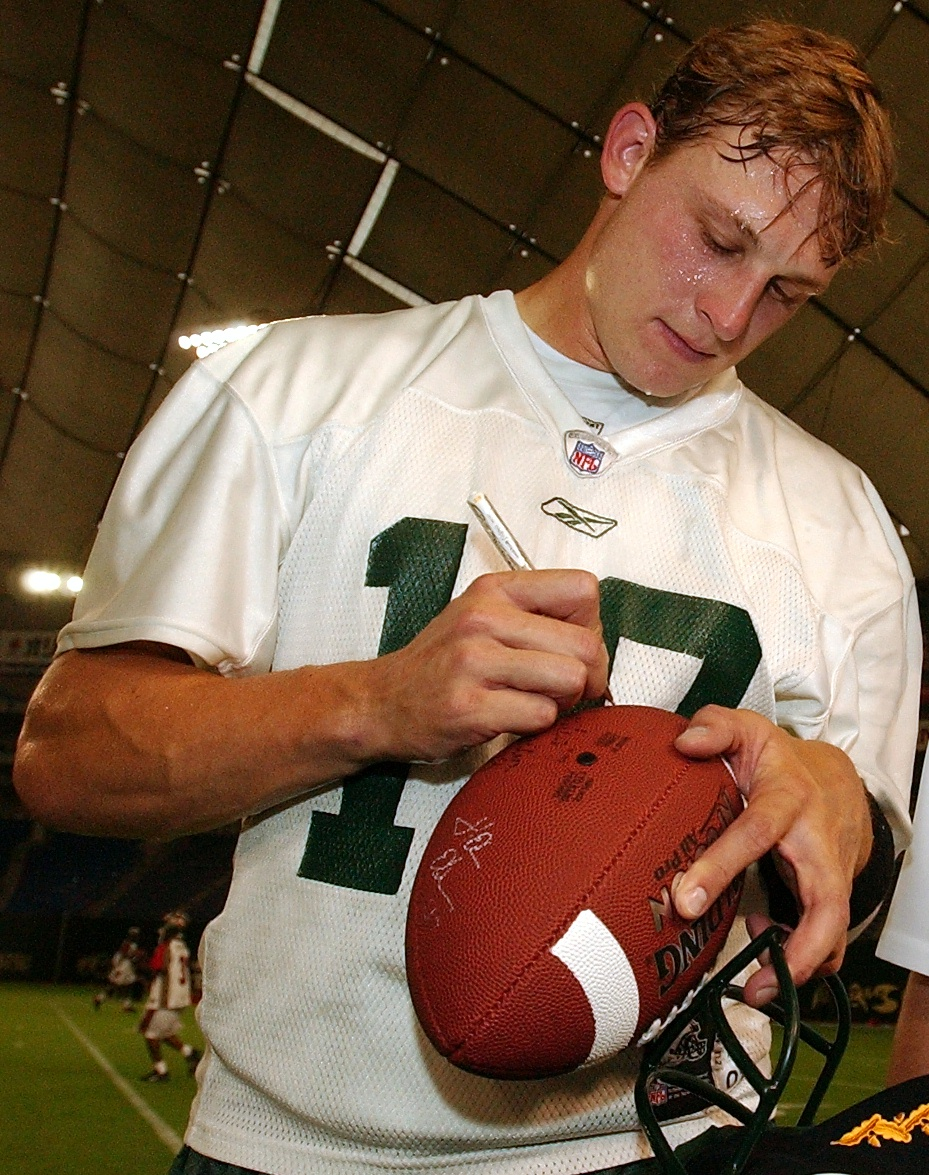
Chad Pennington

- Mike Bartrum, Pro Bowl long snapper, Philadelphia Eagles, New England Patriots, Green Bay Packers and Kansas City Chiefs, retired 2007, Marshall University Athletic Hall of Fame; became head coach Meigs (Ohio) High School in 2012 (where he played in high school) and county commissioner for Meigs Co.
- John Brickels, former high school, college and professional football coach; backfield coach for the Cleveland Browns 1946–1948
- Troy Brown, coach and former player; skill development and kick and punt returners coach for the New England Patriots of the National Football League; 3× Super Bowl champion (XXXVI, XXXVIII, XXXIX)
- Gene Corum former football coach for West Virginia University
- Larry Coyer, NFL and college football coach, defensive co-ordinator with the Indianapolis Colts
- Melvin Cunningham, former NFL defensive specialist for Miami Dolphins
- Jim Grobe, college football coach, Baylor, Wake Forest, Ohio
- Charlie Honaker, former NFL halfback for Cleveland Bulldogs
- Jackie Hunt, former NFL halfback for the Chicago Bears, College Football Hall of Fame member
- Ramey Hunter, former NFL defensive end for Portsmouth Spartans
- Harry Jones, former NFL running back
- Jack Morlock, former NFL Halfback for Detroit Lions
- Randy Moss, Pro Football Hall of Fame Class of 2018, five-time Pro Bowl receiver; holds the single-season record for receiving touchdowns by a rookie with 17; holds the single-season record for receiving touchdowns with 23; second all-time in receiving TD's with 156, trailing only Jerry Rice; Minnesota Vikings (1998 first round, #21 pick), Oakland Raiders, New England Patriots, Tennessee Titans and San Francisco 49ers
- Hank Norton, former coach for Ferrum College football
- Buzz Nutter, former NFL center, Pittsburgh Steelers & Baltimore Ravens
- Bob Orders, former NFL center, Green Bay Packers
- Gerad Parker, head coach for Troy Trojans football
- Chad Pennington, former NFL quarterback, Miami Dolphins and New York Jets, 2000–2010 (first round, #12 pick); FOX NFL analyst, 2012; Marshall Hall of Fame
- Joe Scelfo, offensive coordinator for East Tennessee State Buccaneers football
- Mark Snyder, former coach for Marshall University football
- Jason Starkey, former NFL Center for Arizona Cardinals
- Robert Walker, former NFL running back for New York Giants
- Darnell Wright, five-star football recruit and 10th overall pick in the 2023 NFL draft

=== Olympics ===
- Ken Chertow, U.S. Olympic freestyle wrestler at the 1988 Summer Olympics
- James Kreglo, former U.S. Olympic foil and sabre
- Kayla Williams, U.S. gymnast, world vault gold medalist

=== Soccer ===
- Miko Alley, former soccer player for Philippines women's national football team
- Chris Grassie, current D1 NCAA Champion coach of Marshall Thundering Herd men's soccer (2017–present)
- Chase Harrison, former MLS goalkeeper

=== Other ===
- Jason Butcher, mixed martial artist currently competing in the Light Heavyweight division of the Professional Fighters League
- William C. Campbell, former two-time president of the United States Golf Association and one-time captain of The Royal and Ancient Golf Club of St Andrews, inducted to the World Golf Hall of Fame in 1990
- Whitney Agee Hollman, gold medalist at the International Cheer Union world championships and four-time Universal Cheerleaders Association title winner
- Jeff Morrison, 1999 NCAA Tennis Singles Champion for the Florida Gators
- Johnny Sias, former professional disc golfer

== Academics ==
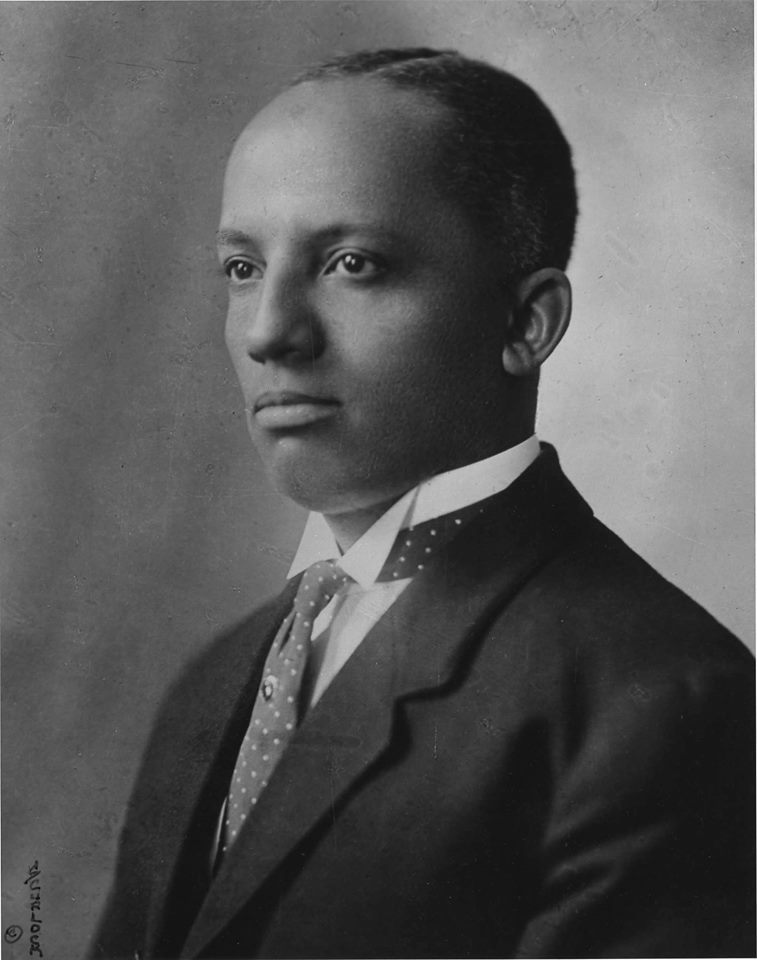
Carter G. Woodson

- Theodore W. Allen, independent scholar, writer, and activist, best known for his pioneering writings since the 1960s on white skin privilege and the origin of white identity
- Ancella Bickley, former historian, vice president of academic affairs at West Virginia State University
- Robert L. Chapman, former professor of English literature who edited several dictionaries and thesauri
- Benjamin Cornwell, professor of sociology at Cornell University, works on methods to study issues involving social inequality, the epidemic spread of disease, and collective behavior
- Saralyn R. Daly, former writer and translator, Harold Morton Landon Translation Award recipient
- Memphis Tennessee Garrison, activist for African Americans and young women during the Jim Crow Era in rural West Virginia
- Sarah Einstein, essayist and writer of memoir and literary nonfiction; recipient of the Association of Writers & Writing Programs Award for Creative Nonfiction, and the Pushcart Prize
- William Thomas Hagan, history professor at the University of Oklahoma, author
- Herb H. Henderson, civil rights activist, former president of the West Virginia National Association for the Advancement of Colored People
- Jacqueline Jackson, author and peace activist
- Kenneth P. Johnson, best known for his efforts in the 1970s and 1980s to build the Dallas Times Herald into one of the nation's most respected newspapers, which ultimately failed when the paper was purchased by its rival The Dallas Morning News in 1991 and promptly shut down
- Eddie King, former athletic director for Morris Harvey College
- James Lockhart, historian of colonial Spanish America, especially the Nahua people and Nahuatl language
- John Rudnicki, former engineering professor
- James H. Smylie, professor of Church History at Union Theological Seminary & Presbyterian School of Christian Education and author of books on American church history and presbyterianism
- Harold H. Thompson, anarchist activist and prisoner
- Carter G. Woodson, peace activist, founder of Black History Month
- Bessie Woodson Yancey former, teacher, and activist, whose only published poetry collection, 1939's Echoes from the Hills, was "perhaps the earliest example of Affrilachian children's literature"

== Arts & entertainment ==
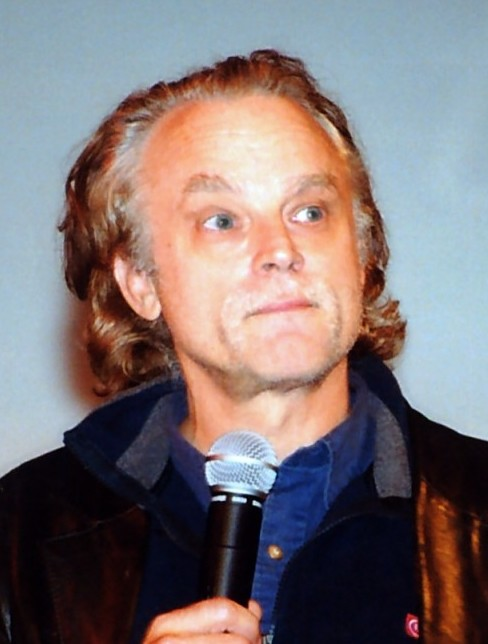
Brad Dourif

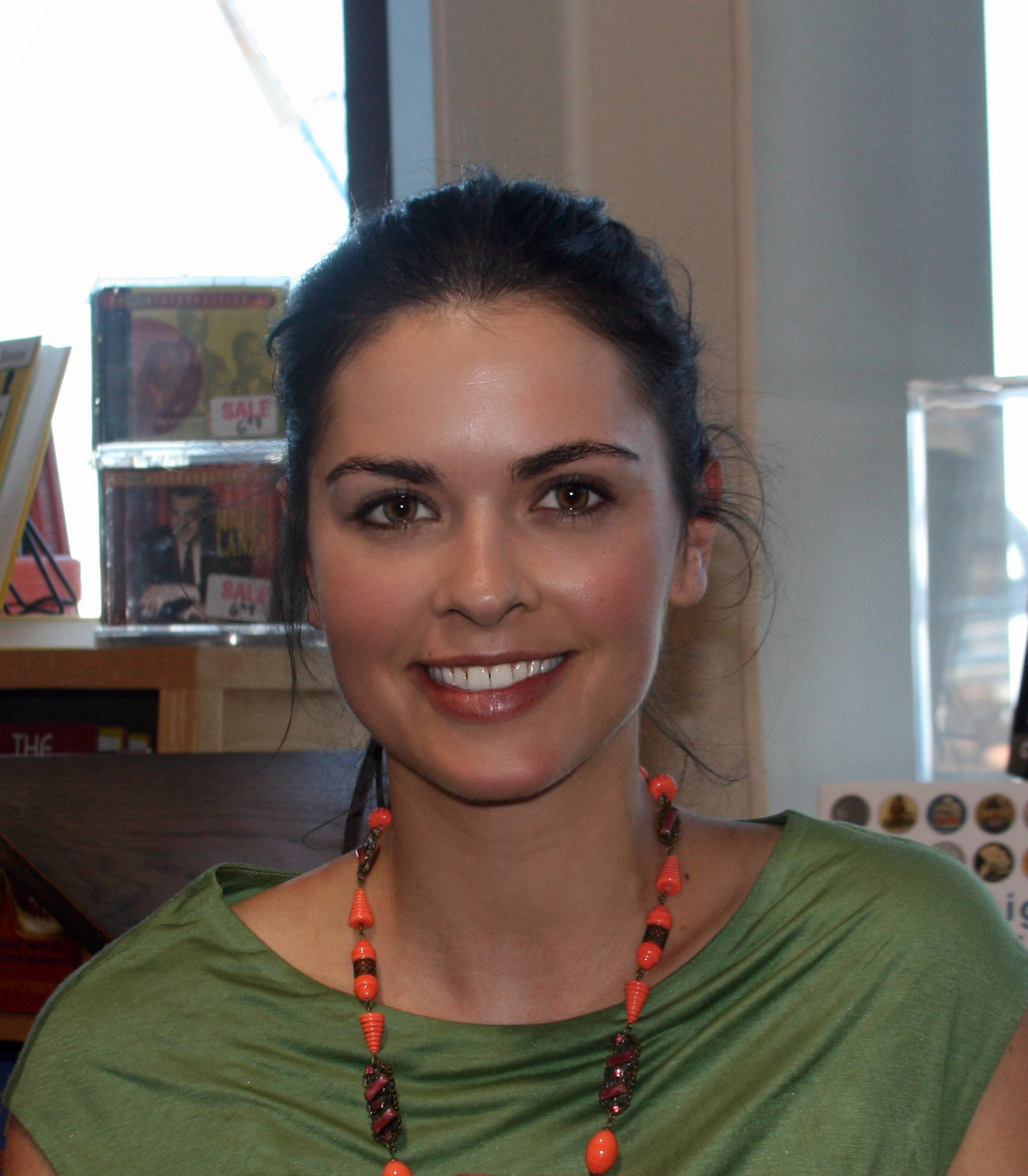
Katie Lee

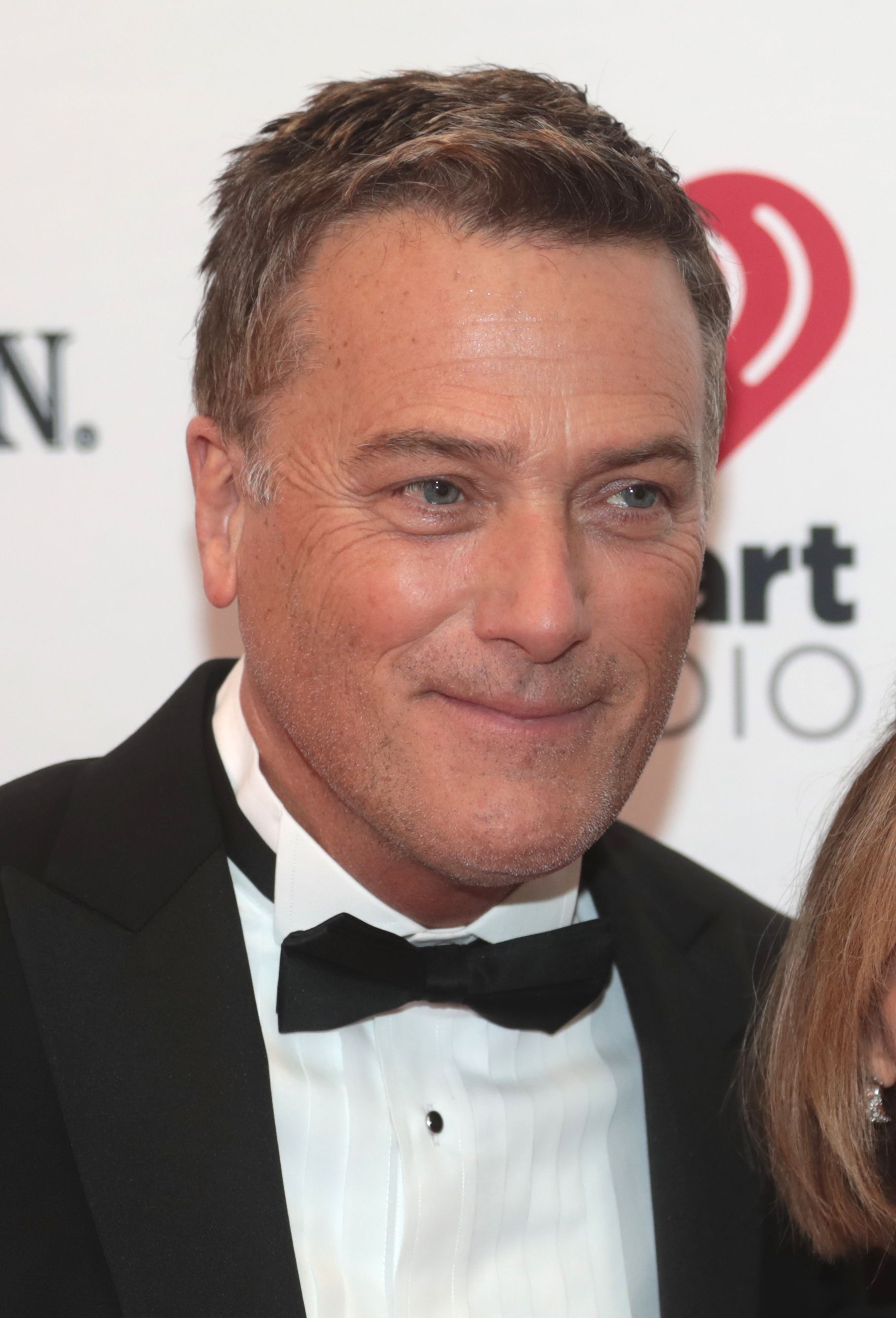
Michael W. Smith

- Tina Williams Brewer, quilting artist, recognized for story quilts about African American history
- Darwin Bromley, former attorney and game designer who worked primarily on board games
- Virginia Lewis, stage name Dagmar, 1950s television personality
- Diamond Teeth Mary, blues singer
- Brad Dourif, voice of Chucky in the Child's Play franchise (1988–present), portraying Gríma Wormtongue in The Lord of the Rings film series and his Oscar-nominated role as Billy Bibbit in One Flew Over the Cuckoo's Nest (1975)
- Joanne Dru, film and television actress, known for such films as Red River, She Wore a Yellow Ribbon, All the King's Men, and Wagon Master
- Frank Fairfax, organizer of Philadelphia's Protective Union Local 274 (1935–1971), a charter of the American Federation of Musicians (AFM/AFofM) for black musicians
- Ernie Farrow, jazz bassist who occasionally played other instruments; half-brother of Alice Coltrane
- Anna Fitziu, soprano opera singer, roles included Fiora in L'amore dei tre re, Mimi in La bohème, Nedda in Pagliacci, and the title roles in Isabeau, Madama Butterfly, and Tosca
- Joshua Harto, actor, television producer and writer
- Hawkshaw Hawkins, country music singer
- Jule Huffman, former weatherman, voice-over announcer, director and children's show host; host of WSAZ's Mr. Cartoon 1969–1995
- Revella Hughes, singer, musician and recording artist; one of the best known and most successful African-American sopranos of the first half of the 20th century
- Jennings Harold Lane, former Southern Gospel singer, co-founder of The Gospel Harmony Boys
- Elizabeth Lawrence, actress, best known for her role as Myra Murdock Sloane on the soap opera All My Children 1979–1991
- Katie Lee, food critic, chef, celebrity, and television personality
- A. C. Lyons, former architect
- Craig Johnson, novelist
- Shane Keister, studio musician, writer, arranger, and producer
- Julia Keller, journalist, author, Pulitzer Prize recipient
- Betina Krahn, RITA Award-winning and New York Times best-selling author of historical romance novels
- Tom Kromer, writer, mostly known for Waiting for Nothing (1935), a semi-autobiographical novel of vagrant or hobo life during the Great Depression
- Donal Leace, musician and educator
- Loretta C. Manggrum, also known as L.C. Manggrum, pianist, music educator, and composer of sacred music; known for her cantatas and other choral works
- Peter Marshall, actor, singer, television personality, and game show host
- Clint McElroy, radio personality and podcaster, The Adventure Zone
- Griffin McElroy, podcaster, voice actor, listed as a Forbes "30 Under 30" media luminary in 2017, co-founder of Polygon
- Justin McElroy, journalist and podcaster, My Brother, My Brother and Me, The Adventure Zone, and Sawbones, co-founder of Polygon
- Sydnee McElroy, podcaster, Sawbones
- Travis McElroy, podcaster and voice actor
- Brooklyn Nelson, Broadway actress
- Lew Payton, film actor, stage performer, and writer known for several films and stage productions including Chocolate Dandies with Josephine Baker, Smash Your Baggage (1932), Jezebel (1938), On Such a Night (1937), and Lady for a Night (1942)
- Curtis Bill Pepper, journalist and author
- Soupy Sales, comedian, actor, radio/television personality
- Billy Scott, R&B singer, lead vocalist for the group The Prophets, later known as "The Georgia Prophets", and eventually "Billy Scott & The Party Prophets"
- Sgt. Slaughter, known for his appearances in WWE and G.I. Joe
- Beau Smith, comic book writer and columnist, best known for his work for DC Comics, Image Comics, and IDW Publishing; vice president of marketing for Eclipse Comics
- Michael W. Smith, musician, charted in contemporary Christian and mainstream, 3x Grammy winner, 54x Dove Award winner, artist behind "Place in This World"
- Martha Stephens, film writer and director
- The Gospel Harmony Boys, a southern gospel quartet
- Noah Thompson, singer who won the twentieth season of American Idol
- Jim Thornton, radio and television announcer, news anchor, and voice actor; known for his voiceover work in video games, movies and television shows; since 2011, the announcer of Wheel of Fortune following the death of longtime announcer Charlie O'Donnell
- Tonja Walker, actress and singer, former beauty pageant titleholder, has competed in the Miss USA pageant

== Business ==
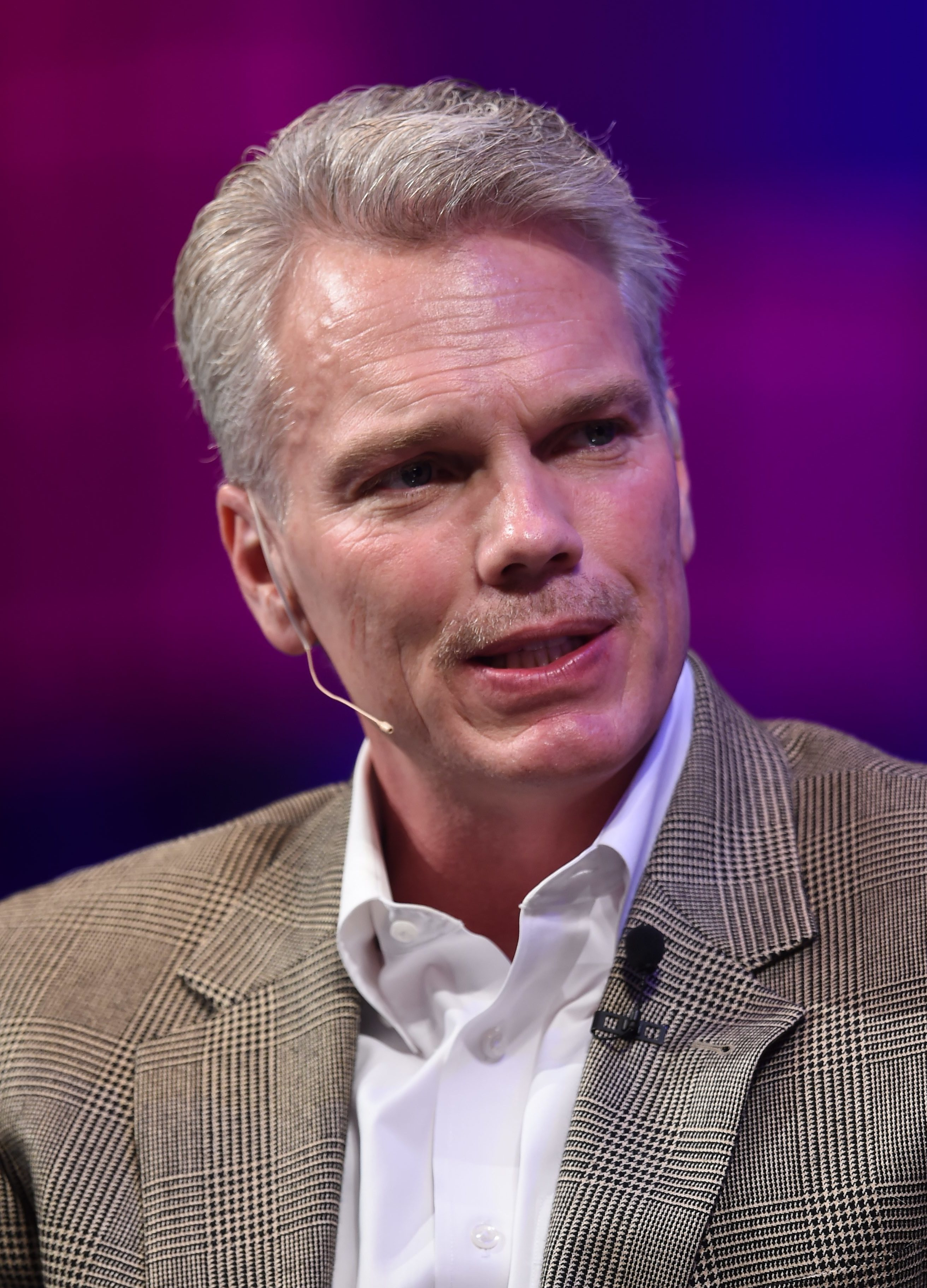
Brad D. Smith

- Peter Beter, former attorney and financier
- Joan C. Edwards, singer, entrepreneur
- Bruce R. Evans, venture capitalist, corporate director and philanthropist
- David Ginsburg, presidential adviser, executive director of Kerner Commission
- William Hope Harvey, health resort owner best remembered as a prominent public intellectual advancing the idea of monetary bimetallism, owner of Harvey House
- Dwight Morrow, businessman, politician, and diplomat
- Collis Potter Huntington, former industrialist and railway magnate; one of the Big Four of western railroading (along with Leland Stanford, Mark Hopkins, and Charles Crocker) who invested in Theodore Judah's idea to build the Central Pacific Railroad as part of the first U.S. transcontinental railroad
- Brad D. Smith, former CEO of Intuit (2008-2018), president of Marshall University, current Amazon board of directors, as a member of the audit committee, the current richest person in West Virginia
- Ruth C. Sullivan, co-founder of Autism Society of America and of Autism Services Center in Huntington

== Politics ==
- Michael Amos, West Virginia House of Delegates, from the 27th district
- David Martin Baker, former West Virginia House of Delegates
- Homer S. Brown, former Pennsylvania House of Representatives
- Peter Cline Buffington, first mayor of Huntington
- Franklin Cleckley, former justice of the Supreme Court of Appeals of West Virginia
- Henry Dillon, West Virginia House of Delegates
- Sarah Drennan, West Virginia House of Delegates, from the 20th district
- Paul T. Farrell, former circuit judge and justice of the Supreme Court of Appeals of West Virginia
- Paul T. Farrell Jr., attorney, candidate for president of the United States in the 2016 West Virginia Democratic primary
- David Felinton, former mayor of Huntington
- Scott Fuller, West Virginia Senate, from the 5th district
- Monte Geralds, former Michigan House of Representatives
- Eustace Gibson, former United States House of Representatives for West Virginia's 4th congressional district
- Henry D. Hatfield, former governor of West Virginia
- Homer Heck, former West Virginia House of Delegates
- Charles B. Hoard, former United States House of Representatives for New York's 23rd congressional district, buried at Spring Hill Cemetery
- Sean Hornbuckle, minority leader of the West Virginia House of Delegates
- James A. Hughes, former U.S. House of Representatives for West Virginia, buried at Spring Hill Cemetery
- DuRon Jackson, West Virginia Senate
- Evan Jenkins, former state senator, congressman, and West Virginia Supreme Court justice
- Patrick Lucas, West Virginia House of Delegates
- Thomas Massie, U.S. representative for Kentucky
- Justin Marcum, former West Virginia House of Delegates
- Carol Miller, U.S. representative from WV-1st Congressional District
- Will E. Neal, former mayor of Huntington, United States House of Representatives
- Chris Perkins, former Kentucky member of the U.S. House of Representatives, former pastor of Enslow Park Presbyterian Church
- Robert H. Plymale, minority whip of the West Virginia Senate
- Doug Reynolds, former West Virginia House of Delegates
- Matthew Rohrbach, West Virginia House of Delegates
- Whitney North Seymour Jr., former United States attorney for the Southern District of New York, and New York State Senate
- Stephanie Thacker, judge of United States Court of Appeals for the Fourth Circuit
- Robert H. Whaley, senior judge of the United States District Court for the Eastern District of Washington
- Stephen T. Williams, mayor of Huntington
- Mike Woelfel, West Virginia Senate

== Military ==
- Don Chafin, sheriff of Logan County, commander in Battle of Blair Mountain
- Justice M. Chambers, Medal of Honor recipient
- Delos Carleton Emmons, lieutenant general, U.S. Army Air Force
- Robert E. Femoyer, Medal of Honor recipient
- Albert G. Jenkins, Confederate brigadier general
- Carwood Lipton, World War II military officer, prominently featured in book and TV series Band of Brothers
- Walter C. Wetzel, United States Army soldier, Medal of Honor recipient
- Louis L. Wilson Jr., former four-star general in the United States Air Force, former commander in chief of the Pacific Air Forces

== Science ==
- Arthur G. Elvin, inventor of several railway devices, such as the Elvin automatic stoker and the Elvin grate-shaker; a key figure in the development of several pneumatic freight devices, such as those used for conveyors and elevators
- Ellen Aline Fenner, botanist and mycologist known for first describing the genus Mycotypha
- Bill Neal, pediatric cardiologist at the West Virginia University
- Edwina Sheppard Pepper, established the John A. Sheppard Ecological Reservation near Marrowbone Creek in Mingo County, West Virginia, which included a homesteading community meant to protect natural resources and the mountain culture; led and participated in groups formed to make electricity and phone service available to the mountain community
- J. Evan Sadler, former hematologist
- Morris Tanenbaum, physical chemist and executive who worked at Bell Laboratories and AT&T Corporation

== Other ==
- Eugene Blake, serial killer
- Ben Bowen, child whose family raised funds for cancer research after his death from cancer
- Delos W. Emmons, co-founder of Huntington, West Virginia
- David Ginsburg, founder of Americans for Democratic Action, former executive director of Kerner Commission
- Eloise Hughes Smith, survivor of RMS Titanic
- William E. Swing, retired bishop of the Episcopal Church in the United States

== See also ==
- List of faculty and alumni of Marshall University
- List of presidents and principals of Marshall University
