= 2024 West Virginia Senate election =

2024 West Virginia Senate elections
- November 5, 2024

17 of 34 seats in the West Virginia Senate 18 seats needed for a majority
	Majority party	Minority party
	GOP	DEM
Leader	Craig Blair (lost renomination)	Mike Woelfel
Party	Republican	Democratic
Leader since	January 13, 2021	January 11, 2023
Leader's seat	15th district	5th district
Last election	30 seats, 67.0%	4 seats, 28.6%
Seats before	31	3
Seats after	32	2
Seat change	▲1	▼1
Popular vote	534,558	134,343
Percentage	79.04%	19.86%
Seats up	15	2
Races won	16	1
- Republican gain Republican hold Democratic hold 50–60% 60–70% 70–80% 80–90% >90% 50–60%
Senate President before election
Craig Blair
Republican
Elected Senate President
Randy Smith
Republican

The 2024 West Virginia Senate election was held on November 5, 2024, with 17 of the chamber's 34 seats up for election. This took place alongside elections to the House of Delegates, as well as a number of statewide elected positions and elections to Congress and the Presidency. Primary elections were held on May 14, 2024.

Summary of the 2024 West Virginia Senate election results
Party	Seats contested	Votes	%	Seats				
Party	Seats contested	Votes	%	Before 86th Leg.	Up	Won	After 87th Leg.	+/–
Republican	17	534,558	79.01%	31	15	12	32	▲1
Democratic	9	134,343	19.86%	3	2	1	2	▼1
Mountain	1	5,594	0.83%	0	0	0	0	Steady
Independents	2	1,785	0.26%	0	0	0	0	Steady
Total		676,280	100.0%	34	17		34	Steady

Popular vote
Republican	79.01%
Democratic	19.86%
Mountain	0.83%
Independents	0.26%

Seats won
Republican	94.22%
Democratic	5.88%

Total senate seats
Republican	94.22%
Democratic	5.88%

== Partisan Background ==
In the 2020 Presidential Election, Republican Donald Trump won all 17 West Virginia State Senate districts. There are two districts Trump won in 2020 which Democrats represented going into the 2024 West Virginia Senate Election: District 5, including parts of Cabell and Wayne Counties (Trump +21%); and District 13, including part of Monongalia County ( Trump + 3%).

Trump 50–60% 60–70% 70–80%

== Retirements ==
=== Democrats ===
1. District 5: Robert Plymale is retiring.
2. District 13: Mike Caputo is retiring.

=== Republicans ===
1. District 9: David Stover is retiring.

== Incumbents defeated ==
=== In primary election ===
Four incumbent senators, all Republicans, were defeated in the May 14 primary election.

==== Republicans ====
1. District 2: Mike Maroney lost renomination to Chris Rose.
2. District 6: Chandler Swope lost renomination to Craig A. Hart.
3. District 11: Robert L. Karnes lost renomination to Robbie Morris.
4. District 15: Craig Blair lost renomination to Tom Willis.

== Seats for election ==
District	Incumbent			Elected Senator		Outcome
District	Member	Party	First elected	Member	Party	Outcome
District 1	Ryan Weld	Republican	2016	Ryan Weld	Republican	Republican hold
District 2	Mike Maroney	Republican	2016	Chris Rose	Republican	Republican hold
District 3	Donna Boley	Republican	1985 (appointed)	Donna Boley	Republican	Republican hold
District 4	Amy Grady	Republican	2020	Amy Grady	Republican	Republican hold
District 5	Robert Plymale	Democratic	1992	Scott Fuller	Republican	Republican gain
District 6	Chandler Swope	Republican	2016	Craig Hart	Republican	Republican hold
District 7	Rupie Phillips	Republican	2020	Rupie Phillips	Republican	Republican hold
District 8	Glenn Jeffries	Republican	2016	Glenn Jeffries	Republican	Republican hold
District 9	David Stover	Republican	2020	Brian Helton	Republican	Republican hold
District 10	Jack Woodrum	Republican	2020	Jack Woodrum	Republican	Republican hold
District 11	Robert Karnes	Republican	2020	Robbie Morris	Republican	Republican hold
District 12	Patrick Martin	Republican	2020	Patrick Martin	Republican	Republican hold
District 13	Mike Caputo	Democratic	2020	Joey Garcia	Democratic	Democratic hold
District 14	Randy Smith	Republican	2016	Randy Smith	Republican	Republican hold
District 15	Craig Blair	Republican	2012	Tom Willis	Republican	Republican hold
District 16	Patricia Rucker	Republican	2016	Patricia Rucker	Republican	Republican hold
District 17	Eric Nelson	Republican	2020	Eric Nelson	Republican	Republican hold

== Predictions ==
Source	Ranking	As of
CNalysis	Solid R	May 14, 2024

=== Competitive races ===
This table lists any legislative seat not rated as Solid D or Solid R by at least one election prediction agency.

Seat	CNalysis Oct. 15
District 5	Toss-up
District 13	Lean D
District 16	Very Likely R

== Close races ==
District	Winner	Margin
District 13	Democratic	8.88%
District 5	Republican (flip)	2.18%

== List of districts ==
=== District 1 ===
Incumbent Ryan Weld was first elected in 2016.

Republican primary results
Party	Candidate	Votes	%
Republican	Ryan Weld (incumbent)	8,342	64.9
Republican	Scott Adams	4,513	35.1
Total votes		12,855	100.0

==== General election ====
West Virginia's 1st Senate district, 2024
Party	Candidate	Votes	%
Republican	Ryan Weld (incumbent)	37,739	100.00%
Total votes		37,739	100.00%

=== District 2 ===
Incumbent Mike Maroney was first elected in 2016. He lost renomination to challenger Chris Rose.

Republican primary results
Party	Candidate	Votes	%
Republican	Chris Rose	7,653	61.3
Republican	Mike Maroney (incumbent)	4,824	38.7
Total votes		12,477	100.0

==== General election ====
West Virginia's 2nd Senate district, 2024
Party	Candidate	Votes	%
Republican	Chris Rose	37,022	100.00%
Total votes		37,022	100.00%

=== District 3 ===
Incumbent Donna Boley was first appointed in 1985.

Republican primary results
Party	Candidate	Votes	%
Republican	Donna Boley (incumbent)	12,325	100.0
Total votes		12,325	100.0

==== General election ====
West Virginia's 3rd Senate district, 2024
Party	Candidate	Votes	%
Republican	Donna Boley (incumbent)	37,987	100.00%
Total votes		37,987	100.00%

=== District 4 ===
Incumbent Amy Grady was first elected in 2020.

Republican primary results
Party	Candidate	Votes	%
Republican	Amy Grady (incumbent)	12,955	100.0
Total votes		12,955	100.0

Democratic primary results
Party	Candidate	Votes	%
Democratic	Dwayne Russell	4,217	100.0
Total votes		4,217	100.0

==== General election ====
===== Predictions =====
Source	Ranking	As of
CNalysis	Solid R	August 5, 2024

===== Results =====
West Virginia's 4th Senate district, 2024
Party	Candidate	Votes	%
Republican	Amy Grady (incumbent)	33,655	74.79%
Democratic	Dwayne Russell	11,343	25.21%
Total votes		44,998	100.00%

=== District 5 ===
Incumbent Robert Plymale was first elected in 1992. He did not file for re-election.

Republican primary results
Party	Candidate	Votes	%
Republican	Scott Fuller	3,753	38.8
Republican	Josh Mathis	3,515	36.4
Republican	Dallas K. Thacker	2,401	24.8
Total votes		9,669	100.0

Democratic primary results
Party	Candidate	Votes	%
Democratic	Ric Griffith	6,828	100.0
Total votes		6,828	100.0

==== General election ====
===== Predictions =====
Source	Ranking	As of
CNalysis	Tossup	August 5, 2024

===== Results =====
West Virginia's 5th Senate district, 2024
Party	Candidate	Votes	%
Republican	Scott Fuller	19,951	51.09%
Democratic	Ric Griffith	19,098	48.91%
Total votes		39,049	100.00%
Republican gain from Democratic			

=== District 6 ===
Incumbent Chandler Swope was first elected in 2016. He lost renomination to challenger Craig Hart.

Republican primary results
Party	Candidate	Votes	%
Republican	Craig A. Hart	4,847	40.9
Republican	Chandler Swope (incumbent)	4,384	36.9
Republican	Eric Porterfield	2,633	22.2
Total votes		11,864	100.0

Democratic primary results
Party	Candidate	Votes	%
Democratic	Randy Fowler	3,748	100.0
Total votes		3,748	100.0

==== General election ====
===== Predictions =====
Source	Ranking	As of
CNalysis	Solid R	August 5, 2024

===== Results =====
West Virginia's 6th Senate district, 2024
Party	Candidate	Votes	%
Republican	Craig A. Hart	23,014	61.04%
Democratic	Jeff DiSibbio	12,924	34.28%
Independent	Dave Sartin	1,765	4.68%
Total votes		37,703	100.00%

=== District 7 ===
Republican primary results
Party	Candidate	Votes	%
Republican	Rupie Phillips (incumbent)	7,860	100.0
Total votes		7,860	100.0

==== General election ====
West Virginia's 7th Senate district, 2024
Party	Candidate	Votes	%
Republican	Rupie Phillips (incumbent)	28,849	100.00%
Total votes		28,849	100.00%

=== District 8 ===
Republican primary results
Party	Candidate	Votes	%
Republican	Glenn Jeffries (incumbent)	8,976	100.0
Total votes		8,976	100.0

==== General election ====
West Virginia's 8th Senate district, 2024
Party	Candidate	Votes	%
Republican	Glenn Jeffries (incumbent)	30,980	100.00%
Total votes		30,980	100.00%

=== District 9 ===
Incumbent David Stover was first elected in 2020. He is retiring.

Republican primary results
Party	Candidate	Votes	%
Republican	Brian Helton	11,061	100.0
Total votes		11,061	100.0

Democratic primary results
Party	Candidate	Votes	%
Democratic	Christy Cardwell	4,510	100.0
Total votes		4,510	100.0

==== General election ====
===== Predictions =====
Source	Ranking	As of
CNalysis	Solid R	August 5, 2024

===== Results =====
West Virginia's 9th Senate district, 2024
Party	Candidate	Votes	%
Republican	Brian Helton	30,734	75.01%
Democratic	Christy Cardwell	10,240	24.99%
Total votes		40,974	100.00%

=== District 10 ===
Incumbent Jack Woodrum was first elected in 2020.

Republican primary results
Party	Candidate	Votes	%
Republican	Jack Woodrum (incumbent)	12,413	100.0
Total votes		12,413	100.0

==== General election ====
West Virginia's 10th Senate district, 2024
Party	Candidate	Votes	%
Republican	Jack Woodrum (incumbent)	37,651	99.95%
Write-in		20	0.05%
Total votes		37,671	100.00%

=== District 11 ===
Incumbent Robert Karnes was first elected in 2020. He lost renomination to challenger Robbie Morris.

Republican primary results
Party	Candidate	Votes	%
Republican	Robbie Morris	9,199	65.9
Republican	Robert Karnes (incumbent)	4,765	34.1
Total votes		13,964	100.0

Democratic primary results
Party	Candidate	Votes	%
Democratic	Mandy Smith Weirich	5,093	100.0
Total votes		5,093	100.0

==== General election ====
===== Predictions =====
Source	Ranking	As of
CNalysis	Solid R	May 20, 2024

===== Results =====
West Virginia's 11th Senate district, 2024
Party	Candidate	Votes	%
Republican	Robbie Morris	31,279	75.93%
Democratic	Mandy Smith Weirich	9,913	24.07%
Total votes		41,192	100.00%

=== District 12 ===
Incumbent Patrick Martin was first elected in 2020.

Republican primary results
Party	Candidate	Votes	%
Republican	Patrick Martin (incumbent)	11,744	100.0
Total votes		11,744	100.0

==== General election ====
West Virginia's 12th Senate district, 2024
Party	Candidate	Votes	%
Republican	Patrick Martin (incumbent)	37,167	100.00%
Total votes		37,167	100.00%

=== District 13 ===
Incumbent Mike Caputo was first elected in 2020. Caputo is retiring.

Republican primary results
Party	Candidate	Votes	%
Republican	Jonathan Board	6,918	100.0
Total votes		6,918	100.0

Democratic primary results
Party	Candidate	Votes	%
Democratic	Joey Garcia	7,570	100.0
Total votes		7,570	100.0

==== General election ====
===== Predictions =====
Source	Ranking	As of
CNalysis	Tossup	August 5, 2024

===== Results =====
West Virginia's 13th Senate district, 2024
Party	Candidate	Votes	%
Democratic	Joey Garcia	21,890	54.44%
Republican	Rebecca Polis	18,321	45.56%
Total votes		40,211	100.00%
Democratic hold			

=== District 14 ===
Incumbent Randy Smith was first elected in 2016.

Republican primary results
Party	Candidate	Votes	%
Republican	Randy Smith (incumbent)	13,897	100.0
Total votes		13,897	100.0

Mountain Party primary results
Party	Candidate	Votes	%
Mountain	Betsy Orndoff-Sayers	19	100.0
Total votes		19	100.0

==== General election ====
===== Predictions =====
Source	Ranking	As of
CNalysis	Solid R	August 5, 2024

===== Results =====
West Virginia's 14th Senate district, 2024
Party	Candidate	Votes	%
Republican	Randy Smith (incumbent)	36,296	86.65%
Mountain	Betsy Orndoff-Sayers	5,594	13.35%
Total votes		41,890	100.0

=== District 15 ===
Incumbent Craig Blair was first elected in 2012. He lost renomination to challenger Tom Willis.

Republican primary results
Party	Candidate	Votes	%
Republican	Tom Willis	5,475	44.4
Republican	Craig Blair (incumbent)	3,973	32.2
Republican	Michael Folk	2,885	23.4
Total votes		12,333	100.0

Democratic primary results
Party	Candidate	Votes	%
Democratic	Anthony Murray	2,846	100.0
Total votes		2,846	100.0

==== General election ====
===== Predictions =====
Source	Ranking	As of
CNalysis	Solid R	August 5, 2024

===== Results =====
West Virginia's 15th Senate district, 2024
Party	Candidate	Votes	%
Republican	Tom Willis	35,979	72.98%
Democratic	Anthony Murray	13,318	27.02%
Total votes		49,297	100.00%

=== District 16 ===
Incumbent Patricia Rucker was first elected in 2016.

Republican primary results
Party	Candidate	Votes	%
Republican	Patricia Rucker (incumbent)	5,193	51.1
Republican	Paul Espinosa	4,963	48.9
Total votes		10,156	100.0

Democratic primary results
Party	Candidate	Votes	%
Democratic	John Doyle	4,431	100.0
Total votes		4,431	100.0

==== General election ====
===== Predictions =====
Source	Ranking	As of
CNalysis	Very Likely R	August 5, 2024

===== Results =====
West Virginia's 16th Senate district, 2024
Party	Candidate	Votes	%
Republican	Patricia Rucker (incumbent)	31,003	60.03%
Democratic	John Doyle	20,645	39.97%
Total votes		51,648	100.00%

=== District 17 ===
Incumbent Eric Nelson was first elected in 2020.

Republican primary results
Party	Candidate	Votes	%
Republican	Eric Nelson (incumbent)	6,733	57.7
Republican	Chris Pritt	4,936	42.3
Total votes		11,669	100.0

Democratic primary results
Party	Candidate	Votes	%
Democratic	Bil Lepp	5,770	100.0
Total votes		5,770	100.0

==== General election ====
===== Predictions =====
Source	Ranking	As of
CNalysis	Solid R	August 5, 2024

===== Results =====
West Virginia's 17th Senate district, 2024
Party	Candidate	Votes	%
Republican	Eric Nelson (incumbent)	26,931	64.27%
Democratic	Bil Lepp	14,972	35.73%
Total votes		41,903	100.00%

== See also ==
- List of West Virginia state legislatures
