= DuRon Jackson =

American politician

Member of the West Virginia Senate from the 5th district
- Incumbent
- Assumed office December 1, 2026 Serving with Scott Fuller
- Preceded by: Mike Woelfel

Personal details
- Born: Huntington, West Virginia, U.S.
- Party: Democratic

DuRon Jackson is an American politician serving as a Democratic member of the West Virginia Senate for the 5th district.

== Early life and education ==
Jackson was born in Huntington, West Virginia and graduated from Huntington High School.

== Career ==
Jackson began his career in the maintenance division of Tri-State Airport, maintaining runways and facilities.

In 2003, he began volunteering at the Huntington YMCA, coaching his children's basketball teams. After ten years as a volunteer coach, he was hired by the YMCA, where he developed programs, established instructional leagues. He later became director of community engagement.

=== Politics ===
In 2020, Jackson was elected to the Huntington City Council as an at-large member, the first Black person elected to an at-large seat on the council.

In 2026, Jackson defeated Chris Miller and now serves the serving as a Democratic member of the West Virginia Senate for the 5th district, claiming Mike Woelfel's previous spot after stating that he wouldn't run again.
