= Evan Jenkins (politician) =

American judge and politician (born 1960)

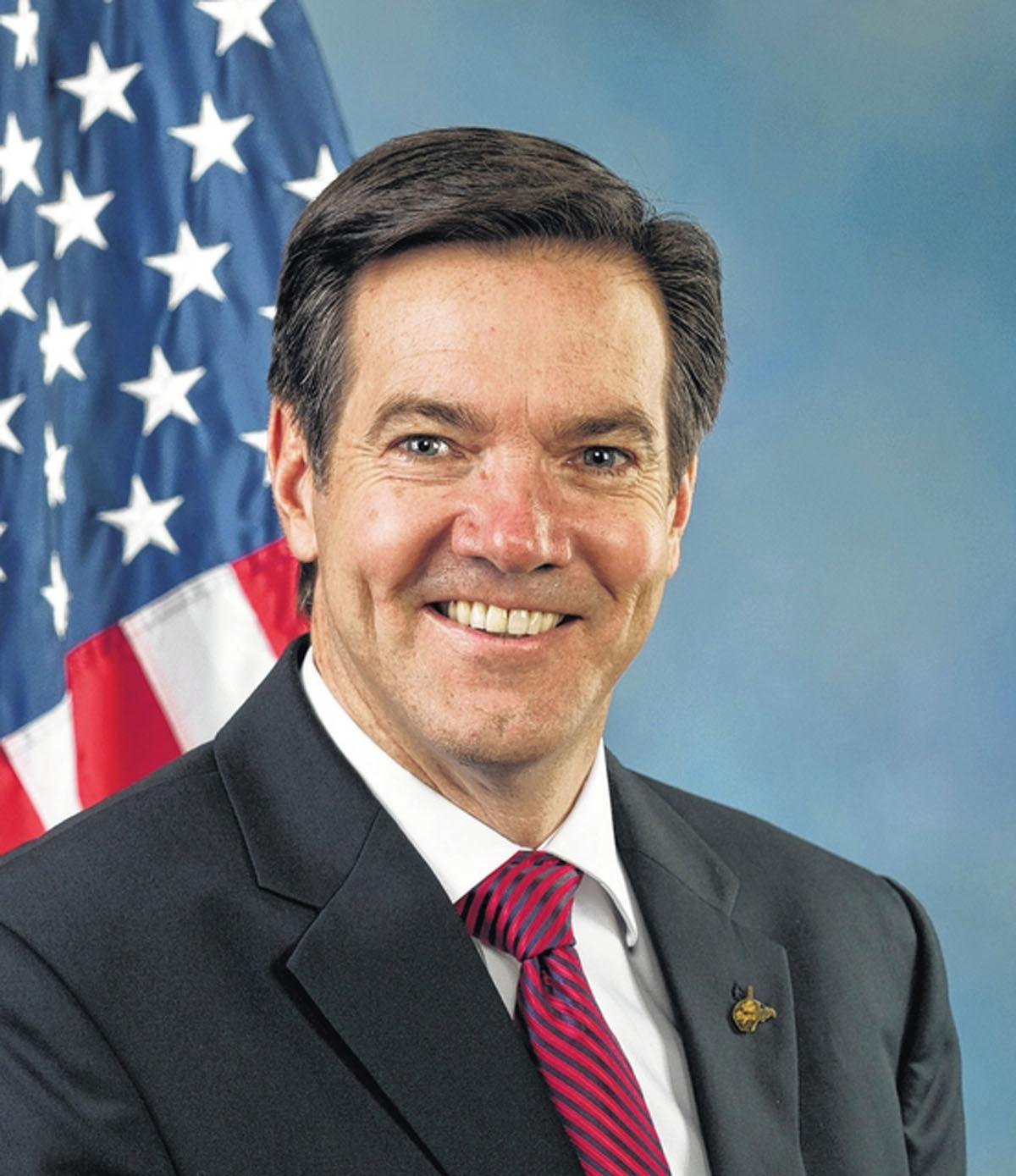
- Official Portrait, 2015

Chief Justice of the West Virginia Supreme Court of Appeals
- In office January 1, 2021 – December 31, 2021
- Preceded by: Tim Armstead
- Succeeded by: John A. Hutchison

Justice of the West Virginia Supreme Court of Appeals
- In office October 1, 2018 – February 4, 2022
- Appointed by: Jim Justice
- Preceded by: Robin Davis
- Succeeded by: C. Haley Bunn

Member of the U.S. House of Representatives from West Virginia's 3rd district
- In office January 3, 2015 – September 30, 2018
- Preceded by: Nick Rahall
- Succeeded by: Carol Miller

Member of the West Virginia Senate from the 5th district
- In office December 1, 2002 – December 1, 2014 Serving with Robert H. Plymale
- Preceded by: Marie Redd
- Succeeded by: Mike Woelfel

Member of the West Virginia House of Delegates from the 16th district
- In office December 1, 1994 – December 1, 2000 Serving with Jody Smirl, Susan Hubbard
- Preceded by: Stephen T. Williams
- Succeeded by: Dale Stephens

Personal details
- Born: Evan Hollin Jenkins; September 12, 1960 (age 65) Huntington, West Virginia, U.S.
- Party: Democratic (before 2013); Republican (2013–present)
- Spouse: Elizabeth Weiler
- Children: 3
- Education: University of Florida (BS); Samford University (JD)

Evan Hollin Jenkins (born September 12, 1960) is an American politician and judge. He served as a justice of the Supreme Court of Appeals of West Virginia, joining the Court in 2018 and serving as chief justice in 2021. He resigned from the court on February 4, 2022. He served as a U.S. Representative from West Virginia from 2015 to 2018. He is a Republican, having switched his party affiliation from Democratic in 2013.

Jenkins was a member of the West Virginia Senate from the 5th district, which contains Cabell County and a small portion of Wayne County. He served in both chambers of the West Virginia Legislature in Charleston over the course of 20 years, having been elected as a member of the House in 1994, and elected to the Senate in 2002. He gave up his seat to run in the 2014 congressional election, defeating incumbent Democrat Nick Rahall.

Jenkins was a candidate for the U.S. Senate in 2018, losing to West Virginia Attorney General Patrick Morrisey in the primary election.

== Early life and education ==
Jenkins, a lifelong resident of Huntington, is the son of Dorothy C. Jenkins and the late John E. Jenkins Jr. He attended public schools.

Jenkins earned his B.S. in education and business administration from the University of Florida in 1983. He went on to earn his Juris Doctor from Samford University Cumberland School of Law in 1987.

== Early career ==
He was the executive director of the West Virginia State Medical Association, and taught business law as an instructor at Marshall University. He is also the former co-chairman of the Health Care Committee in the West Virginia State Chamber of Commerce. He formerly served as general counsel of the West Virginia State Chamber of Commerce.

=== West Virginia Legislature ===
Jenkins served in both houses of the legislature in Charleston as a member of the Democratic Party, having first been elected as a member of the West Virginia House of Delegates in 1994. He lost a race for the Supreme Court of Appeals of West Virginia in 2000.

Jenkins was then elected to the West Virginia State Senate in 2002, after defeating Democratic incumbent Marie Redd in the primary election and former State Senator Thomas Scott in the general election. In 2006, Jenkins once again defeated Redd in the primary election, and Scott in the general election (with 64% of the vote). In 2010, Jenkins was again re-elected to the West Virginia State Senate, District 5, running unopposed in the general election.

== U.S. House of Representatives ==
=== Elections ===
==== 2014 ====
In July 2013, Jenkins announced he was switching to the Republican Party in preparation for a run at West Virginia's 3rd congressional district seat, held by 19-term Democrat Nick Rahall. On switching parties, Jenkins stated that: "West Virginia is under attack from Barack Obama and a Democratic Party that our parents and grandparents would not recognize." West Virginia's 3rd district had long been a Democratic stronghold on the congressional level, but had been swept up in the growing Republican tide that had consumed the state since the turn of the century. In 2012, it went for Mitt Romney 66-32 percent, making it the second-most Republican district in the nation to be represented by a Democrat. Jenkins and Rahall had contributed to each other's campaigns in the decade's previous election cycles.

Jenkins ran unopposed in the Republican primary. He faced Rahall in the general election in November 2014. An early poll showed Jenkins with a double-digit lead over Rahall.

The National Right to Life Committee, West Virginia Chamber of Commerce, and West Virginians for Life, all of which had previously supported Rahall, supported Jenkins in 2014, and the West Virginia Coal Association endorsed Jenkins in September 2014. On October 2, managing editor Kyle Kondik of Sabato's Crystal Ball said the race was a toss-up, calling it "Super close, super expensive and super nasty." Rahall outspent Jenkins in the election by a two-to-one ratio.

In the general election, Jenkins defeated Rahall, taking 55% of the vote to 45% — the second-largest margin of defeat for a House incumbent in the 2014 cycle. As a measure of how Democratic much of this district once was, when Jenkins took office on January 3, 2015, he became the first Republican to represent what is now the 3rd since 1957 (the district was numbered as the 4th before 1993), and the first Republican to represent most of the district's southern portion since 1933 (most of which was the 5th district before it was eliminated in 1973). In addition, Jenkins's victory, along with those of Alex Mooney and David McKinley, meant that West Virginia had an all-Republican House delegation for the first time since 1923.

==== 2016 ====
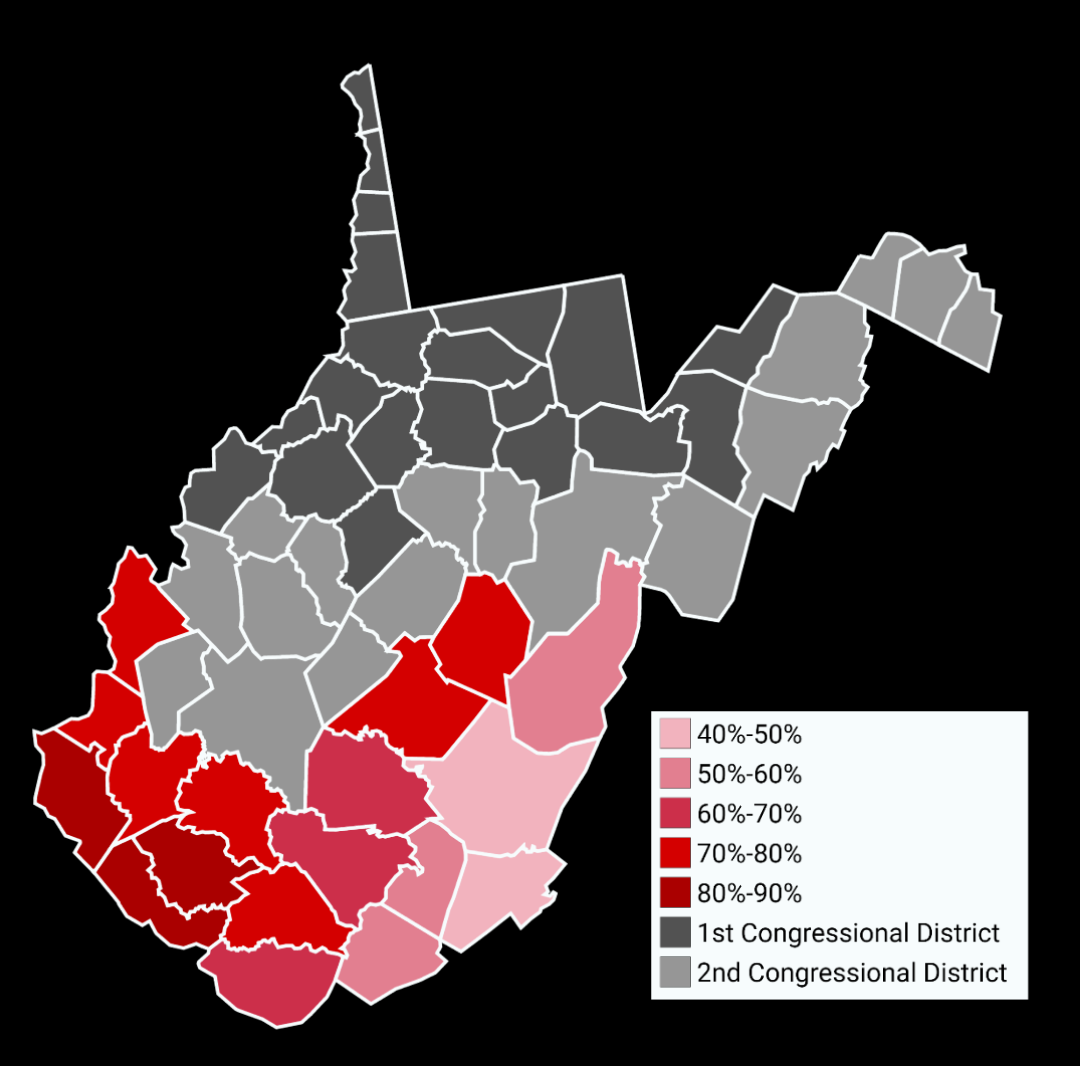
Map showing the results of the 2016 election in West Virginia's third congressional district by county

Jenkins defeated Democratic candidate Matt Detch in the November 2016 general election with 67.9% of the vote.

=== Tenure ===
Jenkins was a member of the Republican Main Street Partnership.

=== Committee assignments ===
- Committee on Appropriations
  - Subcommittee on Commerce, Justice, Science, and Related Agencies
  - Subcommittee on Interior, Environment, and Related Agencies
  - Subcommittee on the Legislative Branch

=== Caucus memberships ===
- Congressional Arts Caucus
- United States Congressional International Conservation Caucus

== 2018 U.S. Senate election ==
On May 8, 2017, Jenkins announced his intention to run for the United States Senate seat held by Joe Manchin. His main competitor for the Republican nomination was state Attorney General Patrick Morrisey. On May 8, 2018, exactly one year after announcing his bid for the Republican nomination, Jenkins lost the primary, coming in second place to Morrisey.

== Political positions ==
=== Deferred Action for Childhood Arrivals (DACA) ===
On September 5, 2017, President Trump formally rescinded the Deferred Action for Childhood Arrivals (DACA) program. DACA allows certain undocumented immigrants who entered the United States as children to receive a renewable two-year period of deferred action from deportation and eligibility for a work permit. Jenkins supported Trump's decision. Jenkins said, “President Obama overstepped his constitutional authority by creating the DACA program through an executive order. We are a nation of laws and have a responsibility to secure our borders."

=== Environment ===
Jenkins feels that some Environmental Protection Agency regulations are too strict, such as those affecting the coal industry and the use of wood-burning stoves. He supported President Donald Trump's decision to withdraw from the Paris Agreement, saying: "The Paris accord puts the United States on an uneven playing field, forcing us to make costly reductions, all while countries like China and India make their own rules."

=== Health care ===
In May 2017, Jenkins voted for the American Health Care Act (AHCA), the Republican bill to repeal and replace the Affordable Care Act (Obamacare), saying that he supported "coverage for pre-existing conditions, mental health care and substance abuse treatment... Under this legislation, West Virginia would have a choice about what will work best for us." Later in June 2017, Jenkins said that while AHCA allowed states to opt out of the requirement that insurers not discriminate against individuals with preexisting conditions and the requirement that insurers provide "essential health benefits", he did not want West Virginia to seek waivers from those requirements. Asked about the nonpartisan Congressional Budget Office's estimate that 23 million Americans would lose their insurance under AHCA, Jenkins questioned the accuracy of the CBO's prediction and said that the numbers failed to account for people who will get insurance due to economic growth.

=== Opioid crisis ===
In August 2017, Jenkins discussed the issue of the opioid crisis with President Trump on Air Force One on the ride back to Washington after Trump spoke at the National Boy Scout Jamboree. As a member of the House Appropriations Committee, Jenkins said the issue is important to him. He worked to help get hundreds of millions of dollars for treatment, law enforcement and drug courts. Jenkins said, "In addition, I helped authorize the full $1.6 billion President Trump requested for the southern border wall, which will help stop the flow of black tar heroin into the United States."

== West Virginia Supreme Court of Appeals ==
On September 30, 2018, Jenkins resigned from Congress after having been appointed as a justice of the Supreme Court of Appeals of West Virginia by West Virginia Governor Jim Justice. Jenkins was then elected on November 6, 2018, to fill a remaining six-year term as a justice of the Supreme Court of Appeals of West Virginia due to the resignation of Robin Davis. On November 20, 2020, Jenkins was designated to be Chief Justice effective January 1, 2021. He resigned from the court on February 4, 2022.

Supreme Court of Appeals, Unexpired Term Division II 2018 Election results
Party	Candidate	Votes	%
Nonpartisan	Evan Jenkins (incumbent)	182,133	36.01%
Nonpartisan	Dennise Renee Smith	70,394	13.92%
Nonpartisan	Jeff Kessler	60,077	11.88%
Nonpartisan	Jim Douglas	47,609	9.41%
Nonpartisan	Robert J. Frank	29,751	5.88%
Nonpartisan	William Stewart Thompson	29,613	5.86%
Nonpartisan	Jim O'Brien	28,766	5.69%
Nonpartisan	Brenden D. Long	20,443	4.04%
Nonpartisan	Marty 'Redshoes' Sheehan	18,639	3.69%
Nonpartisan	William Schwartz	18,291	3.62%
Total votes		505,716	100.0%

== Personal life ==
Jenkins and his wife Elizabeth have three children, two sons and one daughter.

== See also ==
- List of American politicians who switched parties in office

U.S. House of Representatives
Preceded by Nick Rahall	Member of the U.S. House of Representatives from West Virginia's 3rd congressional district 2015–2018	Succeeded by Carol Miller
Legal offices
Preceded by Robin Davis	Justice of the West Virginia Supreme Court of Appeals; 2018–2022	Succeeded by C. Haley Bunn
Preceded by Tim Armstead	Chief Justice of the West Virginia Supreme Court of Appeals; 2021	Succeeded by John A. Hutchison
U.S. order of precedence (ceremonial)
Preceded by Cleve Benedict as Former U.S. Representative	Order of precedence of the United States as Former U.S. Representative	Succeeded by Cresent Hardy as Former U.S. Representative
