= Tank services =

The tank services industry exists to assist companies in maintaining storage and fuel tanks. Regular maintenance, as well as other services, are required for many types of above ground storage tank systems used in the energy and petro-chemical industry. Some of the areas that tank service companies provide assistance with include the tank inspection, engineering and design, tank lifting and remediation, and tank relocation.

== Operations ==
=== Testing ===
In the United Kingdom, companies that specialise in tank services, oil tank removals, replacement and installations are required to follow detailed rules and regulations. The Domestic Oil Burner Equipment Testing Association (DOBETA) was established in the early 1970s. This association was succeeded by the Oil Firing Technical Association, which was launched as OFTEC in 1991. OFTEC maintains a comprehensive set of guidelines and regulations on fuel tank installations. Tank servicing companies are required to follow a combination of both Building Regulations and OFTEC Guidelines to provide a fully compliant safe installation service. OFTEC recommends that oil-firing equipment is serviced annually and that tanks should be checked visually at the same time.

=== Inspection, engineering and design ===
At the start of any project, an API certified above ground storage tank inspector should be on hand to provide inspection and consultation services, and to ensure compliance with applicable codes and standards in the region. Each tank upgrading project has specific requirements and presents unique challenges. Proper procedure will ensure project safety, tank integrity, and the best utilization of resources and materials. A complete engineering analysis should be performed to ensure that tank components will not be overstressed during lifting and remedial operations. A professional engineer will develop project-specific drawings and procedures, and will supervise each stage of the work.

=== Tank lifting and remediation ===
An analysis of the situation will result in recommendations for the appropriate remedial action, and what repair work should be performed, possibly including but not limited to:

- tank lifting
- leveling
- repair and replacement of roofs and floors
- shell repairs
- reconstruction of foundations

Storage tanks should be updated to meet the highest local environmental standards, including the installation of release prevention barriers and leak detection.

Several different technologies exist for lifting tanks. The conventional methods involve hydraulic jacking equipment, while another method utilizes an airbag lifting system to elevate the tank from its base to allow for remedial action.

=== Tank relocation ===
Some companies choose to relocate existing tanks, rather than embark on new tank construction. Tank relocation services can be utilized on land or via navigable waterways. There can be cost benefits to relocating an existing tank, depending on variables such as distance and the condition of the tank.
