= Senator Redd =

Senator Redd may refer to:

- Dana Redd (born 1968), New Jersey State Senate
- Marie Redd (fl. 1990s–2000s), West Virginia State Senate
