= Kenwood (Huntington, West Virginia) =

Historic house in West Virginia, United States

- U.S. National Register of Historic Places
- Location within West Virginia Location within the United States
- Location: 619 Ridgewood Rd., Huntington, West Virginia
- Coordinates: 38°24′10″N 82°26′43″W
- Area: 4.1 acres (1.7 ha)
- Built: c. 1910
- Architect: H. Rus Warne
- Architectural style: Classical Revival
- NRHP reference No.: 07000784
- Added to NRHP: August 2, 2007

Kenwood, also known as the John A. Sheppard House, is a historic home located at Huntington, Cabell County, West Virginia. It was designed by the prominent West Virginia architect, H. Rus Warne, and built about 1910, and is a 2 1/2-story, rectangular, side gable house with flanking one-story, enclosed wings with flat roofs covered in green clay tile. The house measures approximately 100 feet long and 64 feet deep. It features an entrance portico with two story Tuscan order columns. The house is in the Classical Revival style with Greek Revival details. Also on the property is a contributing garage.

It was listed on the National Register of Historic Places in 2007.

== See also ==
- Edwina Sheppard Pepper, grew up and married at Kenwood
- National Register of Historic Places listings in Cabell County, West Virginia
