= Jerome A. Gilbert =

37th President of Marshall University
- In office January 1, 2016 – December 31, 2021
- Preceded by: Stephen J. Kopp
- Succeeded by: Brad D. Smith

Personal details
- Education: Mississippi State University; Duke University

Jerome A. Gilbert is a biomedical engineer and university administrator. He was the president of Marshall University in Huntington, West Virginia.

== Early life and education ==
Gilbert was born in Mississippi and received his bachelor's degree from Mississippi State University. He then received his Ph.D. in biomedical engineering from Duke University.

== Academic appointments ==
Gilbert was previously a graduate assistant at Duke, and later held academic appointments at North Carolina State University and the University of North Carolina Medical School. In 1988 he joined the faculty of Mississippi State, and was made a full professor in 1993. He also held a position at the University of Mississippi Medical Center. In 2010 he became provost of Mississippi State. He was appointed President of Marshall University in 2016 following the sudden death of Stephen J. Kopp. He is a member of the College of Fellows of the American Institute for Medical and Biological Engineering and of the Fellows of the Institute of Biological Engineering.

== See also ==
- List of presidents and principals of Marshall University
