= List of presidents and principals of Marshall University =

President of Marshall University
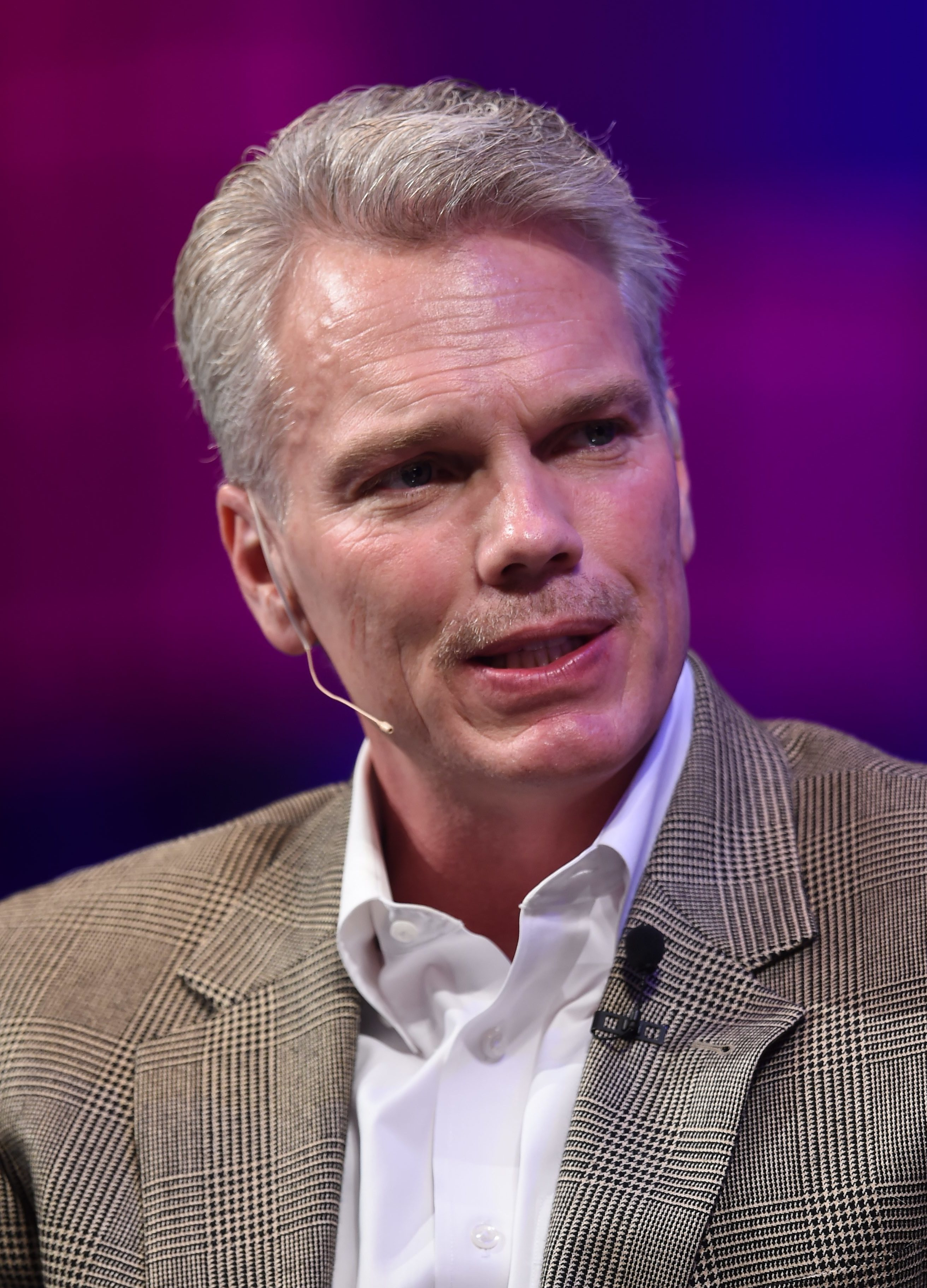
- Incumbent; Brad D. Smith since 2022
- Appointer: Marshall University Board of Governors
- Formation: 1837 (principal); 1896 (president)
- First holder: Issac N. Peck (principal); Lawrence J. Corbley (president)
- Website: Office of the President

This list of presidents and principals of Marshall University includes all who have served as principals or presidents of Marshall University since its founding in 1837. Marshall University is a public research university in Huntington, West Virginia. The university was originally known as Marshall Academy. In 1858, the Virginia General Assembly changed the name to Marshall College, On March 2, 1961, West Virginia Legislature elevated the college to university status, thus becoming Marshall University.

== Principals ==
=== Academy Years (1837–1867) ===
- Isaac N. Peck, 1837–1839
- Jacob H. Patton, 1839–1840
- Alfred E. Thom, 1840–1843
- Josiah B. Poage, 1843–1850
- Henry Clark, 1850
- Joseph Foster, 1850
- William B. McFarland, 1850–1853
- Staunton V. Field, 1853–1854
- William R. Boyers, 1854–1858
- Benjamin H. Thackston, 1858–1861
- Rev. J. M. Brown, 1861
- Daniel W. Thrush, 1861
- Salina C. Hite Mason, 1863–1867

=== College Years (1867–1896) ===
- Samuel R. Thompson, 1868–1871
- John Ball Powell, 1871–1872
- James Elmore Morrow, 1872–1873
- James Beauchamp Clark, 1873–1874
- Alonzo Decatur Chesterman, 1874–1881
- Benjamin Hudson Thackston, 1881–1884
- William Joseph Kenny, Sr., 1884–1886
- Thomas Edward Hodges, 1886–1896

== Presidents ==
=== College Years (1896–1961) ===
- Lawrence Jugurtha Corbley, 1896–1915
- Oscar Israel Woodley, 1915–1919
- Frederic Rutherford Hamilton, 1919–1923
- Morris Purdy Shawkey, 1923–1935
- James Edwards Allen, 1935–1942
- John Davis Williams, 1942–1946
- Stewart Harold Smith, 1946–1961

=== University Years (1961-present) ===
- Stewart Harold Smith, 1961–1968
- Roland Hill Nelson Jr., 1968–1970
- Donald Dedmon, 1970–1971
- John Grove Barker, 1971–1974
- Robert Bruce Hayes, 1974–1983
- Sam Edward Clagg, 1984
- Dale F. Nitzschke, 1984–1990
- Alan Brant Gould, 1990–1991
- J. Wade Gilley, 1991–1999
- Audy Michael Perry, 1999–2000
- Daniel Angel, 2000–2005
- Michael Joseph Ferrell, 2005
- Stephen J. Kopp, 2005–2014
- Gary G. White, 2014 – Jan 2016
- Jerome A. Gilbert, 2016–2021
- Brad D. Smith, 2021 – present

== See also ==
- List of faculty and alumni of Marshall University
- List of people from Huntington, West Virginia
