= Stephen J. Kopp =

36th President of Marshall University

36th President of Marshall University
- In office July 1, 2005 – December 17, 2014
- Preceded by: Daniel Duane Angel
- Succeeded by: Jerome A. Gilbert

Personal details
- Born: March 28, 1951 Panama Canal Zone, Panama
- Died: December 17, 2014 (aged 63) Huntington, West Virginia, U.S.
- Education: University of Notre Dame

Stephen James Kopp (March 28, 1951 – December 17, 2014) was an American educator. He was president of Marshall University in Huntington, West Virginia from 2005 until his death in 2014.

He earned a Bachelor of Science degree in biology from the University of Notre Dame, and his Ph.D. in Physiology and Biophysics from the University of Illinois at Chicago.

He served as a postdoctoral fellow at the St. Louis University Medical Center, and a research fellow and NIH Fellow in the department of biochemistry at the University of Illinois at Chicago prior to joining the faculty of Midwestern University.

Prior to his career at Marshall, Kopp had been serving as a Special Assistant to the Chancellor with the Ohio Board of Regents. Dr. Kopp served as Provost at Ohio University from 2002 to 2004 in Athens, Ohio. He also was founding Dean of the Herbert H. and Grace A. Dow College of Health Professions at Central Michigan University, and founding Dean of the College of Allied Health Professions at Midwestern University. He also served in a variety of positions for nearly 20 years at the Chicago College of Osteopathic Medicine.

Kopp assumed the presidency on July 1, 2005, taking over from interim president Michael J. Farrell. During that time, MU invested more than $300 million in new buildings and building renovations, including the new Visual Arts Center in downtown Huntington, the $55 million Arthur Weisberg Family Applied Engineering Complex, the $48 million Robert C. Byrd Biotechnology Science Center, the $23.5 million Erma Ora Byrd Clinical Center, the $44 million Edwards Comprehensive Cancer Center, the $17 million Chris Cline Athletic Complex indoor practice facility and the $8 million Veterans Memorial Soccer Complex.

He was also a key figure in guiding the Joan C. Edwards School of Medicine out of its LCME probationary period in 2011 to reaccreditation in 2013 along with Dean Joseph I. Shapiro, whom Kopp was very instrumental in recruiting to Marshall in 2012.

Kopp died suddenly on December 17, 2014, of an apparent heart attack.

== See also ==
- List of presidents and principals of Marshall University
