= Brad D. Smith =

American businessman and university president

Brad Smith
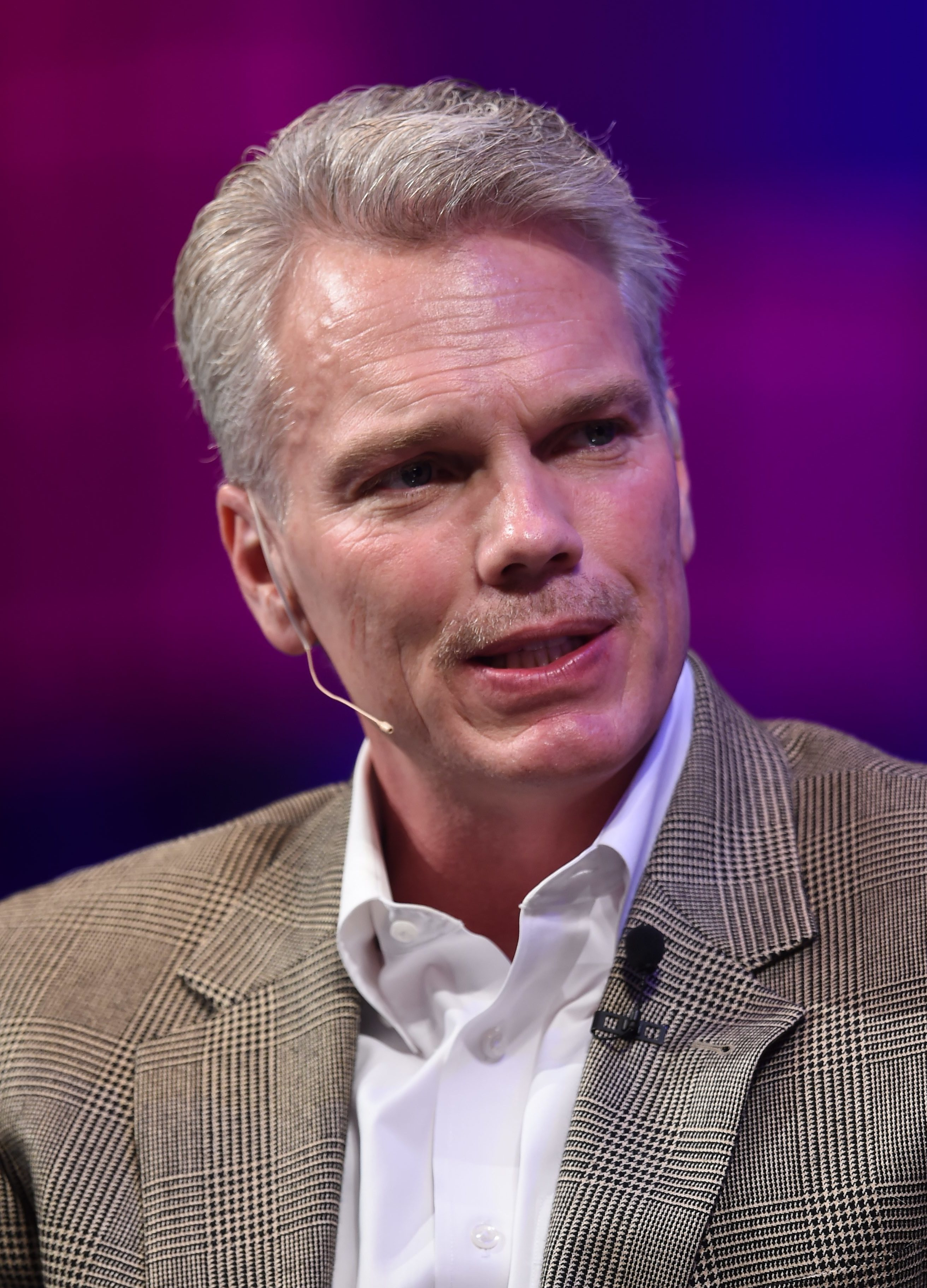
- Smith in 2014

38th President of Marshall University
- Incumbent
- Assumed office January 1, 2022
- Preceded by: Jerome A. Gilbert

Personal details
- Born: April 6, 1964 (age 62) Kenova, West Virginia, U.S.
- Spouse: Alys Smith (m. 1993)
- Children: 2
- Education: United States Military Academy (attended); Marshall University (BBA); Aquinas College (MM)

Brad D. Smith (born April 6, 1964) is an American businessman and university administrator who has been the president of Marshall University since 2022. He was chief executive officer of Intuit from 2008 to 2018. On June 15, 2023, Smith passed Jim Justice and became the richest person in West Virginia.

== Early life and education ==
Smith grew up in Kenova, West Virginia. At the age of 14, Smith participated in Martial Arts. He attended Ceredo-Kenova High School and attended the United States Military Academy at West Point upon graduation for one semester. After West Point, Smith enrolled at Marshall University and received his bachelor's degree in 1986. Smith earned his master's degree in management and leadership development from Aquinas College in 1991.

== Career ==
=== Business ===
Smith began his career with positions at Pepsi Bottling Group and 7Up Co. He was the vice president for Field Marketing at ADVO from 1992 to 1996. Smith was a senior vice president of marketing and business development at ADP from 1996 to 2003 before joining Intuit. Smith joined Intuit in February 2003 and held several positions in the company. He became Intuit's chief executive officer in January 2008, succeeding Steve Bennett.

In August 2018, Smith announced that he would step down as Intuit's CEO at the end of 2018 while staying on as the company's executive board chairman. His position was passed to Sasan Goodarzi.

In 2017, Smith joined the board of directors at SurveyMonkey. Smith joined the board of directors at Nordstrom in 2013.

Smith was on the board of directors for Humana Inc., an American for-profit health insurance company, from September 2022 to April 2025.

In September 2023, Smith joined the Amazon board of directors, as a member of the audit committee.

Smith was elected to the Board of Directors of JPMorgan Chase & Co., an American multinational financial services firm in January 2025.

=== Academic ===
On October 28, 2021, Smith was named president of Marshall University, his alma mater.

== Philanthropy ==
Before Smith took the role as the president of Marshall University he donated millions of dollars to construction for new facilities and buildings.

In 2020, Smith donated $25 million to West Virginia University. The donation supported the creation of the Brad and Alys Smith Outdoor Economic Development Collaborative to develop recreational infrastructure, expand outdoor educational opportunities, and provide initial funding for a relocation package program to support individuals during the COVID-19 pandemic.

=== Buildings named after Brad D. Smith ===
Building	Image	Constructed	Notes	Ref.
Brad D. Smith Center for Business and Innovation		2024	New location for the Lewis College of Business on 4th Ave in Huntington, WV	
Brad D. Smith Foundation Hall		2010	It houses the Erickson Alumni Center on the first floor. It is named for donors Brad D. Smith and Charlie O. Erickson respectively.	

== Personal life ==
Smith is married to Alys Smith, an attorney, with whom he has two daughters.

== See also ==
- List of presidents and principals of Marshall University
