= Edwina Sheppard Pepper =

Socialite becomes environmentalist

- Born: Edwina Neihl Sheppard; April 5, 1893; Grew up in Huntington, West Virginia
- Died: November 11, 1988 (aged 95); South Williamson, Kentucky
- Known for: Conservation of Appalachian Mountains resources
- Spouse: Curtis Gordon Pepper (m. 1916; died 1930)
- Children: 4, including Curtis "Bill" Pepper
- Parent(s): Lydia Goings Sheppard and John Alexander Sheppard

Edwina Sheppard Pepper (April 5, 1893 – November 11, 1988) established the John A. Sheppard Ecological Reservation near Marrowbone Creek in Mingo County, West Virginia, which included a homesteading community. The intention was to protect the natural resources on the land and the mountain culture, which had changed significantly after many locals moved north to work in factories or served in the military during World War II (1941–1945). She led and participated in groups formed to make electricity and phone service available to the mountain community.

People banded together to have a stronger voice for improvements and to address concerns like strip-mining. Ralph Nadar said of her, "As more and more land has been stripped or deep mined the inhabitants of these mountains have lost not only their homes but also their self worth. Mrs Pepper has tried to restore the feeling of community resourcefulness the inhabitants' forefathers knew." Pepper also had a voice as publisher of The Mountain Call.

== Background ==
During World War II, many of the inhabitants of the mountain communities of West Virginia went north to work in factories to produce goods for the war. Others served in the military, many of whom died during the war. Many businesses, like stores and mills, closed down, leaving the coal industry the major employer in the mountains. The local economy continued to depress into the 1950s, as many people decided to go or remain in the north. The poor economy effected the coal industry as well. Mountain schools closed, which further fueled the migration out of the mountains. From 1958 to 1980, the number of elementary schools in the Mingo County school district in West Virginia reduced from 65 to 19. Children were sent to consolidated schools with bus service, with some living more than two miles from the bus stop.

== Personal life ==
Edwina Neihl Sheppard was born on April 5, 1893 to Lydia Jane Sheppard and John A. Sheppard in 1893. (Note: In public records her name generally does not have a middle name, or just the middle initial "N.", there are some sources that state that the "N" stands for Neihl, Neil, Neal, or Neel.) Edwina's sisters were Wells T. Sager, Jane McKeehan, and Pauline. Edwina's father was an independent oil producer. She grew up in Huntington, West Virginia. The family also lived in Tulsa, Oklahoma. Edwina attended the University of Michigan from 1915 to 1916.

Edwina Sheppard married Curtis Gordon Pepper (1887–1930), a mechanical engineer and oil industry executive from Champaign, Illinois, on May 6, 1916, at her parents' estate (Kenwood) in Huntington, West Virginia. The couple resided in Huntington in 1920 and were the parents of Curtis G.Pepper, Jr. and Jack S. Pepper. The family also lived in New York City and Tulsa, Oklahoma. Curtis Gordon Pepper died in 1930.

Pepper lived in New York City at 130 East 57th Street (a historic building, now Hotel 57) in 1930 and when her eldest son Curtis "Bill" Pepper enlisted in the war. At that time, Curtis worked at Paramount Pictures in Los Angeles.

In 1950, the widowed Edwina S. Pepper lived with her son John and his wife Eleanor, along with her oldest son, Curtis G. Pepper, and his wife, Beverly Pepper in San Diego, California. In the summer of 1945, Pepper began to visit Mingo County, West Virginia, and investing land that she might buy that would be adjacent to the land she inherited from her father. When she moved back to West Virginia, she had two great-nephews and twins, John and Michael Fanning, living with her and attending the local Big Laurel school until it closed down. Pepper other members of the community formed groups to successfully tackle opening up a school that was more convenient and would cater to the needs of the children, establish telephone service and electricity. They raised money to fund the improvements. They ensured that political officials were not performing crimes in conjunction with their positions.

== West Virginia conservancy and ventures ==
In the 1940s, Edwina Pepper purchased land in Mingo County, West Virginia, and established her house, The Knob, near Marrowbone Creek, with the long-term plan to form a land conservancy there. By the 1970s, she had founded The John A. Sheppard Ecological Reservation (JASMER), named for her father. It is a homesteading community, animal sanctuary, and plant conservatory. It sits on 300 acres of poplar, hickory, ash, and locust forested land. A community has developed of people whose families have lived in the area for 200 years and obtained titles to home sites in the reservation. They built log cabins on their land.

The Big Laurel Learning Center operates environmental and educational community programs near Kermit, West Virginia.

In 1976, Pepper founded a school for children, which closed down in 1988 and became the Big Laurel School Learning Center. She operated The Mountain Call magazine, with editorials and articles about mountain life and lore, between 1973 and 1979. When Pepper was 84, her great-nephews, John and Michael Fanning, published the magazine with Greg Carannate. When coal mining companies considered "large-scale strip-mining" the mountain, Pepper and the Fanning brothers explored ways to circumvent the mountain's destruction and maintain Marrowbone Creek's continued health. In The Mountain Call they have called to "Keep Marrowbone Green". A petition was sent to the state to preserve the mountain. Pepper and the Fanning twins reminded the West Virginia Department of Natural Resources of a law to protect against strip miners.

== Death and legacy ==
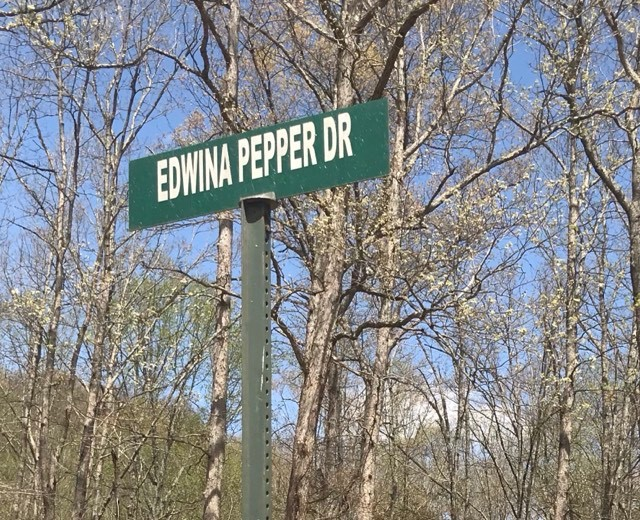
Edwina Pepper Drive sign at the John A Sheppard Ecological Reservation (JASMER)

Ewina Pepper died November 11, 1988, at Appalachian Regional Hospital in South Williamson, Kentucky. Edwina Pepper's grave is near her home, "The Knob", which is now a children's summer camp.

According to the Lexington Herald-Leader obituary for Pepper, consumer advocate Ralph Nader said, "Mrs Pepper an 'unsung heroine'" in 1977. He also said, "As more and more land has been stripped or deep mined the inhabitants of these mountains have lost not only their homes but also their self worth. Mrs Pepper has tried to restore the feeling of community resourcefulness the inhabitants' forefathers knew."

Jim Wayne Miller, author of The Examined Life: Family, Community. Work in American Literature states that Pepper is a model of the type of educator who can be cognizant of global viewpoints while also serving specific needs within one's community, like when she established the land conservancy reservation and the Big Laurel School to prosper in mountain life.
