= Smash Your Baggage =

- Directed by: Roy Mack
- Written by: A. Dorian Otvos
- Starring: Smalls Paradise Entertainers (only credited participants); Carrie Marrier; Lew Payton; Mabel Scott; Elmer Snowden Orchestra
- Cinematography: Edwin B. DuPar
- Music by: Elmer Snowden; Elmer Snowden Orchestra
- Distributed by: Warner Brothers
- Release date: October 29, 1932
- Running time: 9 minutes
- Country: United States
- Language: English

Smash Your Baggage is a 1932 Vitaphone pre-Code short musical comedy film released by Warner Bros., as part of their Vitaphone Varieties series on October 29, 1932. Directed by Roy Mack, the film features African American performers Carrie Marrier, Mabel Scott, the Smalls Paradise Entertainers and Lew Payton who co-wrote and performed in The Chocolate Dandies, a Broadway revue. Variety, in November 1932, described it as "one of those hectic song-and dance melanges".

With a script written by A. Dorian Otvos, the film features Elmer Snowden and his Orchestra who perform the "Bugle Call Rag" and other tunes. The featured musicians (all uncredited) include Roy Eldridge (trumpet), Dicky Wells (trombone), Otto Hardwick (alto saxophone) and Sidney Catlett (drums).

== Plot ==
A group of African American redcaps at a railroad station perform musical numbers to raise donations to support a sick colleague.
