= Marie Redd =

American politician

Member of the West Virginia Senate from the 5th district
- In office December 1, 1998 – December 1, 2002
- Preceded by: Thomas Francis Scott
- Succeeded by: Evan Jenkins

Personal details
- Born: Huntington, West Virginia, U.S.
- Party: Democratic
- Spouse: William L. Redd
- Education: Marshall University (B.A.); Marshall University (M.A.)
- Profession: Social Security Advocate

Marie E. Redd is a United States politician from the state of West Virginia. Redd was a Democratic West Virginia State Senator from the 5th district, which contains Cabell County and a small portion of Wayne County. In 1998, she defeated incumbent Republican Thomas F. Scott in the general election, thereby becoming the first African-American state senator in West Virginia history. Redd lost to Evan Jenkins in the 2002 Democratic primary election and again in 2006.

== Personal ==
Marie Redd is married to attorney William Redd and they have two children. Prior to her election to the West Virginia Senate in 1998, Redd was an associate professor of criminal justice at Marshall University and worked at the IBM Corporation for 18 years. Redd was an unsuccessful candidate for the Cabell County Commission in 2014. She was named a West Virginia Wonder Woman by West Virginia Living Magazine in 2020.
