= Curtis Bill Pepper =

American journalist

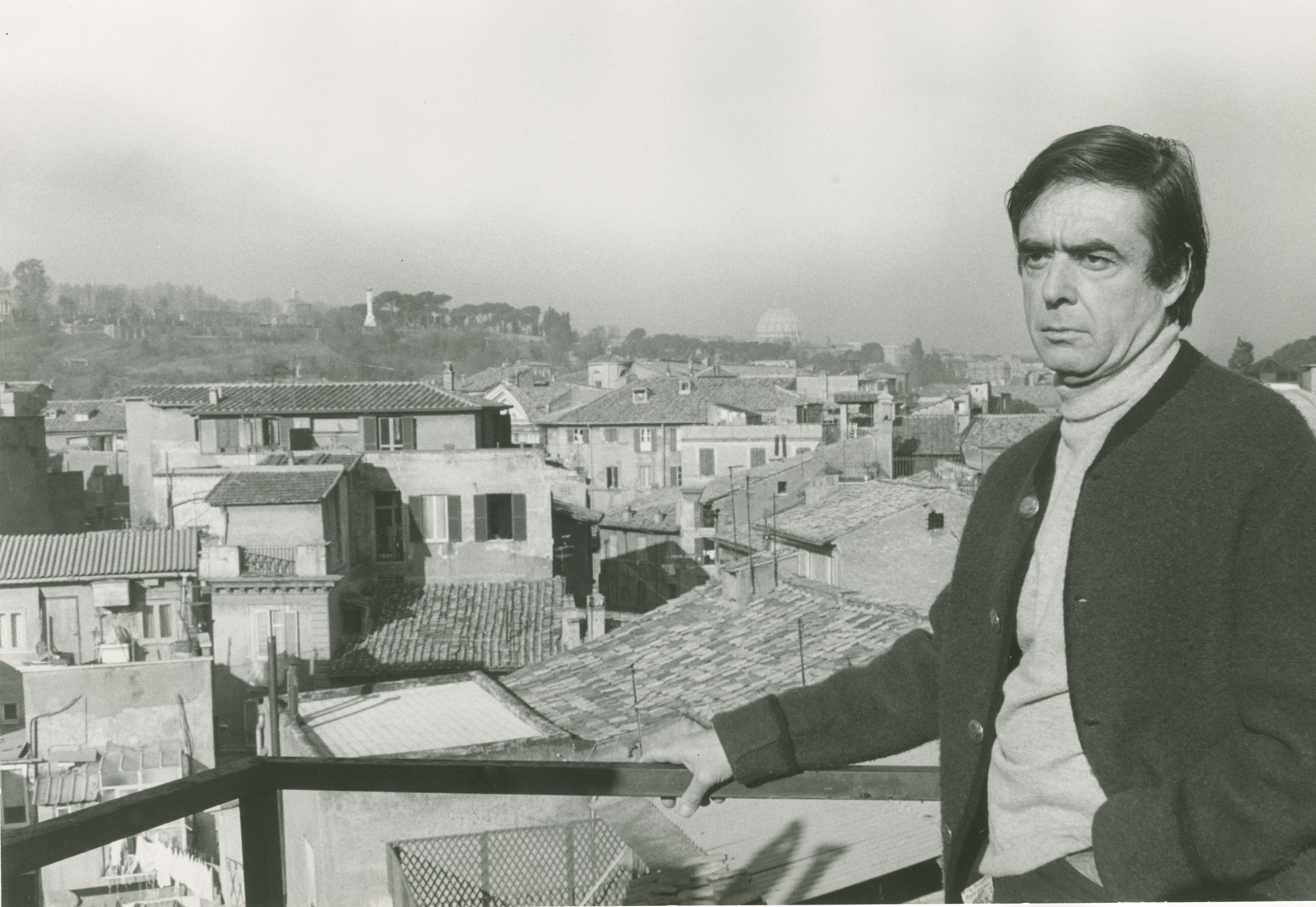
- Bill Pepper in Rome, 1969
- Born: Curtis Bill Pepper; August 30, 1917; Huntington, West Virginia, U.S.
- Died: April 4, 2014 (aged 96); Todi, Italy
- Occupations: Journalist, author
- Spouse: Beverly Pepper (1949—2014)
- Parent(s): Edwina Sheppard Pepper and Curtis Gordon Pepper

Curtis Bill Pepper (August 30, 1917 – April 4, 2014) was an American journalist and author, who published seven books. He was Newsweek's Mediterranean bureau chief in Rome from the mid-1950s to mid-1960s. He also worked for Edward R. Murrow at the Rome bureau of CBS, and covered the Vatican for United Press. His last work, Leonardo, was a biographical novel of Leonardo da Vinci. It was conceived in the years following his studies of the Italian Renaissance at the University of Florence.

== Early life and education ==
Pepper was born Curtis G. Pepper II on August 30, 1917 in Huntington, West Virginia. After a boyhood in Tulsa, Oklahoma, and Champaign, Illinois, he entered the University of Illinois, majoring in art and architecture while writing for the student newspaper, The Daily Illini.

During the summer vacation of his second year, he handled the city-desk phones for the New York Post, followed by front-page reports to the New York World-Telegram while cycling through Europe. Upon his return, he worked for the paper's cultural desk, interviewing stage and screen celebrities, until leaving to edit the Palm Springs News in California.

== Military service ==
During World War II, he joined MIS-X, a specialized branch of military intelligence dealing with combat deception, escape and evasion, and edited the MIS-X manual for the U.S. Army, while also lecturing on this subject at military and air corps bases throughout the U.S. Assigned to the Italian theater, he joined A-Force, a field unit of MIS-X on the 5th Army front – covertly setting up "rat lines" behind the German lines to bring back downed pilots and escaped prisoners of war. From there, he was assigned to MI-9, an escape and evasion command in the British 8th Army, where he was twice cited in dispatches. He received a Bronze Star from the U.S. Army for wartime services.

After V-E Day, he remained in Italy to command a field unit investigating 143 alleged war crimes against U.S. Army and Air Corps personnel. He retired with the rank of major.

== Writing career ==
Pepper returned to Italy to study the Italian Renaissance at the University of Florence, and write a first, unpublished novel. At the same time, he free-lanced magazine articles and film scripts.

In 1951, he joined the Rome bureau of the United Press, and three years later moved to CBS with special reporting for Edward R. Murrow. In 1956, as chief of bureau for Newsweek he produced cover stories on Italy's political leaders, film stars and directors; the death and election of three popes; the theology of the Second Vatican Council; and profiles of kings, presidents and dictators in Jordan, Greece, Israel, Egypt, Tunisia, Spain and Yugoslavia.

He left Newsweek in 1966 to focus on his book writing.

His first book, The Pope's Backyard, was published by Farrar Straus in 1966. After he left Newsweek, his second book, An Artist and the Pope (Grosset & Dunlap, 1968) covered the friendship between Pope John XXIII and the Marxist sculptor, Giacomo Manzù. After sculpting new doors for St. Peter's Basilica, Manzù did a bronze portrait of Pope John and, eventually, the death mask of his beloved friend, with a cast of the hands that had written Pacem in terris. A Book of the Month and Catholic Book Club choice, it was condensed with a double cover in Life, and published in seven foreign editions.

The third book, Christiaan Barnard: One Life (Macmillan, 1969) – a scripted autobiography of the South African surgeon, culminating in the first human-to-human heart transplant, was a main selection of the Literary Guild and the Reader's Digest Book Club with ten foreign editions. The novel Marco (Rawson Associates, 1977) prefiguring the Karen Quinlan-Terri Schiavo cases, was a Book of the Month Club alternate. A fifth work, Kidnapped! (Harmony Books, 1978), focused on the kidnapping industry in Italy through seventeen days of terror experienced by Paolo Lazzaroni, millionaire son of Italy's "Biscuit King".

A sixth book, We The Victors (Doubleday, 1984) emerged from a four-year study of 100 people who survived cancer, the critical survival factors, and how this altered their lives. Serialized in the U.S. and abroad, the book was initially featured on the cover of The New York Times Sunday Magazine.

His biographical novel, Leonardo (Alan C. Hood & Co., 2012), explores the life and work of Leonardo da Vinci, the formation of his universal mind, and development of his art as he emerged from a traumatic childhood – bastard son of a Circassian slave unwanted by his father, yet nurtured by the love of Albi his young stepmother who appears in his evolving portrayals of the Virgin Mary, culminating in a pregnant Mona Lisa.

== Personal life ==
Pepper married sculptor Beverly Pepper in 1948 and their marriage lasted until his death. The couple had two children: the Pulitzer Prize-winning poet Jorie Graham, and photographer, director, and actor John Randolph Pepper.

He divided his time between Umbria in Italy and New York City, and died on April 4, 2014.

== Books ==
- The Pope's Backyard, Farrar Straus & Giroux, 1966. LCCN 66--14151.
- An Artist and the Pope, Grosset & Dunlap, 1968. LCCN 68--29308.
- Christiaan Barnard: One Life—George, G. Harrap, 1970. OCLC 911837077
- Marco, Rawson Associates, 1977. ISBN 0-89256-027-4.
- Kidnapped!: 17 Days of Terror, Harmony Books, 1978. ISBN 9780517534380.
- L'enfant de la nuit, P. Belfond, 1978. ISBN 9782714411846.
- We the Victors, Doubleday, 1984. ISBN 0-385-19122-7.
- Leonardo, Alan C. Hood, 2012. ISBN 978-0-911469-36-3.
- Botero, Fernando; Pepper, Curtis Bill (2013-09-16). Circus: Paintings and Drawings. Glitterati Incorporated. ISBN 978-0988174511.
- Happiness. Fragments of Happiness in the Lives of the Famous and Others Among Us,Gli Ori, 2014 ISBN 8873365442.
