= Relocation service =

For transferring employees or businesses to a new area

Relocation services, employee relocation, military permanent change of station (PCS) or workforce mobility include a range of internal business processes to transfer employees, their families, and/or entire departments of a business to a new location. Like other types of employee benefits, these processes are usually administered by human resources specialists within a corporation. In the military, these processes are administered by the Transportation Management Office (TMO) and Personal Property Shipping Office (PPSO).

Such business processes can include domestic residential services where an employee moves within a country or state as well as international relocation services which include planning for diplomats, managers, etc. working abroad. An agency providing relocation services directs and manages the process of relocation including arranging necessary documents (visa, long-term stay permissions), finding a new house (accommodation), finding a school for children (education), finding a job for the partner or "trailing spouse", arranging a teacher for the family (language training) and introduce expatriates to the local culture. Some companies are similarly offering financial incentives for their workers to return to specific city offices.

== International relocations ==
Dating back to the Dutch East India Company, sending an employee to work in another country (sometimes called a "global assignment" in current HR jargon) has carried considerable costs while theoretically opening the potential for financial returns for the employer.

Reasons why a company might give an employee a global assignment include filling functional needs, developing the employee for upper management, and developing the company itself. Anne-Wil Harzing of the University of Melbourne further categorizes these employees as "bears, bumblebees and spiders". Those playing the role of bears are the long arm of headquarters control. The bumblebees transfer (cross-pollinate) their corporate culture. Harzing's spiders weave the informal communication networks so important in connecting far-flung branches, subsidiaries and all strategic partners.

Responding to a 2005 survey of global assignment management practices commissioned by a US-based third-party relocation management company, 31 percent of surveyed employers indicated that they track exceptions on a per-assignment basis for budgetary purposes, 23 percent track exception on an overall basis in order to identify policy components that need review, and 39 percent do not track the cost or type of exceptions granted. (Seven percent were not able to answer the question.) Of the companies participating in the 2005 Survey of Global Assignment Management Practices, 43 percent indicated that they either outsource or co-source some assignment management services (staffing 1:58 assignees, 7 percent declined to answer).

== Government programs ==
Around 2011, local philanthropists in Tulsa, Oklahoma noticed people who participated in Teach For America continued to live in Tulsa. These philanthropists were then curious about how to replicate this retention of young knowledge workers to the state. The managing director of Tulsa program, Tulsa Remote, previously worked at Teach for America.

Below is a list of participating cities and associated benefits.

List of cities and their incentives
| Year established | Year ended | City | State | Name | Financial incentive | Notes | References |
|---|---|---|---|---|---|---|---|
| 2018 | | Tulsa | Oklahoma | Tulsa Remote | $10,000 | | |
| 2018 | 2023 | | Vermont | Think Vermont | $7,500 | Initial cash incentive was $10,000 | |
| | | Multiple | Indiana | | $5,000 | Cities include Noblesville and Evansville | |
| | | Multiple | Kentucky | | $5,000 | Total of $8,800 package, with an additional $2,500 bonus who bring a spouse working in healthcare or education | |
| 2019 | | Topeka | Kansas | Choose Topeka | $5,000 | Up to $15,000 worth of incentives | |
| 2019 | | The Shoals | Alabama | Remote Shoals | $10,000 | Eligibility includes self-employment or full-time remote employees outside Colbert and Lauderdale counties, make over $52,000 annually | |
| 2020 | 2023 | | Arkansas | Life Works Here | $10,000 | Includes a free bike | |
| 2020 | | Savannah | Georgia | | $2,000 | Incentive is intended to only reimburse moving costs | |
| 2021 | | Multiple | West Virginia | Ascend West Virginia | $12,000 | $10,000 the first year, an additional $2,000 the second, outdoorsy perks include free passes for rock climbing, ziplining and golf, access to free co-working spaces | |

West Virginia's program launched in April 2021 and has had 20,000 applications. The program spans across four regions of the state and welcomed new residents in the following order: Morgantown, Greenbrier County, Eastern panhandle, Greater Elkins, and New River Gorge. The program is funded by a $25 million gift from Brad D. Smith and his wife, Alys Smith, to West Virginia University's Brad and Alys Smith Outdoor Economic Development Collaborative. The program aims to welcome 1,000 remote workers over the next five years since launching in 2021. Topeka's program, Choose Topeka, has had a yearly budget of $300,000, which is funded from an economic development sales tax. In the first six months of the program, Choose Topeka received over 6,000 applications. Kentucky's program incentivizes individuals to move to Mayfield or Graves County. Tulsa's program, Tulsa Remote, is funded by the George Kaiser Family Foundation and intends to continue funding the program "so long as it demonstrates to be a community-enhancing opportunity".

Some motivations for applicants to apply for these relocation programs include lower cost of living, history of the city itself, volunteering opportunities, and access to sports leagues. The cities themselves also have an incentive to offer these programs, including addressing brain drain of losing educated talent and boost a region's technology industry. Midsize, non-coastal cities like Tulsa have been struggling to retain younger professionals, and those who do move to Oklahoma were nearly all over the age of 45 and mostly had incomes below the state average.

In December 2022, Tulsa, Oklahoma claims to have had 2,900 people be accepted into the relocation program and generating an established new sales tax revenue of $2.5 million for Tulsa County and $3.1 million for the state of Oklahoma. Then in 2024, survey results show remote workers who moved to Tulsa saved $25,000 or more on average on annual housing costs than those who did not choose to relocate to Tulsa. With more years to estimate from, researchers in 2024 estimate those who relocated brought in $14.9 million in annual income tax revenue and $5.8 million in sales tax. In 2022, West Virginia claims that they have welcomed 150 new people into the state with a 98% retention rate. It is estimated that the city of Topeka has had a $3.8 million impact to its economy.

These relocation incentive programs are not universally popular. Some have reported that residents local to the regions with these programs feel overlooked for employment in favor of those who receive these incentives. It is also noted that this could "foster community divisions and potentially increase the cost of living, making it harder for long-term residents". For example, the median price of a home in Tulsa increased 9 percent compared with the national average increase of 3.2 percent.

== See also ==
- Moving company
- Remote work
