= Steve Bennett (software entrepreneur) =

American businessman (software entrepreneur)

Stephen M. Bennett is an American businessman. From 2012 until March 20, 2014, he served as the president and chief executive officer of Symantec.

== Early life and education ==
Steve Bennett grew up in Wisconsin and attended Madison West High School. He graduated from the University of Wisconsin–Madison in 1976 with a Bachelor's degree in Business Administration.

== Career ==
Bennett worked at General Electric for 23 years, with roles in GE Capital, appliances, medical systems, and supply management.

Bennett served as president and CEO of Intuit from 2000 to December 2007. During his leadership, the company’s annual revenue rose from under US $1 billion to approximately US $2.7 billion, while operating income increased from US $119 million to US $765 million—expanding operating margins from 13.8% to nearly 29%. Intuit was featured on Fortune's "Best Companies to Work For" list for six consecutive years and was recognized as the Most Admired Software Company in the US.

Bennett joined the board of Symantec in February 2010 and chaired the board from 2011 to 2013. He became Symantec’s CEO in July 2012, succeeding Enrique Salem, and served in that capacity until March 20, 2014. According to The New York Times, he was dismissed due to being "too slow on innovation and new product development," despite earning US $36 million during his 20-month tenure, based on the company's stock price as of Bennett's termination announcement date.
