= Ric Griffith =

American politician

Member of the West Virginia House of Delegates from the 27th district
- In office December 1, 2022 – January 8, 2025
- Succeeded by: Michael Amos

Member of the West Virginia House of Delegates from the 19th district
- In office December 1, 2020 – 2022

Personal details
- Born: February 2, 1949 (age 77) Kenova, West Virginia, U.S.
- Party: Democratic
- Education: University of Toledo College of Pharmacy

Ric Griffith is a Democratic former member of the West Virginia House of Delegates. He assumed office on December 1, 2020, representing the 27th District, which encompasses parts of Cabell and Wayne County, and was reelected to a second term in 2022. He declined to run for reelection in 2024, choosing instead to run for West Virginia's 5th Senate district, which covers all of Cabell County and northern Wayne County. He lost the general election on November 5, 2024.

A former mayor of Kenova, WV, his house district was formerly part of the 19th District prior to 2021 redistricting following the 2020 U.S. census.

== Early life and education ==
Griffith graduated from Ceredo-Kenova High School and received a degree from the University of Toledo College of Pharmacy.

== Government service ==
Griffith served two terms as Kenova City Council President and two terms as Mayor of Kenova.

== The Pumpkin House ==
Griffith is well known for the Kenova Pumpkin House, which displays several thousand jack-o'-lanterns on his property each Halloween. Carving all the pumpkins is a community event, with around 20 dedicated volunteers helping. The pumpkin display is part of Ceredo-Kenova AutumnFest, a community-wide event which has a parade, scavenger hunt, and haunted trail. In 2019, he displayed over 3,000, one for every resident of his home town of Kenova, West Virginia.

During the COVID-19 pandemic, Griffith decided it was too risky to do the display at his home due to the large crowds that congregate to view it. He opted instead to have members of the community come by and pick up a pumpkin so it can be carved and displayed at their own homes. He created printed out instructions to go with each pumpkin to help the children and their families carve them.
