= Lew Payton =

American actor

Lew Payton (June 27, 1874 – May 27, 1945) was an African American film actor, stage performer, and writer known for several films and stage productions including Chocolate Dandies with Josephine Baker, Smash Your Baggage (1932), Jezebel (1938), On Such a Night (1937), and Lady for a Night (1942) featuring John Wayne and Joan Blondell. In Lady for a Night, he performed Napoleon, the Alderson Family's manservant for characters Stephen Alderson (played by Philip Merivale) and Katherine Alderson (played by Edith Barrett).

== Early life ==
Payton was born on June 27, 1874, in Huntington, West Virginia.

== Film and stage career ==
Payton performed as an actor in several films and stage productions. With Noble Sissle, Payton co-wrote and performed in Chocolate Dandies, a 1924 film that launched the career of Josephine Baker. Chocolate Dandies, The : "New Musical Comedy" by Noble Sissle and Lew Payton. Music and lyrics by Noble Sissle and Eubie Blake. Produced at the Colonial Theatre in Boston, the film also featured Eubie Blake and Amanda Randolph.

== Writing ==
In 1937, Payton authored "Did Adam Sin? and Other Stories of Negro Life in Comedy-Drama and Sketches." As a member of "Black Hollywood," Payton wrote the book as an attempt to teach other African-Americans the art of screenwriting.

== Film and stage productions ==
- The Chocolate Dandies (September 1, 1924 – November 22, 1924) as "Mose Washington"
- Harlem (February 20, 1929 – May 1929) as "Pa Williams"
- The Boundary Line (February 5, 1930 – Mar 1930) as "Elbert"
- Solid South (October 14, 1930 – Nov 1930) as "Jasper"
- Never No More (January 7, 1932 – Jan 1932) as "Deacon"
- Bridal Wise (May 30, 1932 – Sep 1932) as "Tom"
- Smash Your Baggage (October 29, 1932)
- Jezebel (December 19, 1933 – Jan 1934) as "Uncle Billy"
- Valiant Is the Word for Carrie (1936) as "Lons John". Starring Gladys George.
- Did Adam Sin? (1936), a stage production written by Payton and performed by the Chicago Negro Unit of the Federal Theatre Project from 1936 to 1939.
- Racing Lady (1937) as "Joe". Starring Ann Dvorak.
- Wells Fargo (1937) as "Sam – Pryor's Butler"
- On Such a Night (1937) Starring Grant Richards and Karen Morley
- Jezebel (1938) as "Uncle Billy". Starring Bette Davis and Henry Fonda.
- The Lady's from Kentucky (1939) as "Sixty". Starring George Raft
- The Sun Never Sets (1939) as "the Village Chief". Starring Douglas Fairbanks Jr.
- Lady for a Night (1942) as "Napoleon", Alderson Family's Servant"
- Presenting Lily Mars (1943) as "Thornway's Butler". Directed by Norman Taurog featuring Judy Garland

== Death ==
Payton died on May 27, 1945, in Los Angeles, California, USA.

== Discography ==
- Lew Payton – A Musical Autobiography Of Louis Armstrong 1923–1925 album art All The Wrongs You've Done Me (They're Bound To Come Back To You) (as Ley Payton) Satchmo (2) – A Musical Autobiography Of Louis Armstrong 1923–1925; 4 versions Decca (1959)
