= Lady for a Night =

1942 film

- Film poster
- Directed by: Leigh Jason
- Written by: Garrett Fort
- Produced by: Albert J. Cohen
- Starring: Joan Blondell; John Wayne; Ray Middleton; Philip Merivale; Blanche Yurka; Edith Barrett; Leonid Kinskey
- Cinematography: Norbert Brodine
- Edited by: Ernest J. Nims
- Music by: David Buttolph
- Production company: Republic Pictures
- Distributed by: Republic Pictures
- Release date: January 5, 1942
- Running time: 87 minutes
- Country: United States
- Language: English

John Wayne and Blondell.

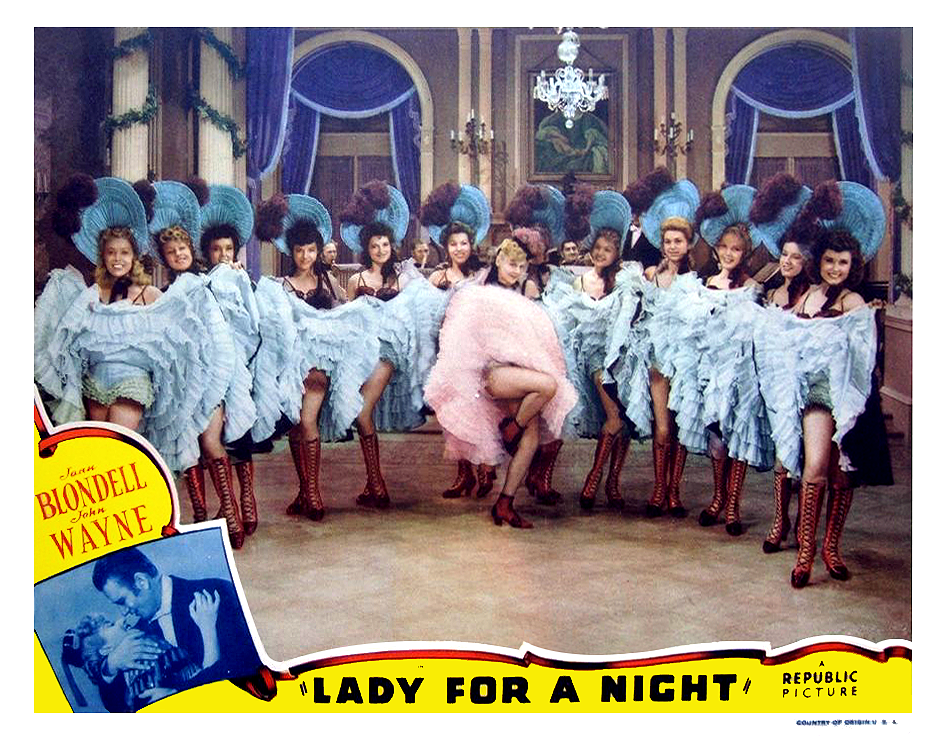
Colored lobby card circa January 1942.

Lady for a Night is a 1942 American drama film starring Joan Blondell and John Wayne. The World War II B-17 bomber the Memphis Belle is named after a steamboat in this film. It is also known as The Lady from New Orleans, Memphis Belle and Lady of New Orleans.

The social climber female owner of a casino steamboat gains the ownership of plantation, and negotiates her marriage to the previous owner in order to gain entry in the upper class. Her new in-laws resent her, and she survives a poisoning attempt. When her husband is murdered instead, the widow is framed for his murder.

== Plot ==
Social climber Jenny Blake owns the casino steamboat Memphis Belle, together with the influential Jack Morgan. Most of the customers are from the upper class, but they have little respect for Jenny and her—in their opinion—vulgar occupation. Jack is secretly in love with Jenny. To show her what it really is she aspires to, he arranges for her to be made queen of the Mardi Gras festivities. This angers the upper crust of society, and she is mocked in public. However, she does not give up.

She decides to use one of the old plantation owners, Alan Alderson, to fulfill her dream. Alan is burdened with debt and manages to lose his plantation, "The Shadows", gambling at the casino. Jenny offers to forgive his debts if he marries her. Alan agrees, and Jenny secures a respectable position in society. Jack is devastated by Jenny's marriage, and does not try to save the Memphis Belle when it catches fire. Everyone in Alan's family has a hard time accepting Jenny, except his aunt Katherine, who is suffering from mental illness.

Jack goes on to sabotage the relationship between Jenny and Alan. He is helped by Alan's aunt Julia. Julia starts off with insinuations that Jenny has an improper relation with Jack and goes on to try to ruin a ball Jenny is hosting. Jack saves Jenny and the ball by using his political influence to make the guests attend, even though Julia has tried to keep them away. Jenny is almost killed when Julia goes on to let her ride in a carriage pulled by a blind horse.

Jenny retaliates by ordering Julia to leave the plantation. The infuriated Julia then mixes a poisoned drink meant for Jenny, but Alan beats her to it and dies from drinking it. Jenny is accused of murdering her husband and put on trial. Aunt Katherine is the only person who knows that Julia mixed the drink, but she is forced by her sister to testify against Jenny in court. Jenny is convicted of murder, but Katherine soon confesses that it was Julia who mixed the drink, and a few years earlier also killed Katherine's fiancé in a fit of jealousy. Jenny is cleared of all charges. She meets Jack and they start working together again. She finally gives up her dream to climb the social ladder and accepts Jack's proposal to marry him.

== Cast ==
- Joan Blondell as Jenny "Jen" Blake Alderson
- John Wayne as Jackson Morgan
- Ray Middleton as Alan Alderson
- Philip Merivale as Stephen Alderson
- Blanche Yurka as Julia Anderson
- Edith Barrett as Katherine Alderson
- Leonid Kinskey as Boris, Jack's Bodyguard
- Hattie Noel as Chloe, Jenny's Maid
- Montagu Love as Judge
- Carmel Myers as Mrs. Dickson, the Mayor's Wife
- Dorothy Burgess as Flo
- Guy Usher as Governor
- Ivan Miller as Mayor Dickson
- Patricia Knox as Mabel
- Lew Payton as Napoleon, Alderson's Servant
- Eula Morgan as Dowager

== See also ==
- John Wayne filmography
