= The Chocolate Dandies =

1924 Broadway musical

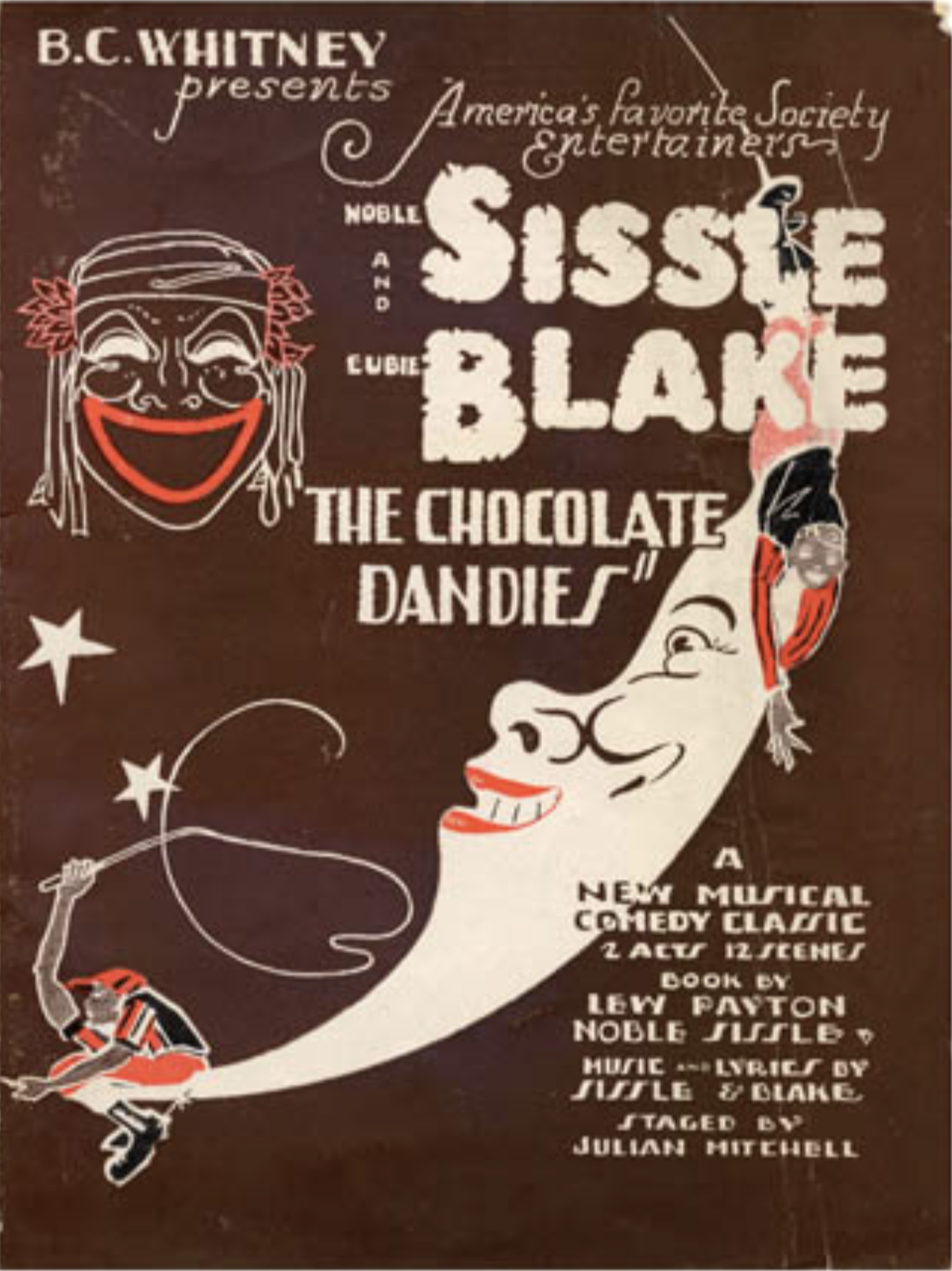
- Music: Eubie Blake
- Lyrics: Noble Sissle
- Book: Noble Sissle & Lew Payton
- Premiere: September 1, 1924: New Colonial Theatre

The Chocolate Dandies is a Broadway musical in two acts that opened September 1, 1924, at the New Colonial Theatre and ran for 96 performances – finishing November 22, 1924.

== Initial production ==
After touring for six months under the title In Bamville, the show was renamed and arrived in New York. The 1924 debut of The Chocolate Dandies was produced by Bertram Cecil Whitney (1870–1929). Eubie Blake composed the music; Noble Sissle wrote the lyrics and co-authored the book; Lew Payton was also co-author; Julian Mitchell staged it; Lorenzo C. Calduel (aka Lawrence Caldwell; born 1888, Mexico) scored the orchestral and vocal parts; John Newton Booth, Jr. (1890–1949), Kiviette, (Note: Kiviette (née Yetta Shimansky; 1893–1978) was a theatrical costume designer who had once worked for Hilarie Mahieu Costumes, Inc. – Hilarie Albert Mahieu (1877–1964). Around 1930, she had a widely publicized divorce from Herman Pomeranz, MD (1885–1956). She was charged in court for running a scheme, which failed, to entrap Pomeranz in an affair. In 2010, New York became one of the last of the fifty states to allow no-fault divorces even in cases where there was no mutual consent to the divorce. Before that, she was married and divorced from Abel Kiviat (1892–1991), a National Champion middle distance runner from Staten Island.) and Hugh Willoughby (1891–1973) designed the costumes; Tony Greshoff (né Anton Greshoff; 1870–1943) did the lighting design.

== Reviews ==
. . . without doubt the most picturesque product that a colored company ever presented to Broadway, with the possible exception of Williams and Walker's classical production Abyssinia [1906]; and it is not overstepping bounds in comparing its beautiful settings with the best that Broadway affords.

— F. J. Accoe, New York Interstate Tattler, 1924

== See also ==
- The Chocolate Dandies jazz combos, spin-offs from the musical production
- Josephine Baker, who was in the show's chorus line before she became famous
