= Marrowbone Creek (West Virginia) =

Stream in West Virginia, U.S.

Coordinates: 37°51′19″N 82°24′54″W

Marrowbone Creek is a stream in the U.S. state of West Virginia.

Marrowbone Creek was named for an incident when hungry pioneers near the creek ate bone marrow from a buffalo carcass.

== See also ==
- List of rivers of West Virginia
