= Robert H. Plymale =

American politician

Member of the West Virginia Senate from the 5th district
- In office December 1, 1992 – December 1, 2024
- Preceded by: Homer Heck
- Succeeded by: Scott Fuller

Personal details
- Born: February 21, 1955 (age 71) Huntington, West Virginia, U.S.
- Party: Democratic
- Spouse: Jennifer Thompson
- Children: Lauren Elise; Allison Lynn; James Jeffrey
- Education: Marshall University

Robert Hugh Plymale (born February 21, 1955) is a former Democratic member of the West Virginia Senate, representing the 5th district from 1992 to 2024. At the time of his retirement, Plymale was the longest-tenured actively serving Democratic member of the West Virginia Senate and had the second longest tenure in the chamber after President pro tempore Donna Boley.

== Legislature ==
In 2020, Plymale tied for the most conservative voting record of any Democrat in the West Virginia Legislature, according to the American Conservative Union. In 2015, Plymale was the only Democrat to cross party lines and vote for Bill Cole to become West Virginia Senate president after Republicans took control of the Senate following the 2014 elections.

Prior to Republican control of the Senate, Plymale served as Chair of the Committee on Transportation during the 71st Legislature (1992-1994); Chair of the Committee on Pensions during the 72nd, 73rd, 74th and 75th Legislatures (1994-2002); and Chair of the Committee on Education during the 76th, 77th, 78th, 79th, 80th and 81st Legislatures (2002-2014).

In 2022, Plymale was selected to be the whip of the Democratic caucus for the 86th Legislature.

== Personal ==
Plymale also serves as associate vice president for economic development for the Marshall Research Corporation (MURC), COO of the Center for Business and Economic Research (CBER) and COO of the Appalachian Transportation Institute. He also serves as co-president of the Keith Albee Performing Arts Center, Inc. (KAPAC), a member of the Wayne County Economic Development Authority (WCEDA), and chairs the June Harless Center for Rural Education Advisory Committee. In August 2020, Plymale was appointed to the Federal Communications Commission Intergovernmental Advisory Committee.

He appeared on Jamie Oliver's Food Revolution — Episode 3 as the State Senator who dined at a meal prepared by high school students from Huntington.

== Election results ==
West Virginia Senate District 5 (Position B) election, 2020
Party	Candidate	Votes	%
Democratic	Robert H. Plymale (incumbent)	22,808	53.63%
Republican	Charles R. Shaffer	19,724	46.37%
Total votes		42,532	100.0%

West Virginia Senate District 5 (Position B) election, 2016
Party	Candidate	Votes	%
Democratic	Robert H. Plymale (incumbent)	22,863	60.24%
Republican	Tyson Smith	15,092	39.76%
Total votes		37,955	100.0%

West Virginia Senate District 5 (Position B) election, 2012
Party	Candidate	Votes	%
Democratic	Robert H. Plymale (incumbent)	28,090	100.0%
Total votes		28,090	100.0%

West Virginia Senate District 5 (Position B) election, 2008
Party	Candidate	Votes	%
Democratic	Robert H. Plymale (incumbent)	23,763	66.97%
Republican	Stephen L. Hall	11,722	33.03%
Total votes		35,485	100.0%

West Virginia Senate District 5 (Position B) election, 2004
Party	Candidate	Votes	%
Democratic	Robert H. Plymale (incumbent)	24,268	61.79%
Republican	Stephen L. Hall	15,006	38.21%
Total votes		39,274	100.0%

West Virginia Senate District 5 (Position B) election, 2000
Party	Candidate	Votes	%
Democratic	Robert H. Plymale (incumbent)	23,179	100.0%
Total votes		23,179	100.0%

West Virginia Senate District 5 (Position B) election, 1996
Party	Candidate	Votes	%
Democratic	Robert H. Plymale (incumbent)	21,023	100.0%
Total votes		21,023	100.0%

West Virginia Senate District 5 (Position B) election, 1992
Party	Candidate	Votes	%
Democratic	Robert H. Plymale (incumbent)	22,217	100.0%
Total votes		22,217	100.0%
