= Mike Woelfel =

American politician

Minority Leader of the West Virginia Senate
- Incumbent
- Assumed office January 11, 2023
- Preceded by: Stephen Baldwin

Member of the West Virginia Senate from the 5th district
- Incumbent
- Assumed office December 1, 2014 Serving with Scott Fuller
- Preceded by: Evan Jenkins

Personal details
- Born: June 21, 1954 (age 72) Huntington, West Virginia, United States
- Party: Democratic
- Spouse: Julia Woelfel
- Children: 2
- Education: Marshall University (BA); West Virginia University (JD)

Mike Woelfel (born June 21, 1954) is an American politician who is a Democratic member of the West Virginia Senate representing the 5th district. The 5th district includes all of Cabell County and a small portion of northern Wayne County. In 2022, Woelfel was chosen as Minority Leader of the Senate.

== Political career ==
Woelfel was first elected in 2014 to succeed Evan Jenkins, who left the Democratic Party and chose to run for Congress as a Republican. Woelfel's victory was a rare pick up for the Democratic Party during a year that otherwise saw major Republican gains in West Virginia. In 2020, Woelfel was appointed as Minority Whip for the Senate Democratic caucus. Two years later, Woelfel became the Minority Leader after his predecessor, Stephen Baldwin, lost re-election.

== Personal life ==
Woelfel maintains a private personal injury law firm with his son, Matthew Woelfel. Prior to his time in the Senate, Woelfel served as an assistant prosecuting attorney in Cabell County and was appointed, on a part-time basis, to a juvenile judicial office for the Supreme Court of Appeals. He also served as an adjunct professor at Marshall University.

== Election results ==
West Virginia's 5th Senate district, 2022
Party	Candidate	Votes	%
Democratic	Mike Woelfel (incumbent)	13,542	54.0
Republican	Melissa Clark	11,552	46.0
Total votes		25,094	100.0
Democratic hold			

West Virginia Senate District 5 (Position A) election, 2018
Party	Candidate	Votes	%
Democratic	Mike Woelfel (incumbent)	20,305	59.66%
Republican	Larry Brooke Lunsford	13,732	40.34%
Total votes		34,037	100.0%

West Virginia Senate District 5 (Position A) election, 2014
Party	Candidate	Votes	%
Democratic	Mike Woelfel	12,511	49.80%
Republican	Vicki Dunn-Marshall	11,818	47.04%
Independent	Roy L. Ramey	793	3.16%
Total votes		25,122	100.0%

West Virginia Senate
Preceded by Stephen Baldwin	Minority Leader of the West Virginia Senate; January 11, 2023 – present	Incumbent
