= West Virginia's 5th Senate district =

American legislative district

West Virginia's 5th State Senate district
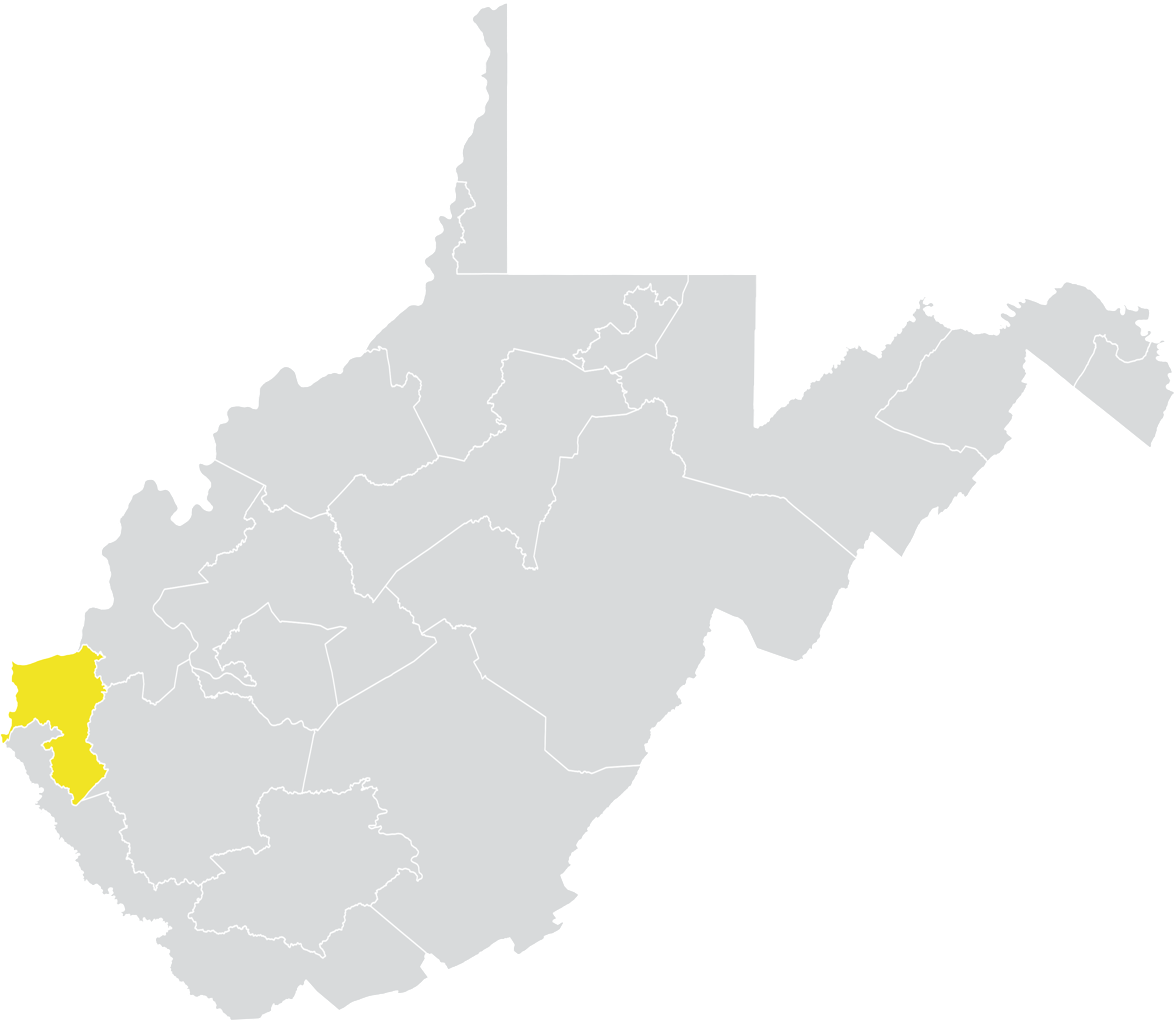
Senator
Mike Woelfel; D–Huntington
Scott Fuller; R–Kenova
- Demographics: 88% White; 5% Black; 1% Hispanic; 2% Asian; 2% Native American
- Population (2021): 106,335

West Virginia's 5th Senate district is one of 17 districts in the West Virginia Senate. It is currently represented by Democrat Mike Woelfel and Republican Scott Fuller. All districts in the West Virginia Senate elect two members to staggered four-year terms.

== Geography ==
District 5 is based in the city of Huntington, covering all of Cabell County and parts of northern Wayne County. It also includes the communities of Milton, Barboursville, Culloden, Lesage, Pea Ridge, Ceredo, and Kenova.

The district is located entirely within West Virginia's 1st congressional district, and overlaps with the 22nd through 29th districts of the West Virginia House of Delegates. It borders the states of Ohio and Kentucky.

== Recent election results ==
=== 2024 ===
2024 West Virginia Senate election, District 5
Primary election
Party	Candidate	Votes	%
Republican	Scott Fuller	3,753	38.8
Republican	Josh Mathis	3,515	36.4
Republican	Dallas K. Thacker	2,401	24.8
Total votes		9,669	100.0
Democratic	Ric Griffith	6,828	100.0
Total votes		6,828	100.0
General election
Republican	Scott Fuller	19,951	51.1
Democratic	Ric Griffith	19,098	48.9
Total votes		39,049	100
Republican gain from Democratic			

=== 2022 ===
West Virginia's 5th Senate district, 2022
Party	Candidate	Votes	%
Democratic	Mike Woelfel (incumbent)	13,542	54.0
Republican	Melissa Clark	11,552	46.0
Total votes		25,094	100.0
Democratic hold			

== Historical election results ==
=== 2020 ===
2020 West Virginia Senate election, District 5
Primary election
Party	Candidate	Votes	%
Republican	Charles Shaffer	4,601	54.0
Republican	Glendon Watts	3,925	46.0
Total votes		8,526	100
General election
Democratic	Robert Plymale (incumbent)	22,808	53.6
Republican	Charles Shaffer	19,724	46.4
Total votes		42,532	100
Democratic hold			

=== 2018 ===
2018 West Virginia Senate election, District 5
Party	Candidate	Votes	%
Democratic	Mike Woelfel (incumbent)	20,305	59.7
Republican	Larry Brooke Lunsford	13,732	40.3
Total votes		34,037	100
Democratic hold			

=== 2016 ===
2016 West Virginia Senate election, District 5
Party	Candidate	Votes	%
Democratic	Robert Plymale (incumbent)	22,863	60.2
Republican	Tyson Smith	15,092	39.8
Total votes		37,955	100
Democratic hold			

=== 2014 ===
2014 West Virginia Senate election, District 5
Primary election
Party	Candidate	Votes	%
Democratic	Mike Woelfel	5,218	74.5
Democratic	Robert Alexander	1,784	25.5
Total votes		7,002	100
General election
Democratic	Mike Woelfel	12,511	49.8
Republican	Vicki Dunn-Marshall	11,818	47.0
Independent	Roy Ramey	793	3.2
Total votes		25,122	100
Democratic gain from Republican			

=== 2012 ===
2012 West Virginia Senate election, District 5
Party	Candidate	Votes	%
Democratic	Robert Plymale (incumbent)	28,090	100
Total votes		28,090	100
Democratic hold			

=== Federal and statewide results ===
Year	Office	Results
2020	President	Trump 59.8 – 38.5%
2020	Senate	Capito 63.1 – 34.5%
2020	Governor	Justice 58.0 – 38.4%
2018	Senate	Manchin 57.8 – 39.1%
2016	President	Trump 61.2 – 33.5%
2016	Governor	Justice 55.8 – 35.4%
