= Scott Fuller =

American politician

Member of the West Virginia Senate from the 5th district
- Incumbent
- Assumed office December 1, 2024 Serving with Mike Woelfel
- Preceded by: Robert Plymale

Personal details
- Born: Huntington, West Virginia, U.S.
- Party: Republican
- Education: Marshall University (BA); University of Charleston (MS)

Scott Allen Fuller is an American politician serving as a Republican member of the West Virginia Senate for the 5th district. He served 29 years in the West Virginia Army National Guard, 20 years on the Huntington Police Department, and six years in the United States Navy. He retired from the Huntington Police Department in 2010 and the WV National Guard in 2017. Fuller graduated from Marshall University with a Bachelor of Arts and from the University of Charleston with a Master of Science.
