= List of faculty and alumni of Marshall University =

This is a list of notable people associated with Marshall University in Huntington, West Virginia, United States.

== Faculty ==
=== Academics ===
- Charles G. Bailey, professor of journalism, faculty manager of WMUL
- Josh Brunty, current professor of digital forensics, current head coach of US Cyber Team
- Maurice G. Burnside, former professor
- Edith Clarke, former mathematics and physics professor
- Margaret Buchanan Cole, former mathematics professor
- Ken Hechler, former professor
- Ned D. Heindel, former professor of Organic Chemistry
- Sara Henning, professor of English and Creative Writing
- Evan Jenkins, former professor of business law
- Ray Keener, associate professor of legal environment
- Ronald J. Oakerson, former professor of political science
- Carrie Oeding, former assistant professor of literature
- Joel Peckham, current professor of literature
- Timothy F. Sedgwick, former professor
- Jean Edward Smith, former professor of political science
- Paul W. Whear, former professor of music theory and musical composition
- John H. Wotiz, former professor of chemistry

=== Administration ===
- Dan Angel, former president
- David Braine, former athletic director
- Champ Clark, former president
- Constantine W. Curris, former dean of student personnel programs
- Donald Dedmon, former president
- Jeffery Elwell, former professor and chair of the department of theatre and dance
- Jerome A. Gilbert, former president
- J. Wade Gilley, former president
- Roy Hawley, former athletic director for Marshall University and West Virginia University, namesake of Hawley Field
- Stephen J. Kopp, former president
- John Laidley, a founder of Marshall University
- Joe McMullen, former athletic director
- Mildred Mitchell-Bateman, former professor and chair of the department of psychology
- Lee Moon, former athletic director
- Dale F. Nitzschke, former president
- Christian Spears, athletic director
- Ruth C. Sullivan, founder of the West Virginia Autism Training Center at Marshall University
- John D. Williams, former president

=== Athletics ===
Baseball

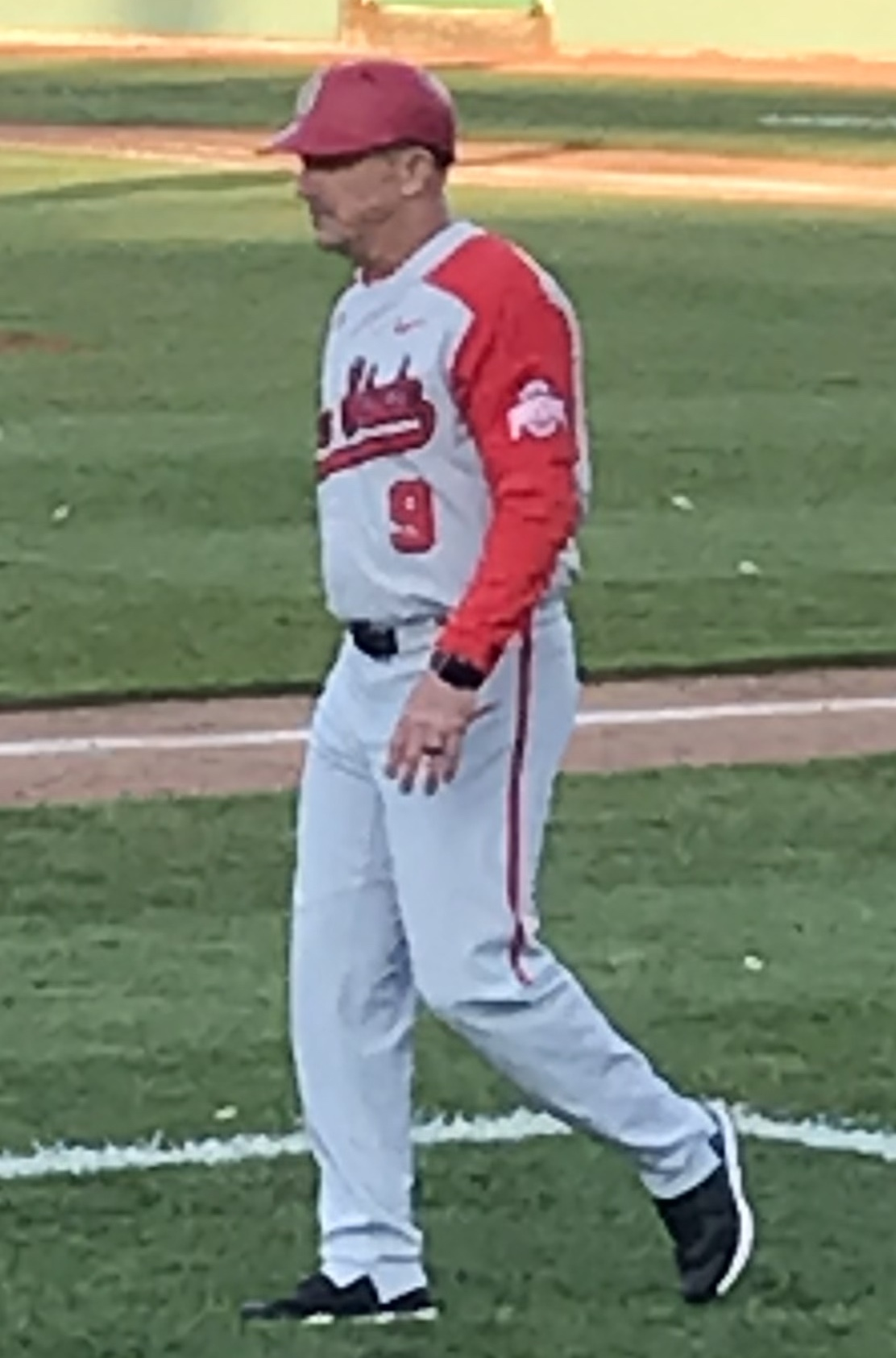
Greg Beals

- Greg Beals, current head coach
- Harrison Briggs, former head coach of Marshall Thundering Herd baseball and Marshall Thundering Herd football
- Boyd Chambers, former head coach of Marshall Thundering Herd baseball and Marshall Thundering Herd football, former athletic director
- Herbert Cramer, former head coach of Marshall Thundering Herd baseball, Marshall Thundering Herd men's basketball and Marshall Thundering Herd football, former athletic director
- Tom Donnelly, current associate head coach
- Jim Koerner, former assistant coach of Marshall Thundering Herd baseball
- Russ Meredith, former head coach of Marshall Thundering Herd baseball, Marshall Thundering Herd men's basketball and Marshall Thundering Herd football
- David Perno, former assistant coach
- Skeeter Shelton, former head coach
- Burton Shipley, former head coach of Marshall Thundering Herd baseball, and Marshall Thundering Herd football
- Brad Stromdahl, former assistant coach
- Johnny Stuart, former head coach of Marshall Thundering Herd baseball, and Marshall Thundering Herd men's basketball
- Jeff Waggoner, former head coach
- Johnny Watson, former head coach of Marshall Thundering Herd baseball

Basketball

- Stu Aberdeen, former head coach
- Dana Altman, former head coach
- Kenny Blakeney, former assistant coach
- Jeff Boals, former assistant coach
- Aki Collins, former assistant coach
- Tom Dandelet, former head coach of Marshall Thundering Herd men's basketball and Marshall Thundering Herd football
- Bob Daniels, former head coach
- Henry Dickerson, former assistant coach

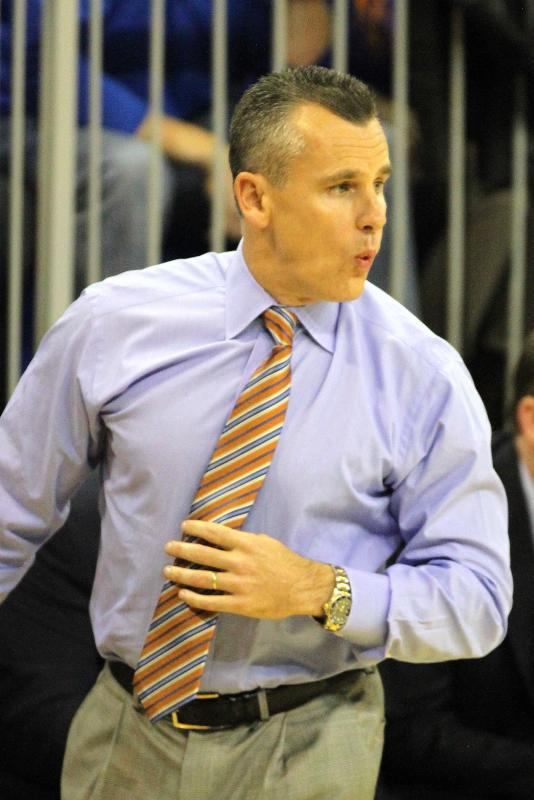
Billy Donovan

- Billy Donovan, former head coach
- Chris Duhon, former assistant coach
- Shawn Finney, former assistant coach
- Dwight Freeman, former head coach
- Anthoney Grant, former head coach
- Cam Henderson, namesake for Cam Henderson Center, former head coach Marshall Thundering Herd men's basketball, Marshall Thundering Herd baseball and Marshall Thundering Herd football
- Tom Herrion, former head coach
- Rick Huckabay, former head coach
- Cornelius Jackson, current head coach
- Ron Jirsa, former head coach
- Ellis T. Johnson, former head coach
- Donnie Jones, former head coach
- Brett Nelson, former assistant coach
- John Pelphrey, former assistant coach
- Jule Rivlin, former head coach
- Juliene Simpson, former head coach
- Bob Starkey, former assistant coach
- Bill Strickling, former head coach
- Carl Tacy, former head coach
- Darren Tillis, former assistant coach
- Stewart Way, former head coach
- Greg White, former head coach
- Bob Zuffelato, former head coach

Football

- Greg Adkins, former assistant head coach
- Lou Anarumo, former defensive back coach
- Don Ault, former assistant head coach
- Jerry Azzinaro, former defensive linemen coach
- Dallas Baker, former wide receiver coach
- Oree Banks, former assistant head coach
- Chris Barclay, former running backs coach
- George Barlow, former linebacker coach
- Tim Billings, former defensive coordinator, 1x Ohio Valley Conference Coach of the Year
- Greg Blue, former defensive quality control
- Deke Brackett, former kicking coach
- Ahmad Bradshaw, NFL running back
- Gunter Brewer, former wide receiver coach
- Thomas Brown, former running back coach, Super Bowl LVI Champion
- George Chaump, former head coach
- Jim Donnan, former head coach
- Frank Ellwood, former head coach
- George Ford, first head coach of Marshall Thundering Herd football and former head coach of Marshall Thundering Herd baseball
- Doc Holliday, former head coach, 2x Conference USA Football Coach of the Year
- Charles Huff, former head coach
- Jack Lengyel, former head coach
- John Maulbetsch, former head coach
- Alfred McCray, former head coach
- Rick Minter, former head coach
- Perry Moss, former head coach
- Stan Parrish, former head coach
- Pete Pederson, former head coach
- Sonny Randle, former head coach
- Pearl Rardin, former head coach
- Herb Royer, former head coach
- Charlie Snyder, former head coach
- Charles Tallman, former head coach
- Rick Tolley, former head coach
- William G. Vinal, former head coach

Soccer

- Conor Branson, former assistant coach
- Josh Faga, current assistant coach
- Chris Grassie, current head coach
- Bob Gray, former head coach

Softball

- Sarah Dawson, former assistant coach
- Megan Smith, former head coach
- Shonda Stanton, former head coach

Track & field

- Jack F. Shaw, former assistant coach
- Don Williams, former head coach

== Alumni ==
=== Arts and entertainment ===
- Tom Bailey, fiction writer, Pushcart Prize winner
- Nelson S. Bond, fantasy and science fiction writer, Nebula Author Emeritus award winner
- Aleshia Brevard, author and actress of stage, screen, and televisionol
- Wilmer Calderon, actor; notable roles as Diego in Borderline, Bosch, and The Shield
- Joe Chrest, actor, earned his undergraduate degree from Marshall; notable roles in 21 Jump Street, 22 Jump Street, and Stranger Things
- Michael G. Cornelius, author and scholar specializing in early British literature, nominated for both an Independent Press Award and an American Library Association Award

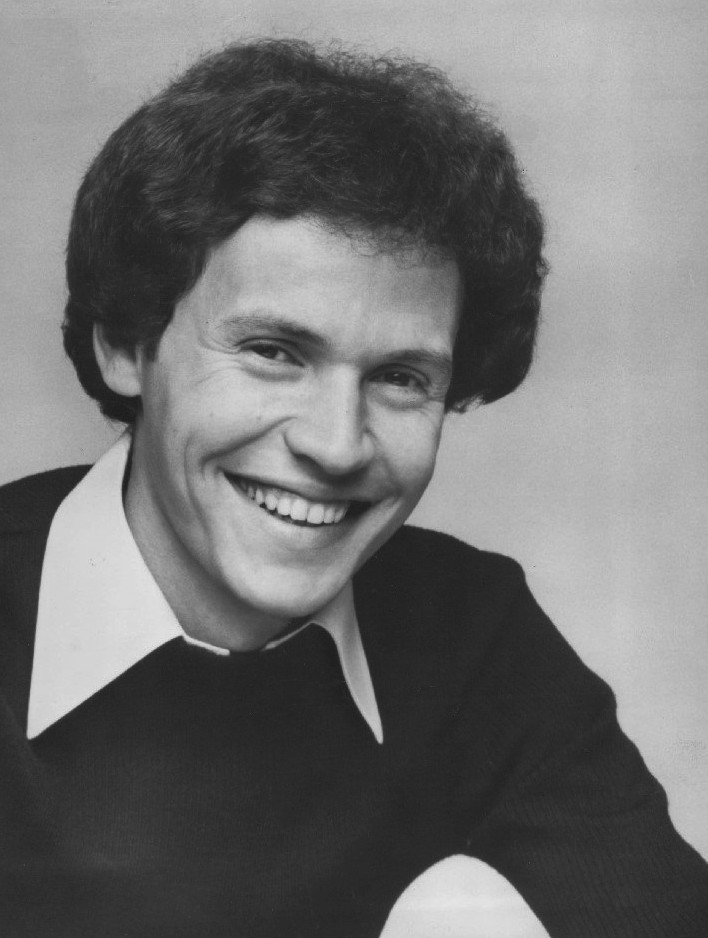
Billy Crystal

- Billy Crystal, actor, and comedian, was awarded and accepted a baseball scholarship at Marshall University but did not graduate; received six Primetime Emmy Awards and a Tony Award as well as nominations for three Grammy Awards and three Golden Globe Awards

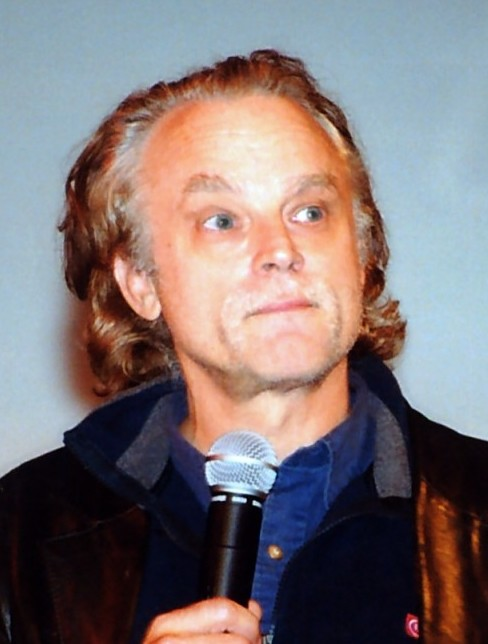
Brad Dourif

- Brad Dourif, Academy Award-nominated actor, the voice of Chucky in the Child's Play film series; The Lord of the Rings and Deadwood; stepson of William Campbell, captain at Royal and Ancient St. Andrew's Course in Scotland and 15-time winner of WV Amateur Golf Tournament; did not graduate
- Conchata Ferrell, actress; notable role as Berta the housekeeper for all 12 seasons of Two and a Half Men
- Darrell Fetty, actor, screenwriter, and producer; nominated for an Emmy Award for his work on the History miniseries Hatfields & McCoys
- John Fiedler, actor and movie producer; acted and produced over 100 productions including the voice of Piglet in Disney's Winnie the Pooh productions
- Craig Johnson, mystery novel author best known for his Sheriff Walt Longmire novel series
- Thomas M. Kromer, modernist and writer; Waiting for Nothing (1935)
- Jennings Harold Lane, former Southern Gospel singer, co-founder of The Gospel Harmony Boys
- Clint McElroy, radio personality, podcaster, known for his work on the podcast The Adventure Zone and for hosting several FM radio shows in West Virginia, adjunct professor in the Department of Theatre at Marshall University

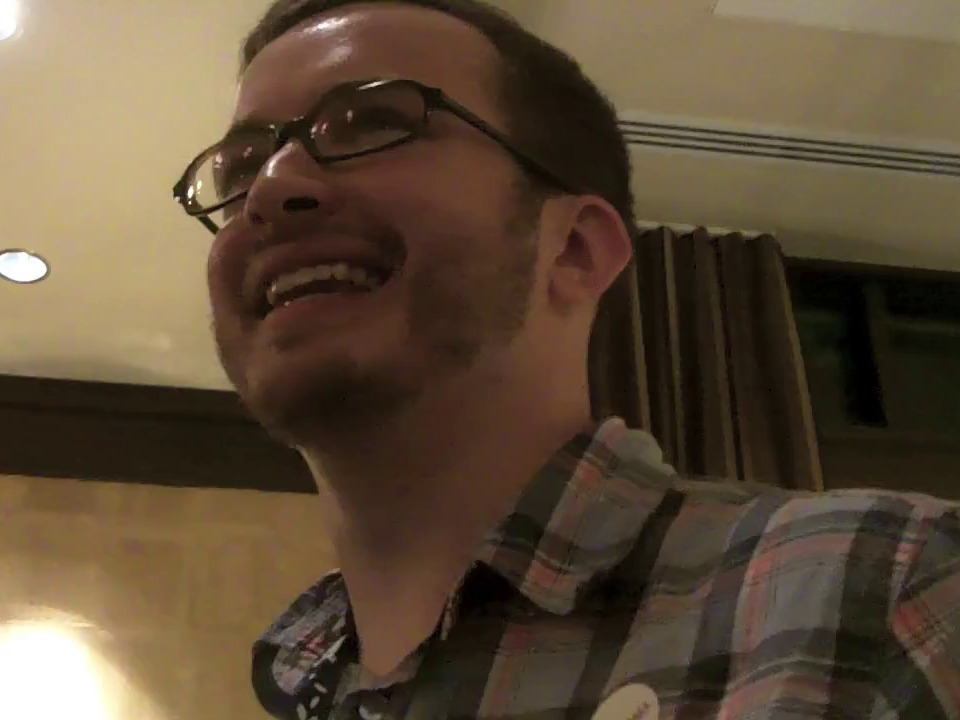
Griffin McElroy

- Griffin McElroy, podcaster, voice actor known for My Brother, My Brother and Me and The Adventure Zone, co-founder of the video game journalism website Polygon, listed as a Forbes "30 Under 30" media luminary in 2017
- Justin McElroy, radio personality, podcaster, voice actor known for My Brother, My Brother and Me, The Adventure Zone, and Sawbones, co-founder of video game journalism website Polygon
- Sydnee McElroy, podcaster, producer; host of Sawbones and Still Buffering
- Breece D'J Pancake, short fiction writer; short stories published by The Atlantic Monthly
- Don Pendleton, artist and designer; widely recognized for the large body of skateboard graphics and for the artwork of Pearl Jam's album Lightning Bolt
- Rob Redding, podcaster, journalist, author and artist; former host of Redding News Review
- Cynthia Rylant, author of children's books; Missing May won the 1993 Newbery Medal; A Fine White Dust was a 1987 Newbery Honor book

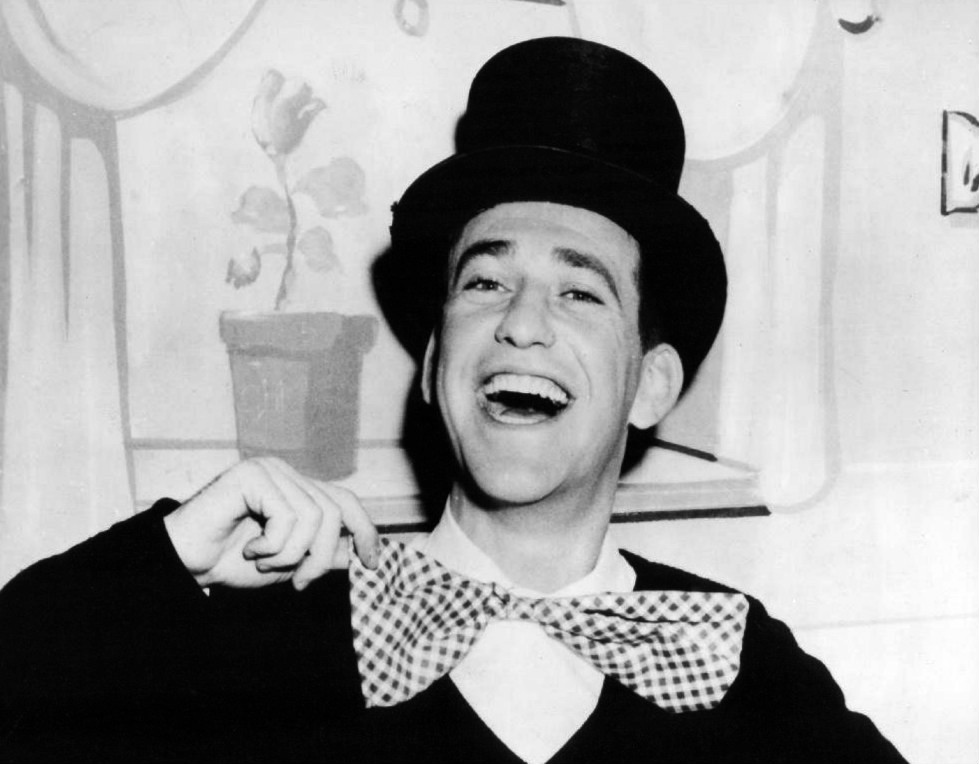
Soupy Sales

- Soupy Sales, a national TV star of the 1950s and 1960s, known for his local and network children's television series, Lunch with Soupy Sales (later titled The Soupy Sales Show) (1953–1966), a series of comedy sketches frequently ending with Sales receiving a pie in the face, which became his trademark
- Beau Smith, comic book writer, best known for his work for DC Comics, Image Comics, IDW Publishing and as vice president of marketing for Eclipse Comics
- Michael W. Smith, three-time Grammy Award and multiple Dove Award winner who has charted in both contemporary Christian and mainstream charts; his biggest success in mainstream music was in 1991 when "Place in This World" hit No. 6 on the Billboard Hot 100; has sold more than 18 million albums
- Jim Thornton, former Wheel of Fortune announcer, fired in 2026

=== Athletics ===
==== Baseball ====
- Jimmy Adair, former MLB shortstop, Chicago Cubs
- Aaron Blair, former MLB pitcher, Atlanta Braves
- Wilbur Fisher, former MLB pinch hitter, Pittsburgh Pirates
- Johnson Fry, former MLB pitcher, Cleveland Indians
- Joe Goddard, former MLB catcher, San Diego Padres
- J. D. Hammer, MLB pitcher currently with the Colorado Rockies organization

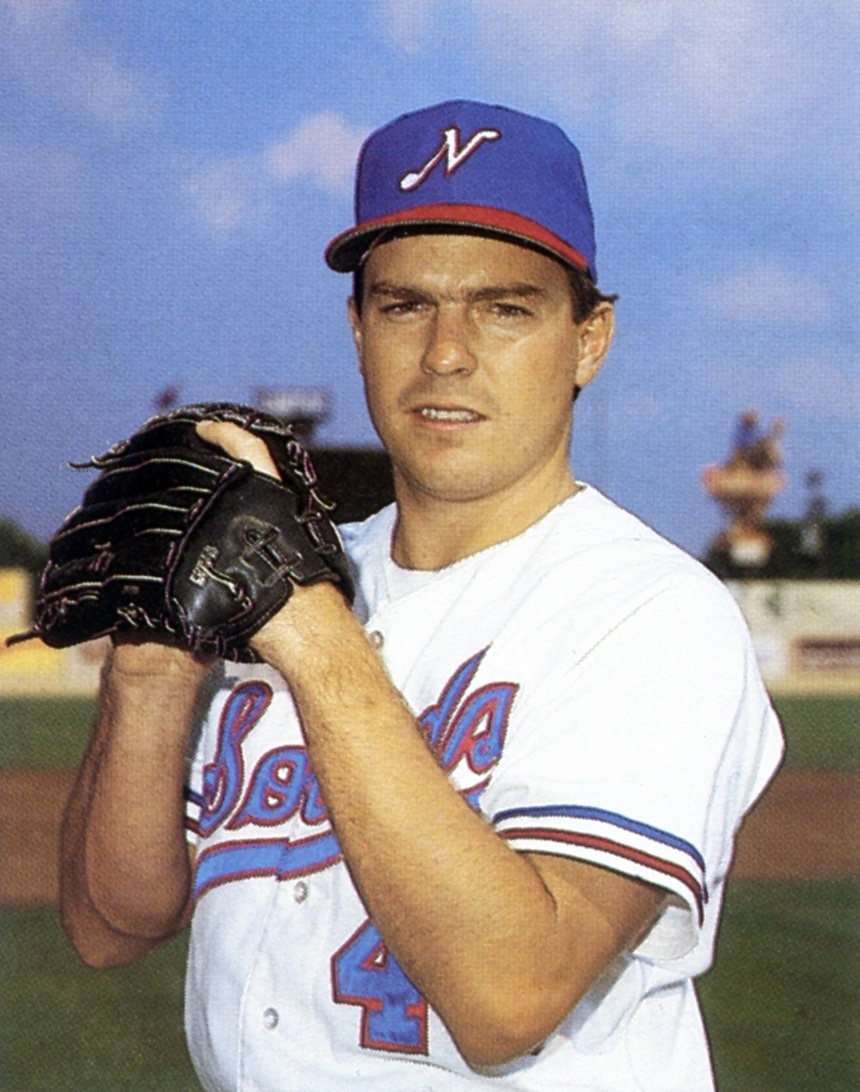
Jeff Montgomery

- Jeff Montgomery, former three-time All-Star closer, Cincinnati Reds and Kansas City Royals, KC Hall of Fame member, with over 300 saves, Marshall University Athletic Hall of Fame; led Herd to 1981 Southern Conference Championship, last conference title won by program, and tied MU record with four shutouts as freshman pitcher
- David Perno, former head baseball coach at the University of Georgia
- Rick Reed, former MLB starting pitcher Cincinnati Reds, Pittsburgh Pirates, New York Mets and Minnesota Twins, MU assistant coach for baseball in 2005; pitched in World Series, 2000 for Mets, winning one games against the New York Yankees, also pitched for Huntington (WV) High School
- Arch Reilly, former third baseman for the Pittsburgh Pirates, and Marshall head football coach
- Kevin Shackelford, former MLB pitcher, Cincinnati Reds
- Brandyn Sittinger, former MLB pitcher, Arizona Diamondbacks
- Jim Spotts, former MLB catcher, Philadelphia Phillies

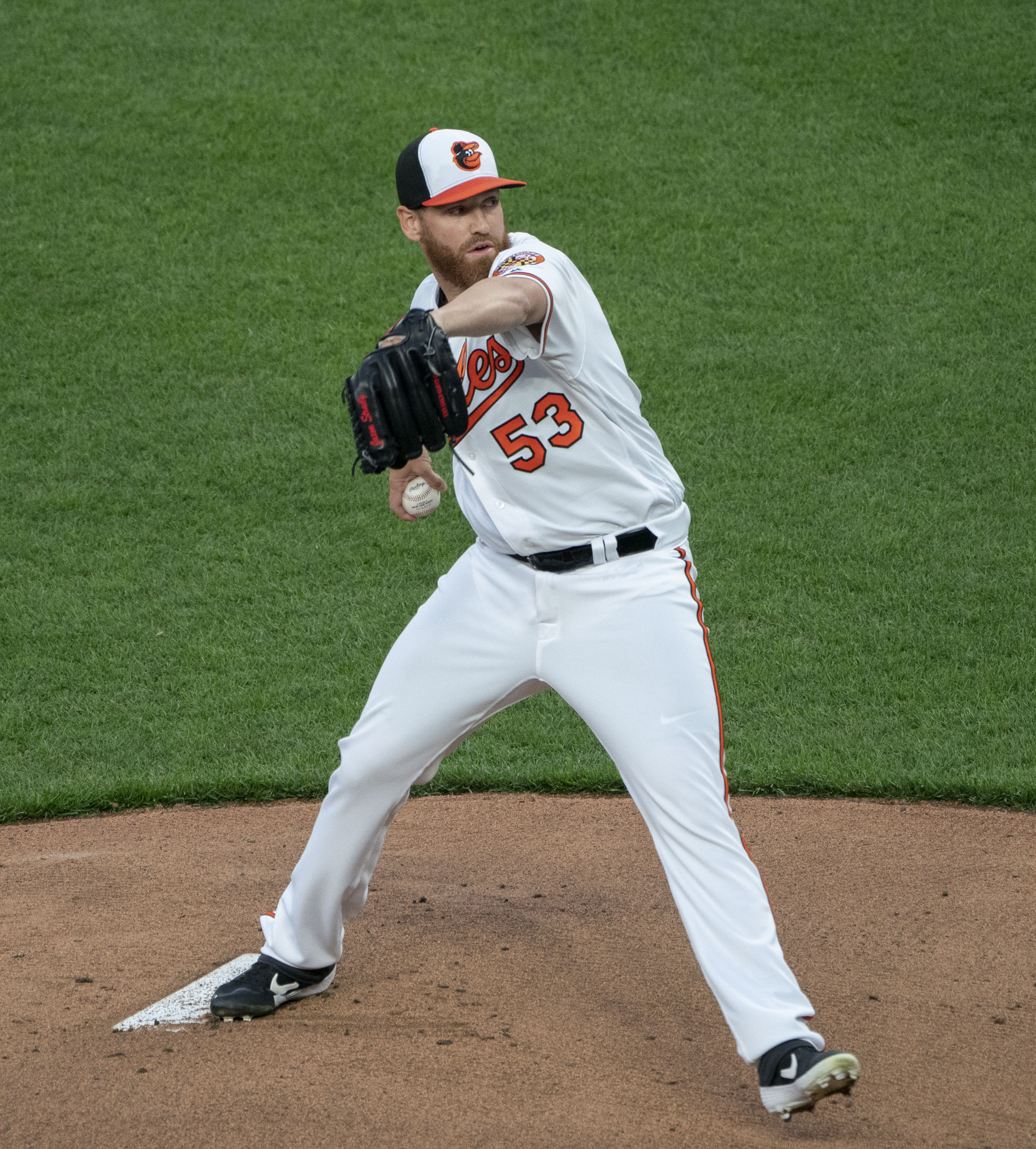
Dan Straily

- Dan Straily, relief pitcher, Oakland Athletics, 2012–14; Chicago Cubs, 2014; Houston Astros, 2015; Cincinnati Reds, 2016; Miami Marlins, 2017; former Marshall pitcher, member of 2008 Conference USA finalists in 2008 for Thundering Herd team that finished 30-30-1, most wins in school history, stood until 2016 team finished 34-21
- Chub Watson, former collegiate baseball player for Marshall University
- Bill Wilson, former MLB pitcher, Philadelphia Phillies
- Harry Young, former head coach for William & Mary Tribe baseball

==== Basketball ====
- Bob Allen, former basketball player for San Francisco Warriors
- Sonny Allen, former head coach of the Sacramento Monarchs, Santa Barbara Islanders and the Las Vegas Silver Streaks
- Ardo Ärmpalu, former basketball player for BC Kalev
- Ronald Blackshear, former basketball player for the Huntsville Flight and the Tulsa 66ers
- John Brannen, program analyst and senior special assistant for the Dayton Flyers men's basketball
- Stevie Browning, basketball player for the Ovarense Basquetebol
- Leo Byrd, former basketball player for the Cincinnati Royals

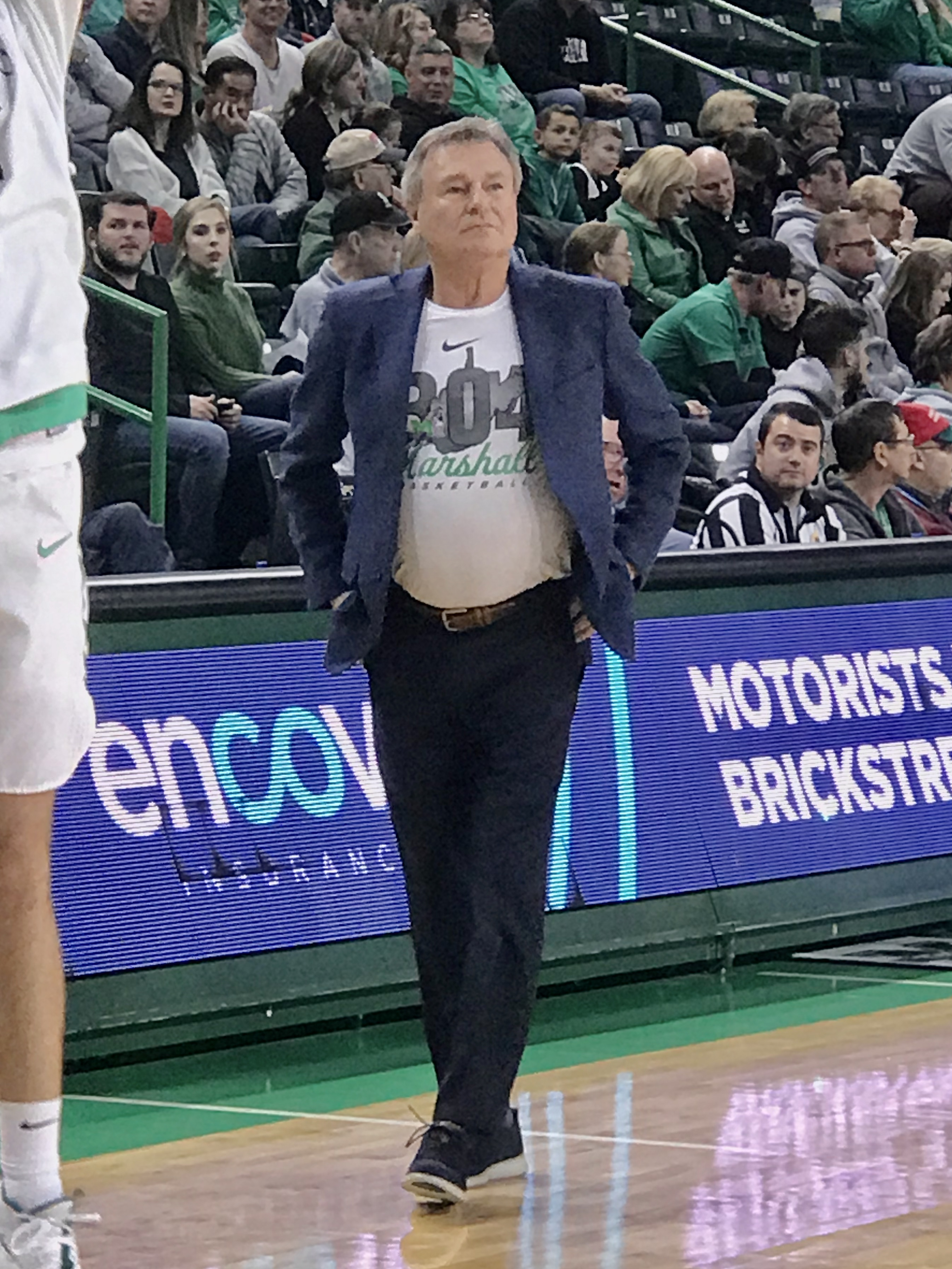
Dan D'Antoni

- Dan D'Antoni, head coach Marshall University since 2014; previously professional NBA assistant coach, with Los Angeles Lakers, New York Knicks and Phoenix Suns; member of Marshall University Athletic Hall of Fame; as point guard led Herd to back-to-back NIT appearances in 1967 and 1968, advancing to "Final Four" with wins over Villanova and Nebraska in 1967, losing in 2OT to St. Peter's (102-93); coached Socastee High School at Myrtle Beach, S.C. to over 500 wins, created Beach Ball Classic Tournament with both basketball and scholar competitions

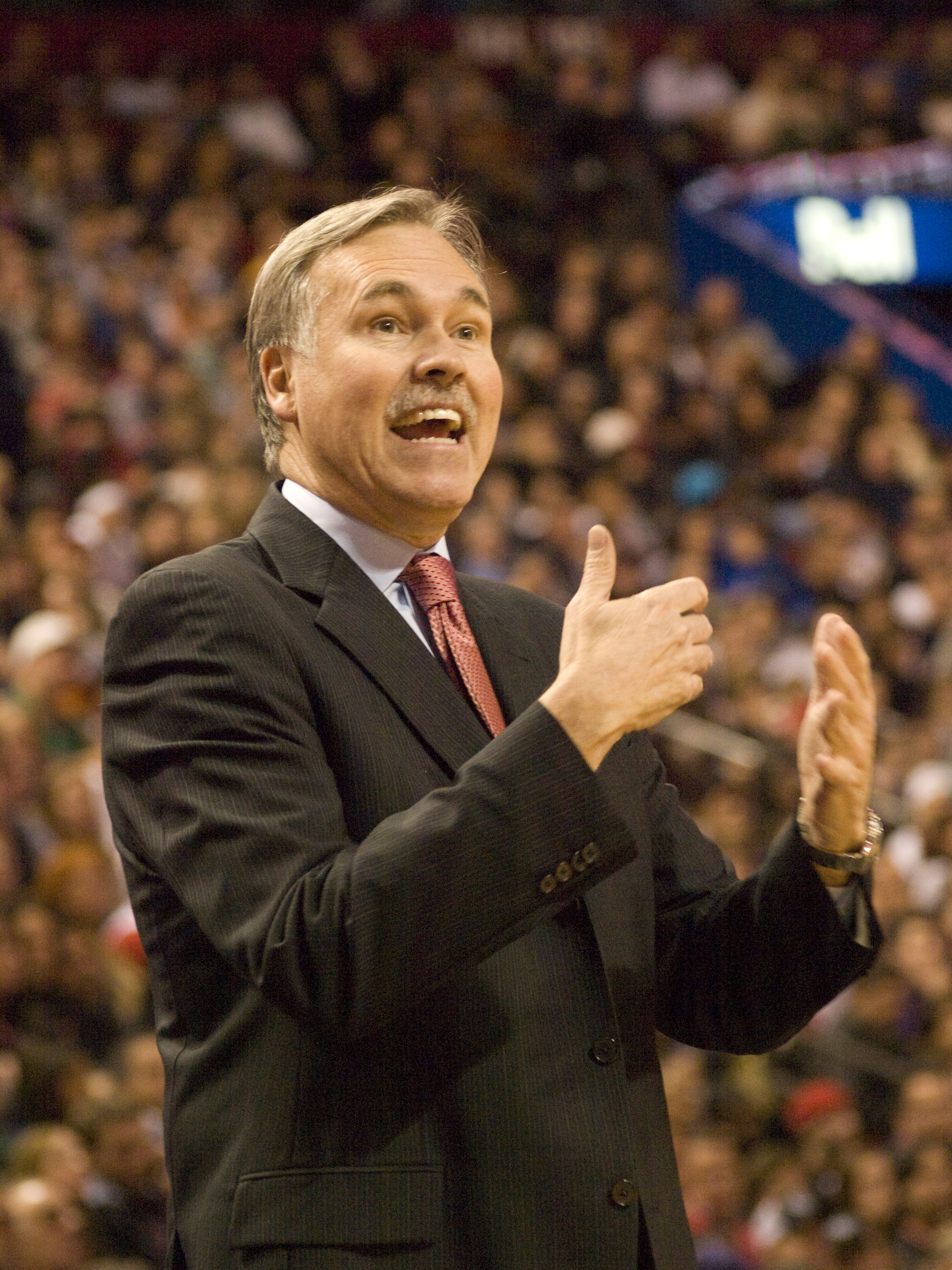
Mike D'Antoni

- Mike D'Antoni, current head coach of Houston Rockets, previously head coach of Los Angeles Lakers, New York Knicks, Phoenix Suns, Denver Nuggets and in the Italian League for many years; former player, NBA Kansas City Royals, and Italian League; 50 Greatest Euroleague Contributors (1998); Marshall University Athletic Hall of Fame for leading Herd to NCAA Tournament in 1972 (23-4, No. 12 in the nation in Associated Press poll and No. 18 in UPI poll, reached as high as No. 8 in the nation in AP); and to NIT in 1973 (20-7), losing to Fairfield (80-76)
- Jon Elmore, basketball player for the Sioux Falls Skyforce
- Brian Fish, former head coach of the Montana State Bobcats men's basketball and executive director for the Oregon Ducks men's basketball

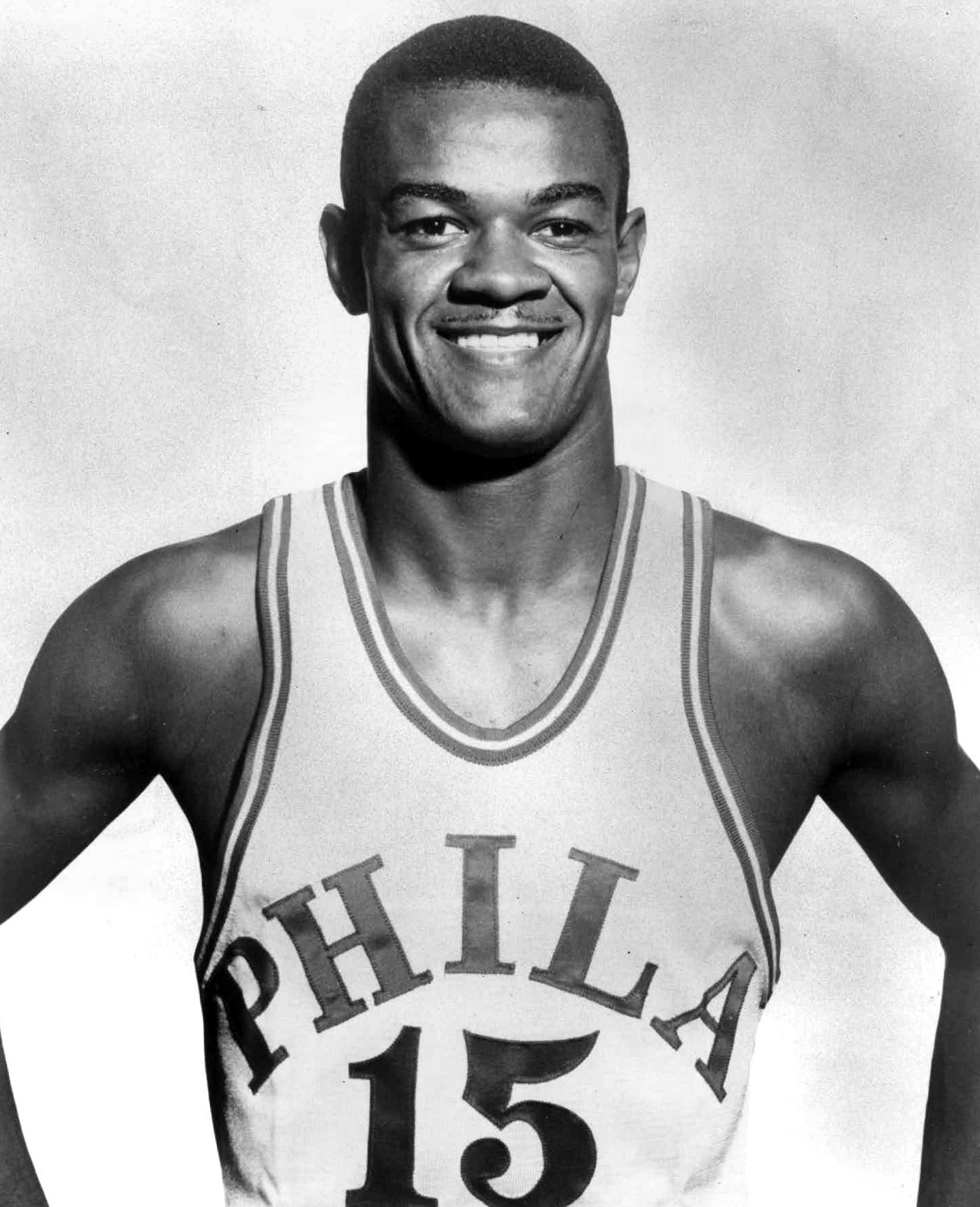
Hal Greer

- Hal Greer, Naismith Basketball Hall of Fame (inducted 1982), Springfield, Mass.; 50 Greatest Players in NBA History (1996); Philadelphia 76ers and Syracuse Nationals; Marshall University Athletic Hall of Fame; WV Sportswriters Hall of Fame; won NBA Title in 1967, was MVP of All-Star Game in 1968
- A. W. Hamilton, head coach of Eastern Kentucky Colonels men's basketball
- Chantelle Handy, basketball player for the Great Britain women's national basketball team in the 2012 Summer Olympics
- Skip Henderson, former Southern Conference Men's Basketball Player of the Year
- Markel Humphrey, basketball player for the BBC Monthey-Chablais
- Billy James, former basketball player for the Kentucky Colonels
- Gene James, former basketball player for the New York Knicks and the Baltimore Bullets
- DeAndre Kane, basketball player in the Israeli Premier League and EuroLeague
- Kevin Keatts, current men's head coach NC State Wolfpack
- James Kelly (born 1993), basketball player in the Israel Basketball Premier League
- Jerry Kelly, former NBA basketball player
- Taevion Kinsey, basketball player for the Utah Jazz; current all-time leading scorer in Marshall men's basketball history
- Ken Labanowski (born 1959), American-Israeli basketball player in the Israel Basketball Premier League
- Russ Lee, former basketball player for the Milwaukee Bucks and the New Orleans Jazz
- Chris Lutz, former basketball player for the San Miguel Beermen
- Yous Mbao, former basketball player for the CB Gran Canaria
- Bucky McConnell, former NBA basketball player
- Charlie Slack, former NBA small forward, Detroit Pistons
- Tamar Slay, former NBA shooting guard, New Jersey Nets
- Andy Tonkovich, former BAA point guard, Providence Steamrollers

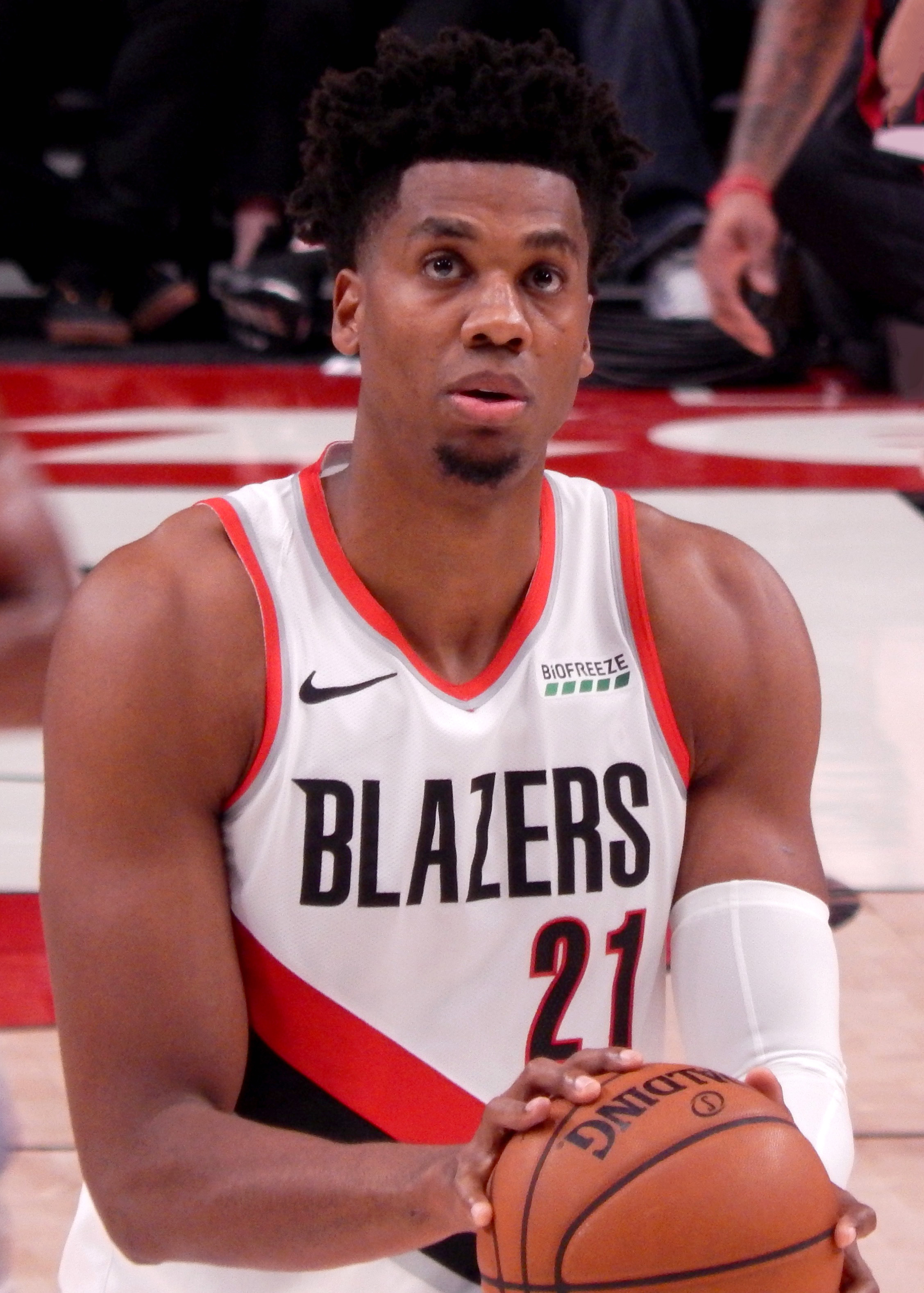
Hassan Whiteside

- Walt Walowac, former NIBL basketball player
- Hassan Whiteside, professional basketball, NBA Sacramento Kings, 2010–11, Miami Heat 2014–19, Portland Trail Blazers since 2019; drafted in the second round of 2010 Draft; NBADL Reno Bighorns, 2011–12, and Sioux Falls Skyforce, 2012–13; played just one year at Marshall, but set game (13), season and career (182) block records for Marshall, 2009–10, for Coach Donnie Jones, and helped Herd to CIT berth, first post-season for MU since 1988, earning Freshman All-American honors from The Sporting News
- Tyler Wilkerson, professional basketball, Israel, 2011–12; NBADL, Austin Toros. 2012–13; finished with 657 rebounds (16th all-time) and 1,038 points (38th all-time) at Marshall University, and helped Herd to back-to-back CIT berths, the Herd's first post-season action since 1988
- Jason Williams, former NBA basketball player

==== Football ====
- Micah Abraham, current NFL cornerback for the Indianapolis Colts
- Bob Adkins, former NFL quarterback for the Green Bay Packers
- Greg Adkins, NCAA assistant coach-offensive line at Oklahoma State; formerly NFL assistant coach-tight ends, Buffalo Bills, 2013; college assistant-tight ends, Syracuse University; captain and starting tackle for Thundering Herd; started career at Marshall; also coached at University of Georgia

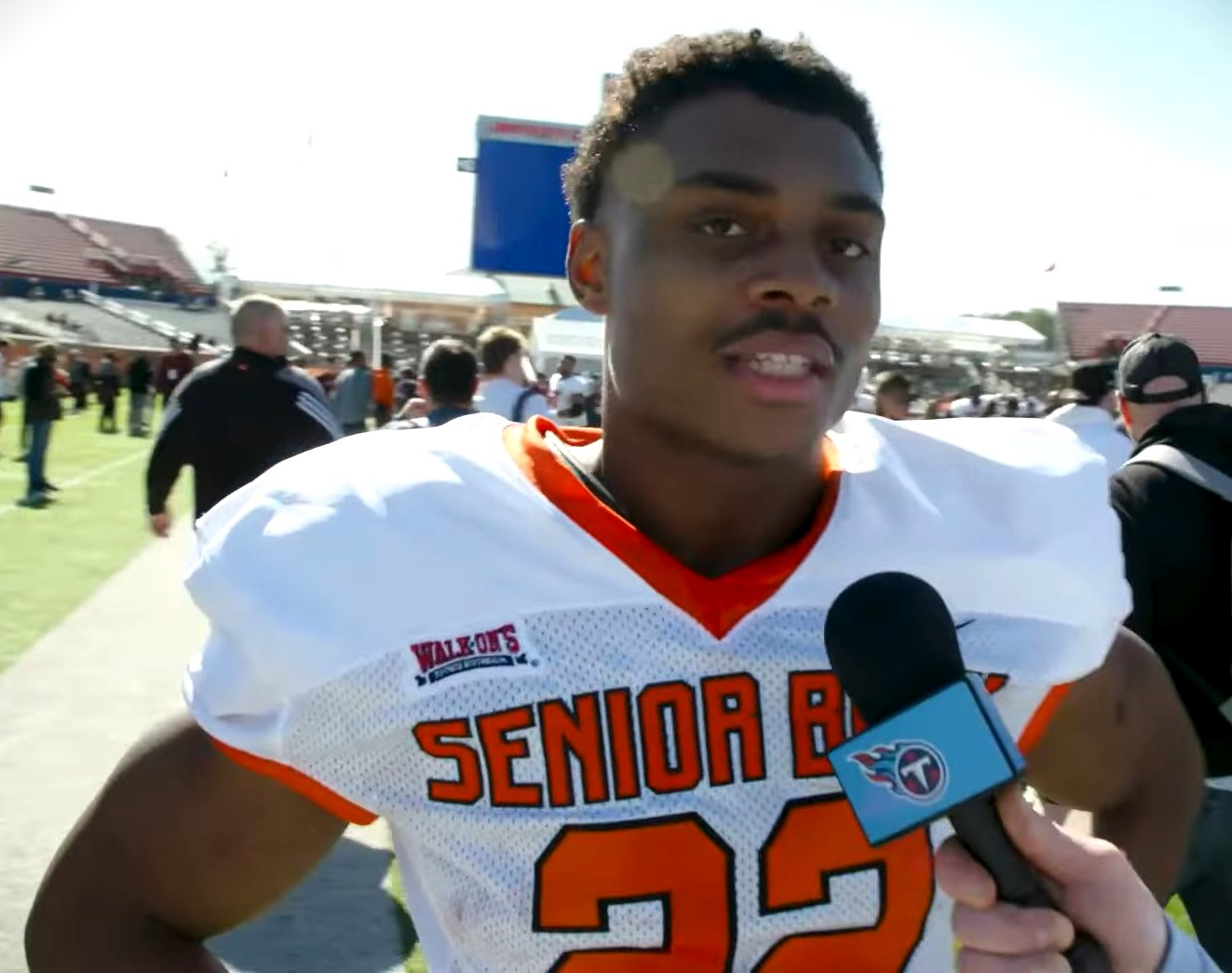
Rasheen Ali

- Rasheen Ali, current running back for the Baltimore Ravens
- Kevin Anderson, current quarterback for the Orlando Apollos of the Alliance of American Football (AAF), the Winnipeg Blue Bombers and Ottawa Redblacks of the Canadian Football League (CFL), and the Arlington Renegades of the XFL; member of The Spring League's (TSL) 2021 season, where he led the Conquerors to finish as North Division runner-ups
- Daniel Baldridge, former offensive tackle for the Jacksonville Jaguars
- Josh Ball, current former guard for the Dallas Cowboys
- Michael Barber, former NFL wide receiver, Super Bowl XXIV champion, inducted into the College Football Hall of Fame in 2005, inducted into the West Virginia Sports Hall of Fame in 2020
- George Barlow, college football assistant coach at South Florida since 2021, Vanderbilt University, 2012–13; previously assistant coach and interim head coach at New Mexico; played defensive back for Thundering Herd, 1987–90
- Jim Barton, former center for the Dallas Texans

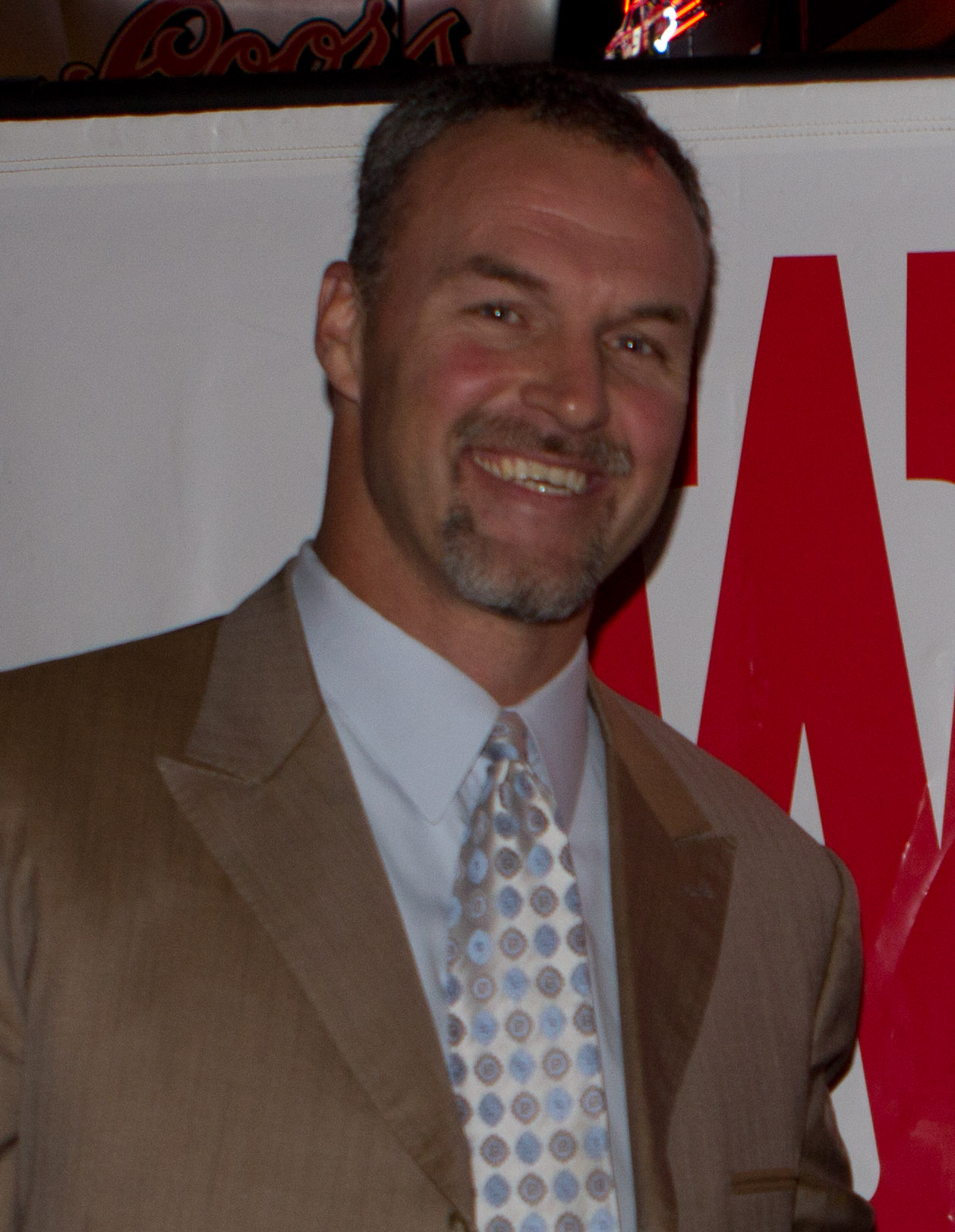
Mike Bartrum

- Mike Bartrum, Pro Bowl long snapper, Philadelphia Eagles, New England Patriots, Green Bay Packers and Kansas City Chiefs, retired 2007, Marshall University Athletic Hall of Fame; became head coach Meigs (Ohio) High School in 2012 (where he played in high school) and Country Commissioner for Meigs Co.
- Alex Bazzie, CFL player for British Columbia Lions 2014-17; signed contract with Indianapolis Colts as reserve/future player, possible move to NFL
- Rogers Beckett, former NFL safety, played for the San Diego Chargers and the Cincinnati Bengals; standout safety for Thundering Herd football

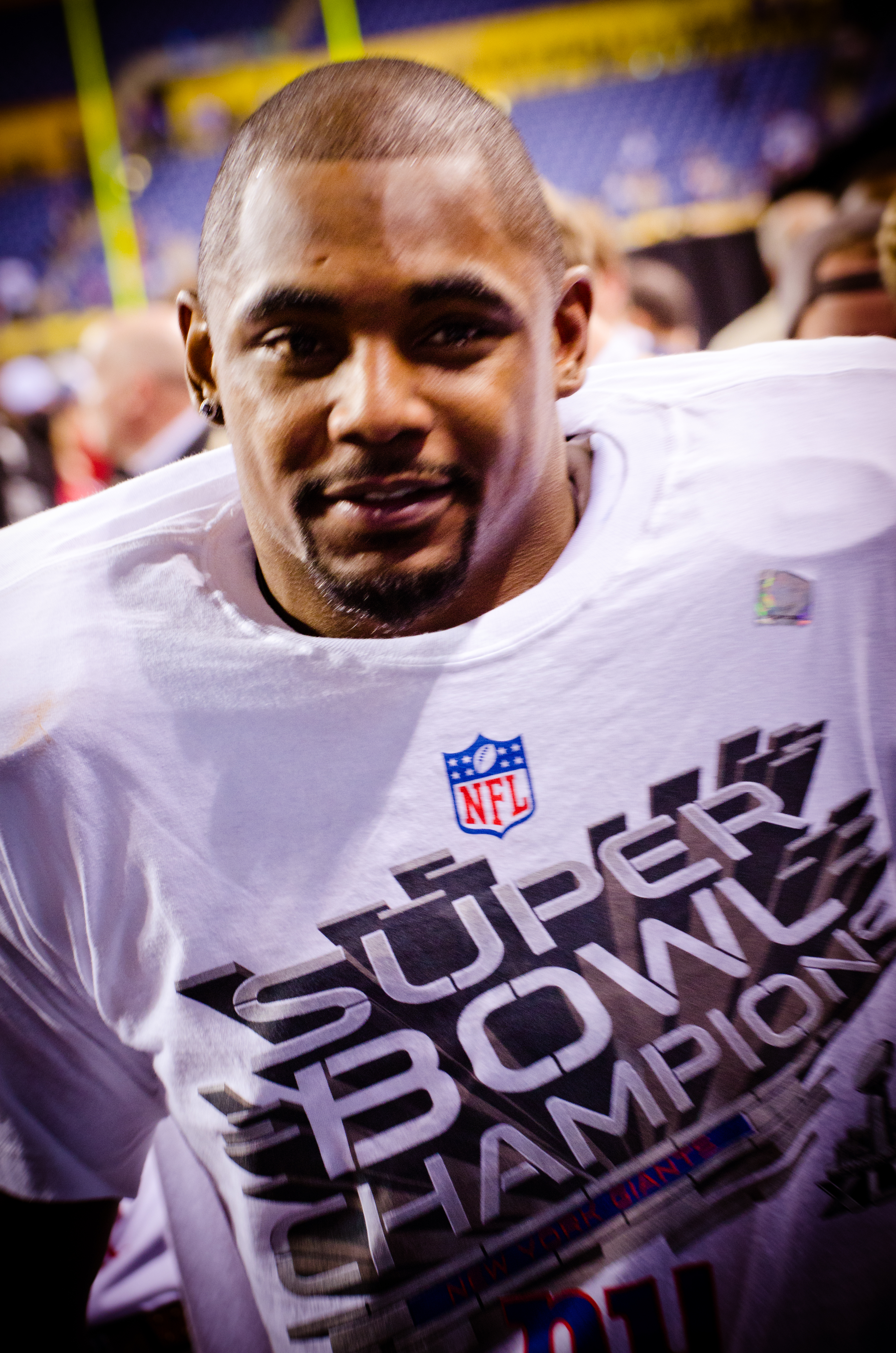
Ahmad Bradshaw

- Ahmad Bradshaw, NFL running back, New York Giants, Super Bowl champs for 2007 and 2011, cut in winter of 2013 and free agent, due to salary cap restrictions on Giants, also surgery on ankle this off-season; picked up by the Indianapolis Colts in the offseason of 2013–2015, retired
- Omar Brown, NFL safety, 2012-14 Baltimore Ravens, Super Bowl Champion
- Troy Brown, former Pro Bowl receiver/punt returner, New England Patriots, three Super Bowl championships and two runners-up, Marshall Hall of Fame and member of Comcast-New England, covering Pats football
- Rakeem Cato, quarterback for the Kansas City Goats of The Arena League; former Montreal Alouettes of the Canadian Football League (CFL), Richmond Roughriders of the American Arena League (AAL), Gulf Coast Fire of the A-League, Orlando Predators of the National Arena League (NAL), and the Iowa Rampage of the Arena Football League
- Larry Coyer, former NFL assistant coach, Tampa Bay Buccaneers and Denver Broncos, Marshall Hall of Fame
- Chris Crocker, NFL safety, Miami Dolphins, Atlanta Falcons, Cleveland Browns and Cincinnati Bengals
- Vinny Curry, NFL defensive end, Philadelphia Eagles, Super Bowl LII Champion and former C-USA Defensive Player of the Year (2011); namesake of Marshall football locker rooms

Frank Gatski

- Frank Gatski, Pro Football Hall of Fame (inducted 1985), Canton, Ohio; Center/linebacker for Cleveland Browns 1946–56, Detroit Lions 1957; won eight championships in 11 title games over 12 seasons in the NFL and AAFC, most ever by any position (non-kicker) player; Marshall Hall of Fame; West Virginia Sportswriters Hall of Fame
- Mike Green, 2024 Sun Belt Player of the Year with the latter after leading all FBS players with 17 sacks. Selected by the Baltimore Ravens in the second round of the 2025 NFL draft
- Chris Hanson, former NFL punter, New England Patriots, New Orleans Saints and Jacksonville Jaguars
- Mario Harvey, former NFL linebacker for the Indianapolis Colts
- Ramey Hunter, former NFL player for the Portsmouth Spartans
- Carl Lee, former Pro Bowl defensive back, Minnesota Vikings and New Orleans Saints, Marshall Hall of Fame, Vikings 50th Anniversary team and former head coach of West Virginia State University Yellow Jacket football

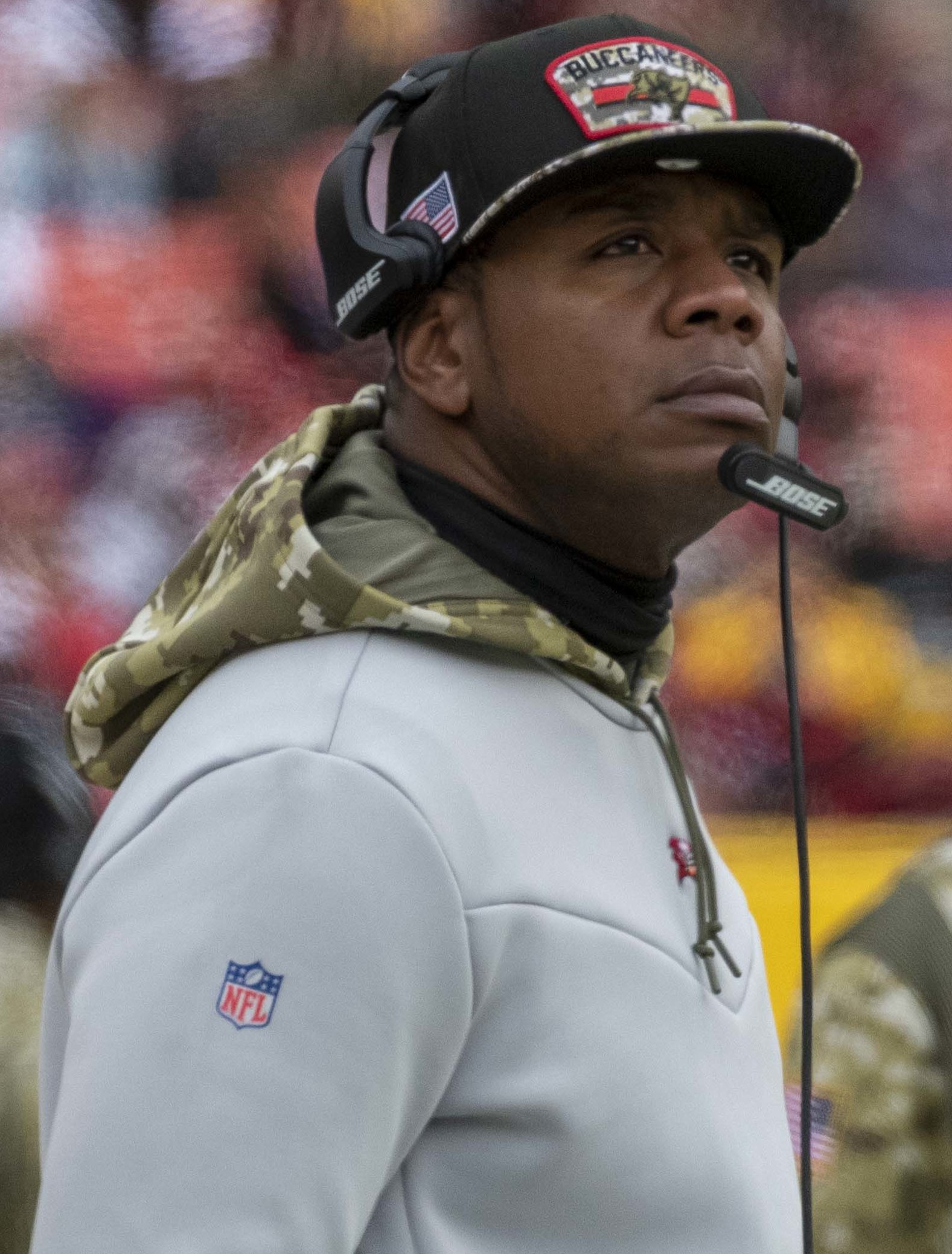
Byron Leftwich

- Byron Leftwich, NFL quarterback, Jacksonville Jaguars (drafted first round, selection #7, highest in Marshall history) and Atlanta Falcons, currently with the Pittsburgh Steelers 2008–2012; member of Marshall Hall of Fame; led Herd to Motor City Bowl win in 2000 over University of Cincinnati, to GMAC Bowl win over East Carolina University 64-61 in 2OTs in 2001 and another GMAC Bowl win in 2002 over University of Louisville, 38-15; won Mid-American Conference titles in 2000 and 2002
- Doug Legursky, former NFL center/guard, Pittsburgh Steelers, team captain for Thundering Herd as three-year starter at center
- Mike Maser, former NFL offensive line coach for the Miami Dolphins, Jacksonville Jaguars and Carolina Panthers
- Chris Massey, former NFL long snapper/fullback, St. Louis Rams, Chicago Bears and Carolina Panthers; as a player for Herd, helped Herd to numerous conference titles and bowl wins; misfired on only one snap in college and NFL career
- Albert McClellan, NFL linebacker, Baltimore Ravens 2010–12, won Super Bowl championship 2012, New England Patriots and New York Jets; Conference USA Defensive Player of Year in 2007, led Herd to win in 2009 Little Caesars Pizza Bowl over Ohio University, 21-17

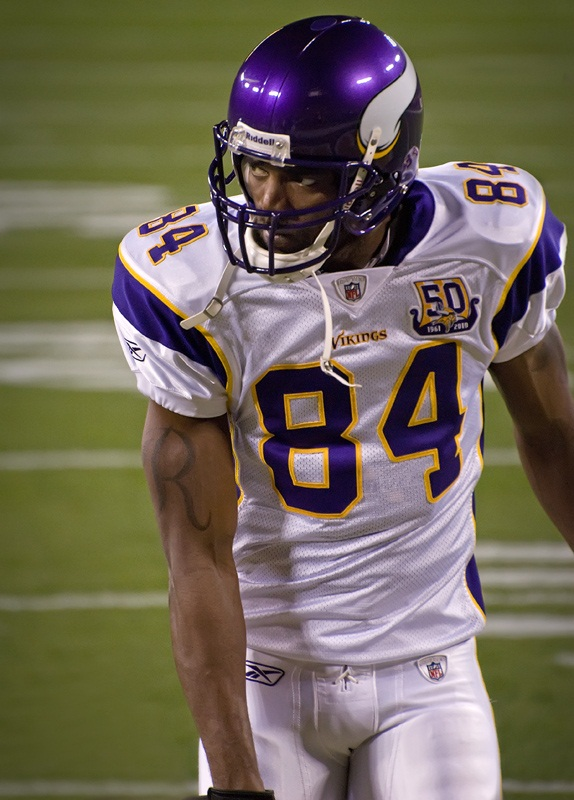
Randy Moss

- Randy Moss, Pro Football Hall of Fame Class of 2018, five-time Pro Bowl receiver; holds the single-season record for receiving touchdowns by a rookie with 17; holds the single-season record for receiving touchdowns with 23; second all-time in receiving TD's with 156, trailing only Jerry Rice; Minnesota Vikings (1998 first round, #21 pick), Oakland Raiders, New England Patriots, Tennessee Titans and San Francisco 49ers
- Okechukwu Okoroha, former Arena Football League football player
- Chris Parker, former NFL player

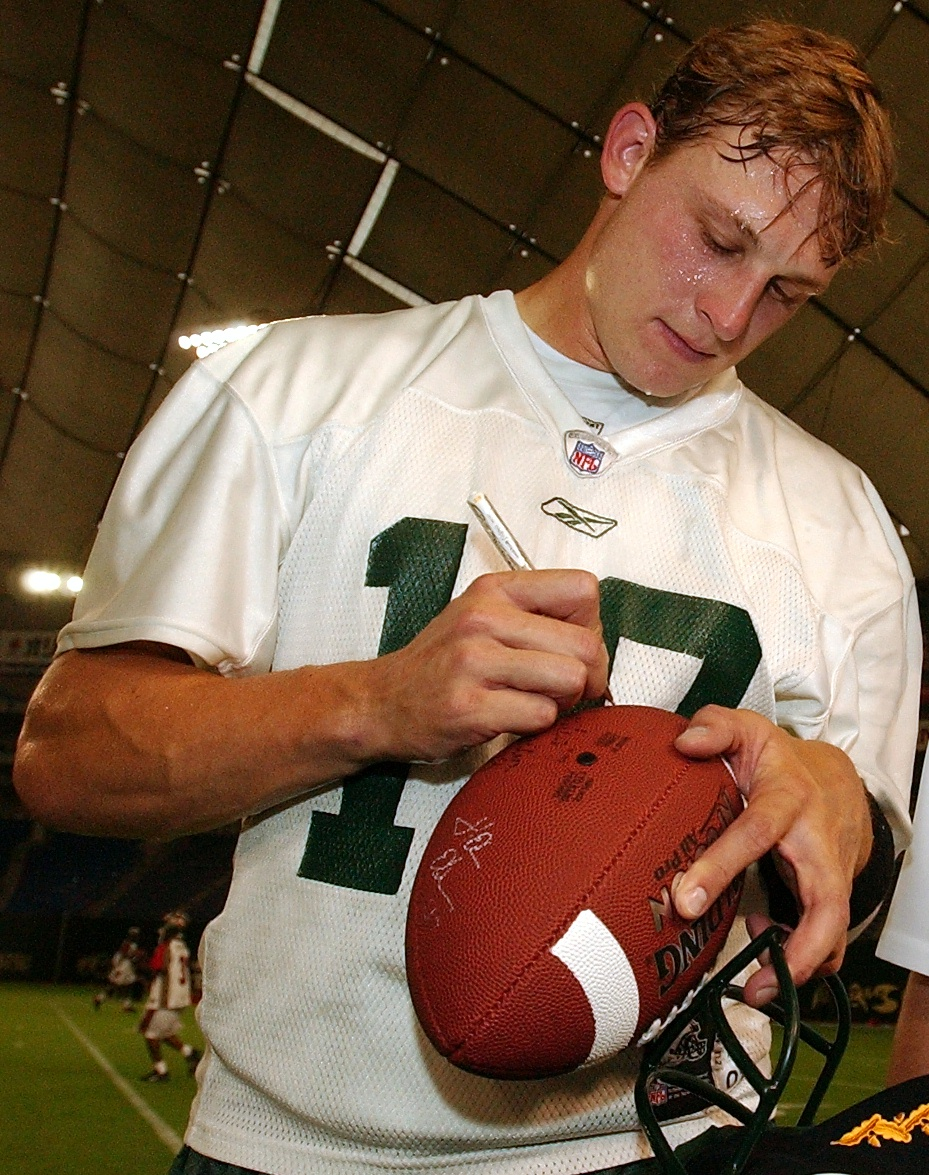
Chad Pennington

- Chad Pennington, former NFL quarterback, Miami Dolphins and New York Jets, 2000–2010 (first round, #12 pick); FOX NFL analyst, 2012; Marshall Hall of Fame; led 1995 Herd to I-AA finals as true frosh; then led MU to Mid-American Conference titles in 1997-98-99, Motor City Bowls in 1997-98-99, to No. 25 ranking (The Sporting News) in 1998 with 12-1 mark, then to No. 10 rankings in Associated Press, USA Today and The Sporting News final polls for I-A football with 13-0 mark in 1999, knocking off No. 25 BYU in MCB III
- Tony Petersen, college football coach-offensive coordinator, Louisiana Tech, 2013; co-offensive coordinator, qb coach and assoc. head coach, Marshall University, 2010–12; also coached at Marshall, 1991–2000; Marshall Hall of Fame; quarterbacked Herd to I-AA National Finals for the first time, falling to University of Louisiana-Monroe, 43-42, in championship game in a school-record 10-win season in 1987, then saved three games (setting MU record) in 1988, winning Southern Conference Athlete of the Year honors
- Bob Pruett, former defensive coordinator, University of Virginia and former head coach, Marshall University, 1996–2004, lettered nine times in three sports at Marshall 1961–64 (football, track and wrestling); member of Marshall Hall of Fame
- Jason Rader, former NFL tight end, Miami Dolphins, Tennessee Titans and New England Patriots
- J.J. Roberts, NFL safety
- Steve Sciullo, former NFL offensive lineman, Indianapolis Colts and Philadelphia Eagles
- Lee Smith, NFL tight end, Buffalo Bills, 2012; New England Patriots, 2011–12
- Mark Snyder, college assistant coach-defensive coordinator, Texas A&M, 2012–13; defensive coordinator, USF Bulls, 2010–12; head coach, Marshall University, 2005–2009; defensive coordinator, Ohio State University, 1999–2005; defensive coordinator, Youngstown State University

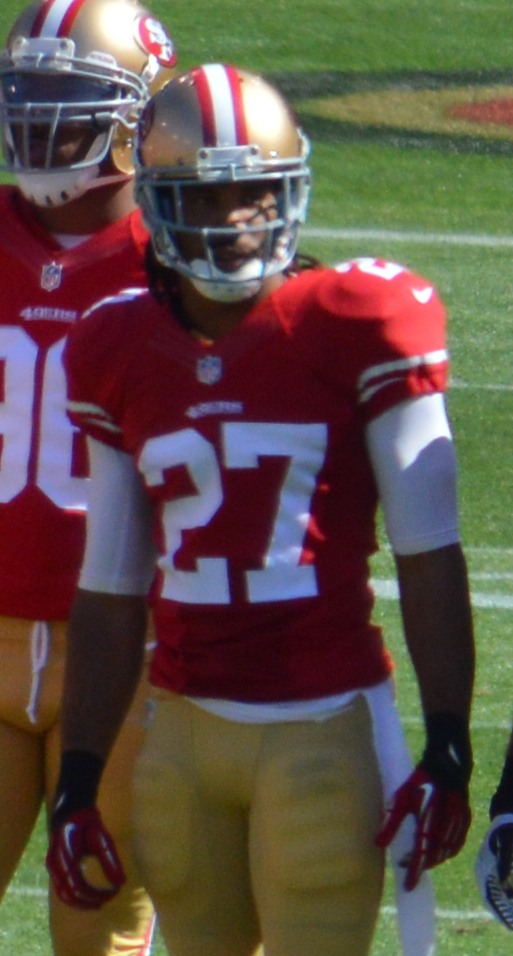
C. J. Spillman

- C.J. Spillman, NFL safety, San Diego Chargers and San Francisco 49ers, played in Super Bowl XLVII, losing to Baltimore Ravens
- Press Taylor, current offensive coordinator for the Jacksonville Jaguars
- Ed Ulinski, former NFL All-Pro linebacker, Cleveland Browns
- Wayne Underwood, former NFL All-Pro offensive tackle, Cleveland Rams
- John Wade, former NFL center, Oakland Raiders, Jacksonville Jaguars and Tampa Bay Buccaneers
- Darius Watts, former wide receiver, Philadelphia Soul, Arena Football League, 2008; New York Giants and Denver Broncos
- Norm Willey, former NFL Pro Bowl defensive end, Philadelphia Eagles
- Jamie Wilson, former offensive tackle, Carolina Panthers and Indianapolis Colts
- Bill Winter, former linebacker/guard/placekicker, Charleston Rockets
- Jason Witczak, former placekicker, Tennessee Titans and Buffalo Bills
- Max Yates, former linebacker, Minnesota Vikings and San Francisco 49ers

==== Soccer ====
- Matthew Bell, soccer player for Real Salt Lake
- Travis Brent, head men's soccer coach at Franklin Pierce University
- Vitor Dias, soccer player for HFX Wanderers
- Pedro Dolabella, soccer player for Union Omaha in USL League One
- Nathan Dossantos, soccer player for Pittsburgh Riverhounds in the USL Championship
- Morris Duggan, soccer player for Minnesota United FC

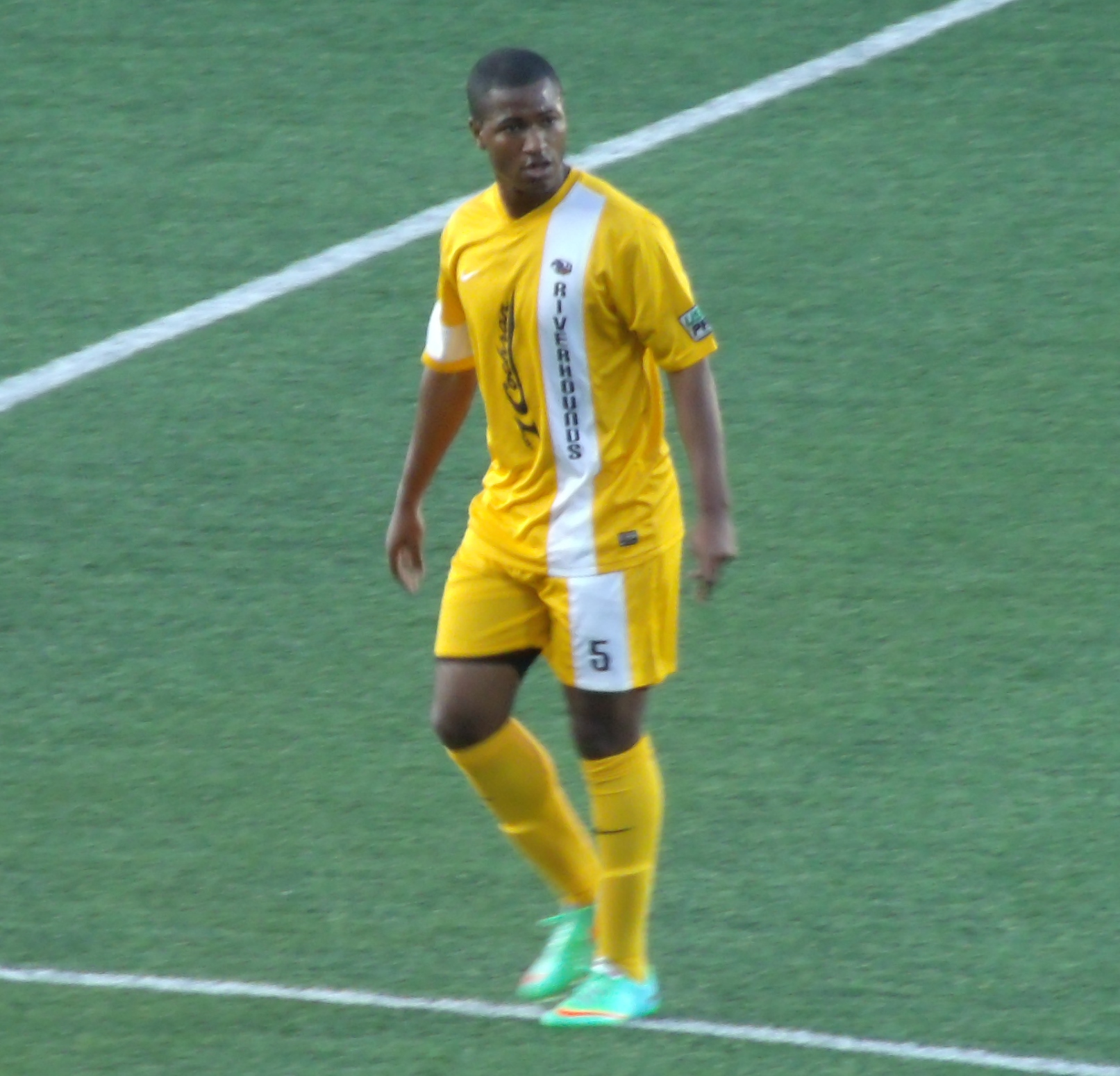
Sterling Flunder

- Sterling Flunder, former soccer player who last played for Pittsburgh Riverhounds in the USL
- Kat González, soccer player for Dominican Republic women's national football team
- Rimario Gordon, soccer player for Becamex Bình Dương in V.League 1
- Freya Holdaway, former soccer player for Northern Ireland women's national football team
- Daniel Jodah, soccer player for Sigma FC in League1 Ontario
- Kolby LaCrone, former USL soccer player
- Jan-Erik Leinhos, soccer player for One Knoxville SC in USL League One
- Collin Mocyunas, soccer player for Tormenta FC in USL League One
- Illal Osumanu, soccer player for Pittsburgh Riverhounds in USL Championship
- Paulo Pita, Academy soccer player for Sporting Kansas City
- Eddy Prugh, former USL soccer player
- Jamil Roberts, soccer player for Peninsula Power FC in National Premier Leagues Queensland
- Dan Rose, soccer player for Marshall University
- Max Schneider, soccer player for St. Louis City SC 2 in MLS Next Pro
- Oliver Semmle, soccer player for Louisville City in the USL Championship
- Avneet Shergill, former soccer player for Ajax Orlando Prospects, West Virginia Chaos and the Portland Timbers U23s in USL
- Milo Yosef, for FC Tulsa in USL

==== Other ====
- Kelly-Anne Billingy, former Trinidad and Tobago women's national volleyball team player
- Tammie Green, LPGA golfer

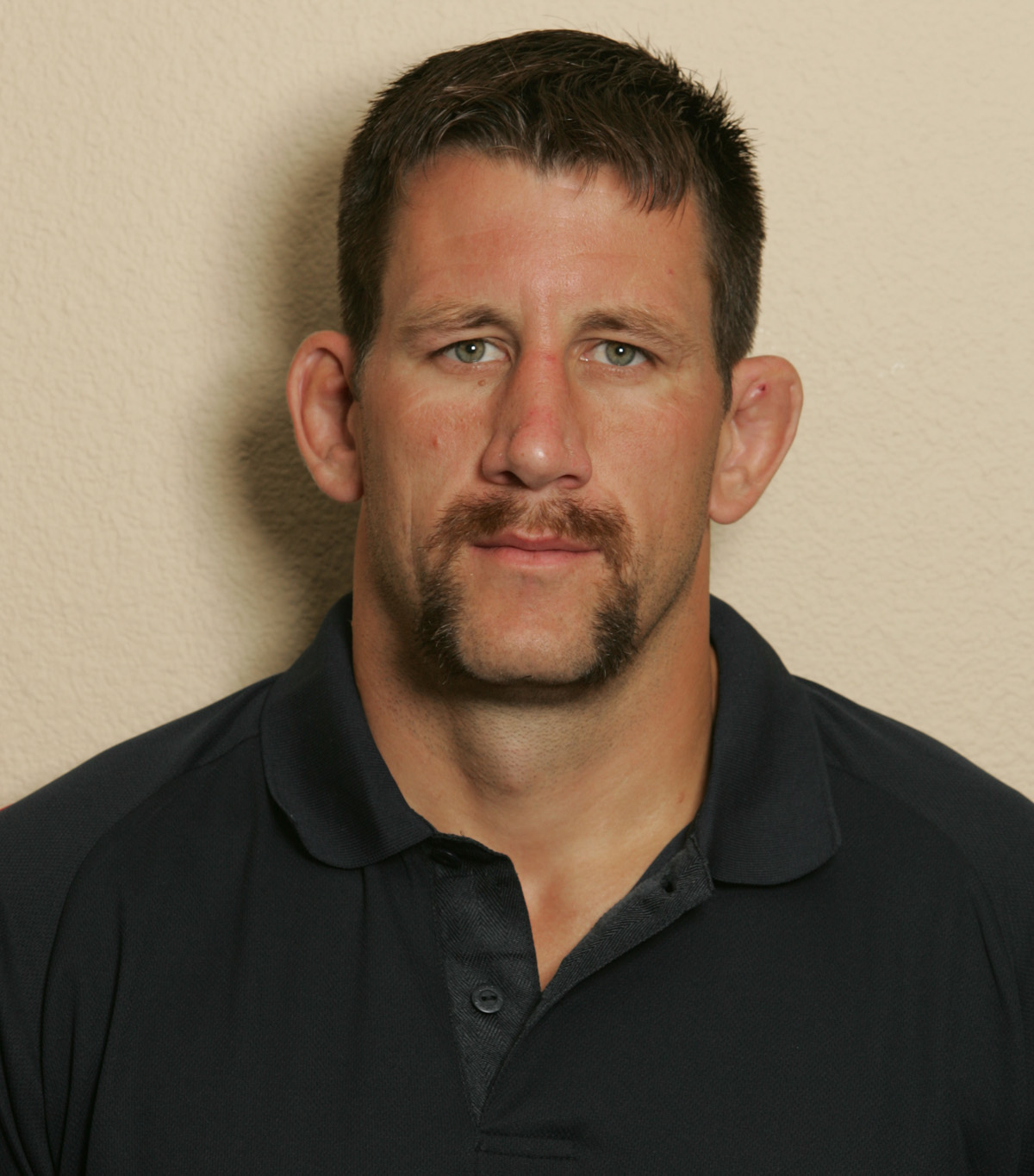
Luke Gross

- Luke Gross, all-time scoring leader caps leader for the US national rugby union team; Gross played basketball at Marshall, 1991–93
- Mike Hamrick, former athletic director of Marshall University, UNLV Rebels, East Carolina Pirates and UALR Trojans
- Dustin Hazelett, professional mixed martial artist, formerly with the UFC
- Lea Ann Parsley, Olympic silver medalist (Skeleton), 2002 Salt Lake City Games, Marshall Hall of Fame (track & field and basketball); lettered four times in basketball and track each as student-athlete
- Sirena Rowe, former Federación Colombiana de Natación swimmer

=== Business ===
- Don Blankenship, former chairman and CEO of Massey Energy Company
- Christopher Cline, former majority owner of Foresight Reserves LP, regarded by Bloomberg News as the "New King Coal"
- James F. Edwards, former CEO of National Mattress Company (Namaco)
- Eric George, founder and CEO of ERG Enterprises, Omega Hospital and the Hand Center of Louisiana in New Orleans
- Michael Moe Myint, founder of Myint & Associates and MPRL E&P
- Rex Repass, US-based public opinion and marketing research executive
- Brad D. Smith, former CEO of Intuit, president of Marshall University
- Jim Smith, former CEO of Thomson Reuters, director at Pfizer, Inc.

=== Education ===
- Ronald J. Allen, John Henry Wigmore Professor of Law at Northwestern University, Yangtze River Scholar award recipient
- Oscar Henry Cooper, former president of Baylor University and Hardin–Simmons University

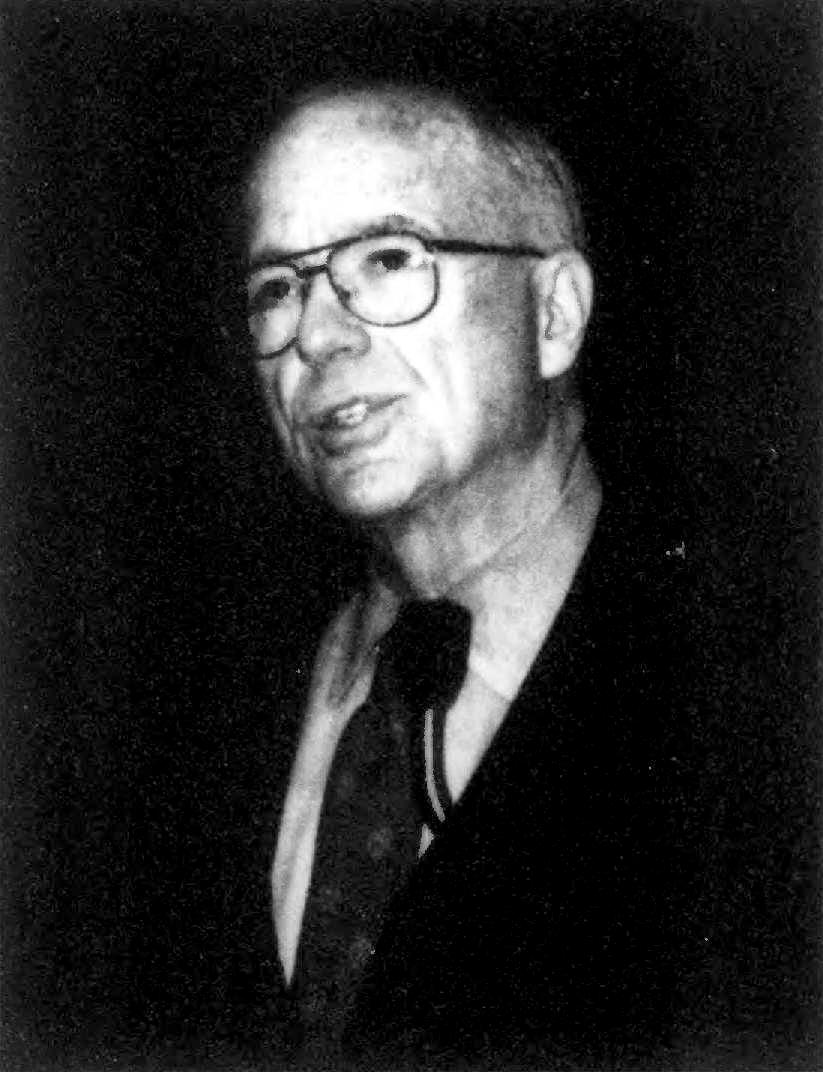
Joseph Duffey

- Joseph Duffey, former Director of the United States Information Agency, president of American University, president of University of Massachusetts, chair of the National Endowment for the Humanities and Assistant Secretary of State for Educational and Cultural Affairs
- Samuel E. Kelly, first African-American senior administrator at the University of Washington
- Fred B. Lambert, historian and West Virginia educator; notable roles in establishing Guyan Valley High School, his production of The Llorrac, and the Fred B. Lambert Collection, an assemblage of regional history housed at Marshall University
- Thomas E. Ross, former professor of geography at the University of North Carolina at Pembroke
- Wallace S. Sayre, former professor of political science at Columbia University
- Joanne Tomblin, former president of Southern West Virginia Community and Technical College, former First Lady of West Virginia
- David A. Wiley, academic writer; has published work on open content, open educational resources, and informal online learning communities has been reported in many international outlets, including The New York Times, The Hindu, MIT Technology Review, and Wired

=== Journalism ===
- Joe Johns, congressional correspondent, CNN, formerly with NBC
- Julia Keller, feature reporter and 2005 Pulitzer Prize winner, Chicago Tribune
- Gene Kelly, sportscaster, best known as the announcer for the Philadelphia Phillies during the 1950s
- Rob Redding, Internet and radio journalist and 2014 Pulitzer Prize nominee, Redding News Review
- Lisa Thomas-Laury, former news presenter for WPVI-TV

=== Military ===
- John Astle, former colonel in the US Marine Corps; received 34 air medals and two Purple Hearts
- Don Chafin, commander in the Battle of Blair Mountain
- Justice M. Chambers, former United States Marine Corps officer who received the Medal of Honor for actions in World War II during the Iwo Jima campaign
- Johnnie H. Corns, former Inspector General of the United States Army
- Anthony G. Crutchfield, former United States Army lieutenant general who was the deputy commander of United States Pacific Command
- Terry R. Ferrell, former lieutenant general in the United States Army, who last served as the commanding general of United States Army Central
- Carwood Lipton, member of Easy Company, 506th Infantry Regiment during World War II; received three Purple Hearts, and two Bronze Star medals

=== Politics ===
- Bill Anderson, current West Virginia House of Delegates (10th district)
- Troy Andes, current West Virginia House of Delegates (15th district)
- Lynne Arvon, former West Virginia House of Delegates and West Virginia Senate
- Bob Ashley, former West Virginia House of Delegates and West Virginia Senate
- John Astle, former Maryland House of Delegates and Maryland Senate
- Bill Bell (West Virginia politician), current West Virginia House of Delegates, 8th District
- Josh Booth, former West Virginia House of Delegates
- Richard Browning, former West Virginia Senate and West Virginia House of Delegates
- Jack Buckalew, former West Virginia Senate

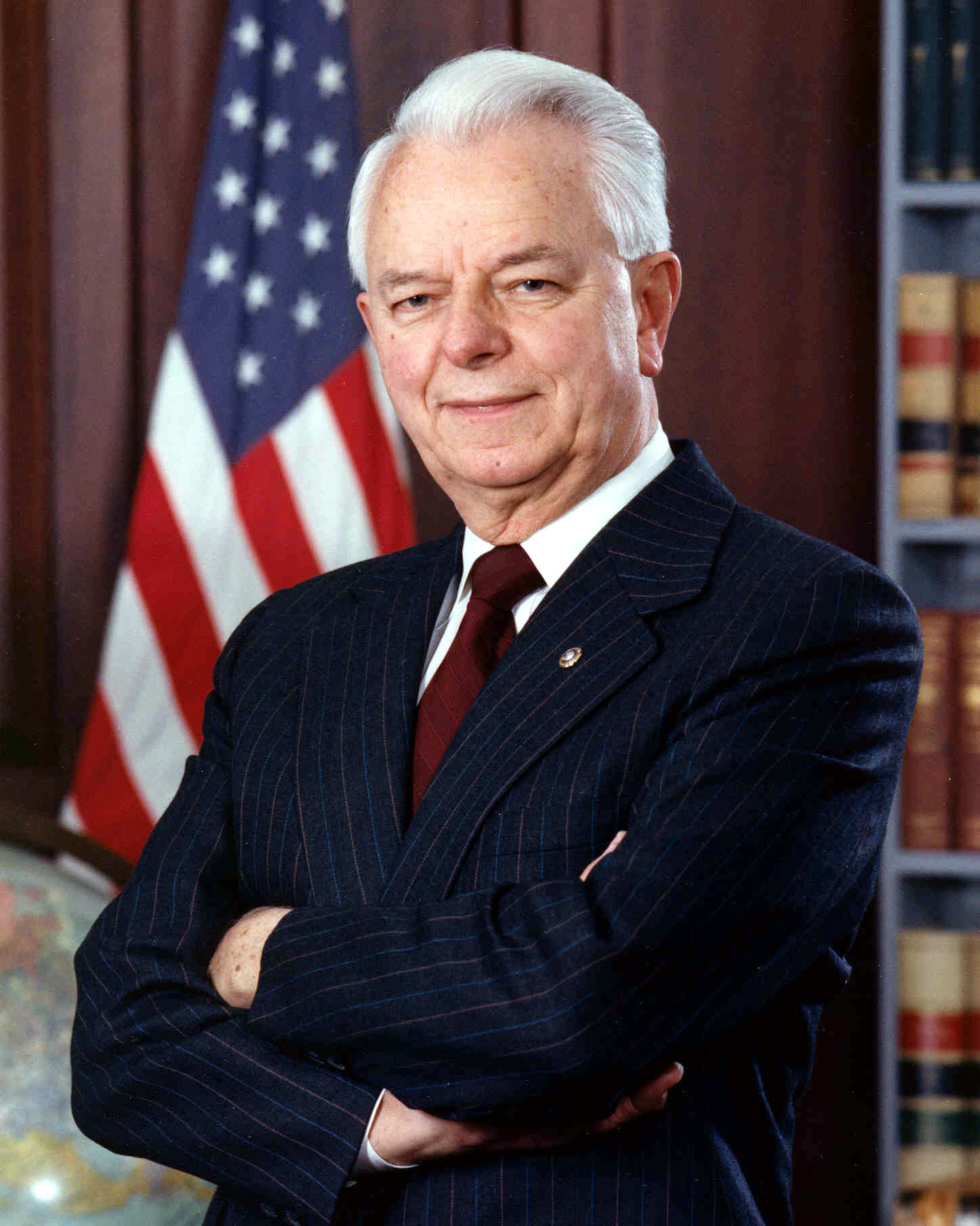
Robert C. Byrd

- Robert C. Byrd, U.S. Senator from West Virginia, 1959–2010
- Denise Campbell, former West Virginia House of Delegates
- Mitch Carmichael, former President of the West Virginia Senate
- Truman Chafin, former West Virginia Senate
- Robert Charles Chambers, former United States district judge of the United States District Court for the Southern District of West Virginia
- Tom Clark, current West Virginia House of Delegates
- Sammy D. Dalton, former West Virginia Senate and West Virginia House of Delegates
- Dennis Davis, current Cabinet Secretary for the West Virginia Department of Veterans Assistance
- Gerardo Del Tufo, former New Jersey State Legislature
- Tracy Dempsey, former West Virginia Senate and West Virginia House of Delegates
- Henry Dillon, current West Virginia House of Delegates (29th district)
- Jeff Eldridge, former West Virginia House of Delegates
- Hubert S. Ellis, former U.S. House of Representatives from West Virginia's 4th congressional district
- David Felinton, former mayor of Huntington, WV, former president of West Virginia Municipal League
- Dana Ferrell, former West Virginia House of Delegates
- Scott Fuller, West Virginia Senate, from the 5th district
- Daniel Hall, former West Virginia Senate and West Virginia House of Delegates
- Mike Hall, former West Virginia Senate
- Walter Hall, member of West Virginia House of Delegates for 58th district
- Homer Heck, former West Virginia House of Delegates
- Robert Holliday, former West Virginia Senate and West Virginia House of Delegates
- Josh Holstein, current West Virginia House of Delegates (32nd district)
- Sean Hornbuckle, current West Virginia House of Delegates (16th district)
- Mark Hunt, current West Virginia Senate (8th district)

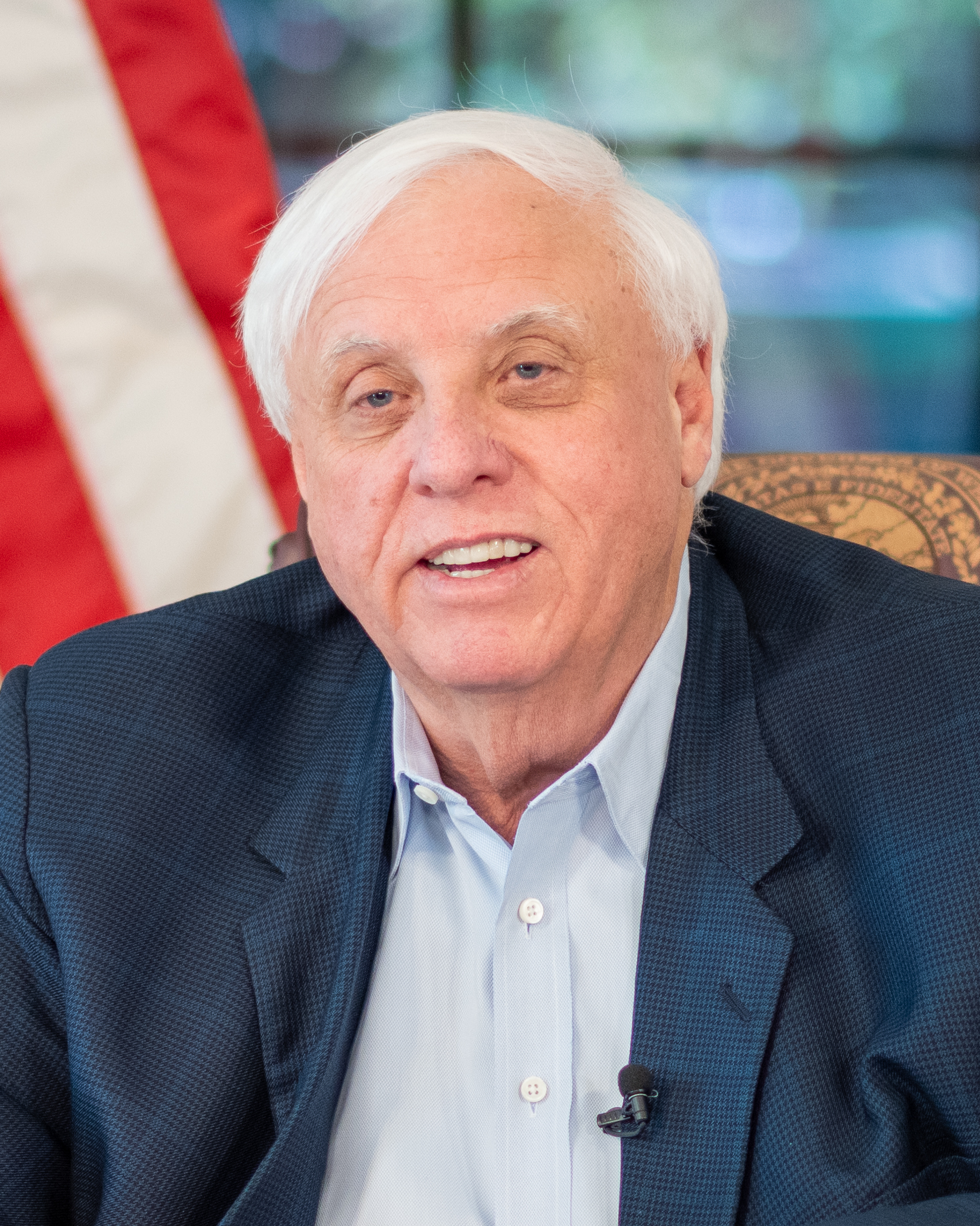
Jim Justice

- Jim Justice, former governor and current senator of West Virginia
- Art Kirkendoll, former West Virginia Senate
- William Laird IV, former West Virginia Senate and West Virginia House of Delegates
- Charlotte Lane, former Chair of the West Virginia Public Service Commission, West Virginia House of Delegates, and Member of the United States International Trade Commission
- Charles C. Lanham, former West Virginia Senate
- Cindy Lavender-Bowe, former West Virginia House of Delegates
- Howard B. Lee, 18th Attorney General of West Virginia
- Daniel Linville, current West Virginia House of Delegates (16th district)
- Patrick Lucas, current West Virginia House of Delegates
- Mike Maroney, former West Virginia Senate
- Mark R. Maynard, current West Virginia Senate (6th district)
- Todd B. Morgan, former Maryland House of Delegates and vice president of the St. Mary's County Board of Commissioners
- Don Perdue, former West Virginia House of Delegates
- David Perry, former West Virginia House of Delegates
- Linda Phillips, former West Virginia House of Delegates
- Robert H. Plymale, current minority whip of West Virginia Senate
- Charlotte Pritt, former West Virginia Senate and West Virginia House of Delegates
- Marie Redd, former West Virginia Senate
- Matthew Rohrbach, current West Virginia House of Delegates (17th district)
- Rick Snuffer, former West Virginia House of Delegates
- Kelli Sobonya, former West Virginia House of Delegates
- Dale Stephens, former West Virginia House of Delegates
- Jimmy Stewart, former Ohio Senate and Ohio House of Representatives
- Ron Stollings, former West Virginia Senate
- Josh Stowers, former West Virginia House of Delegates
- Tom Takubo, current majority leader of West Virginia Senate
- Rick Thompson, former speaker of the West Virginia House of Delegates
- W. H. Seward Thomson, former judge of the United States District Court for the Western District of Pennsylvania

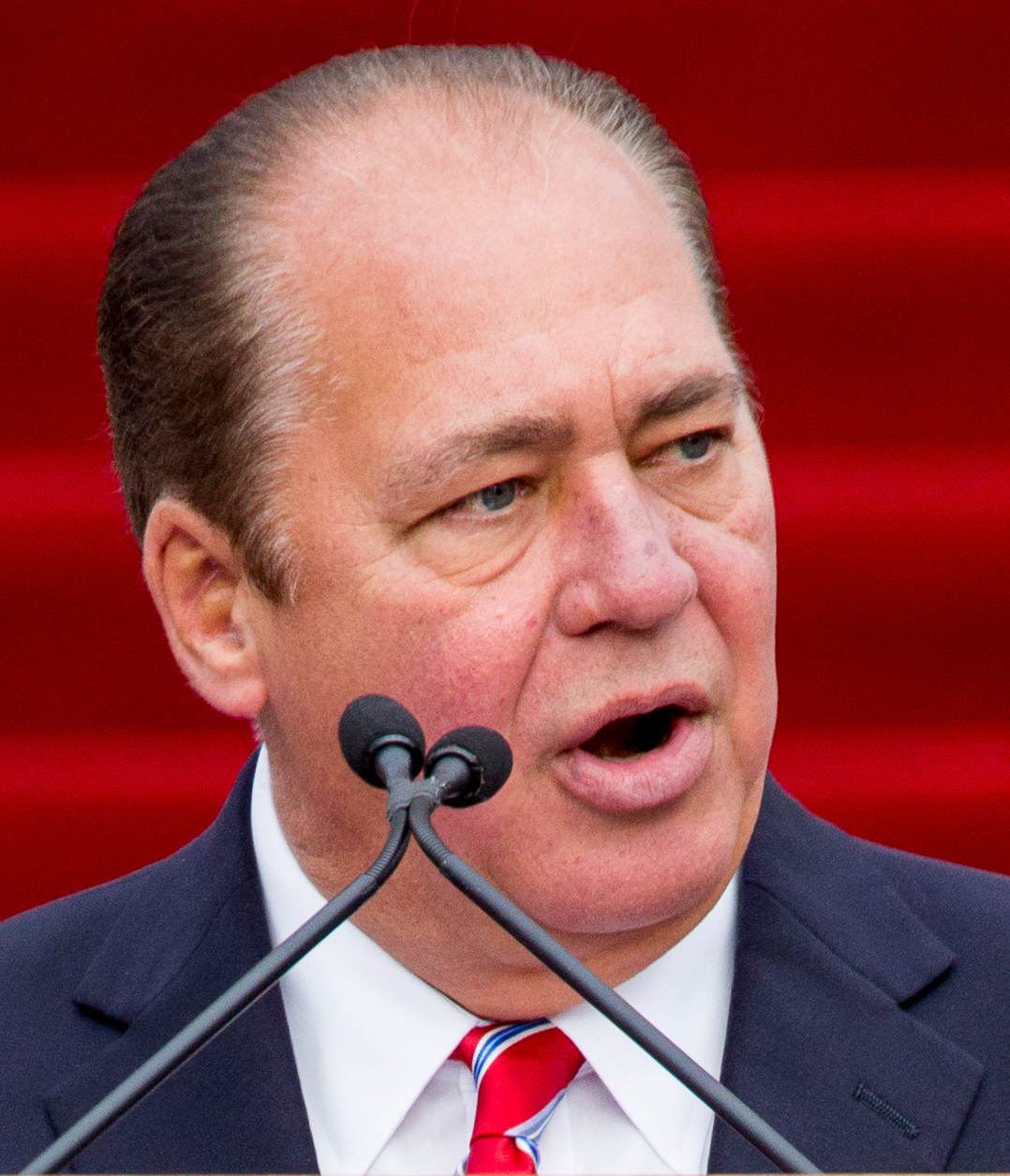
Earl Ray Tomblin

- Earl Ray Tomblin, 35th governor of West Virginia
- Ted Tomblin, former West Virginia House of Delegates
- Johnnie Wamsley, former West Virginia House of Delegates
- Harry Keith White, former West Virginia House of Delegates
- Stephen T. Williams, former mayor of Huntington, West Virginia
- Mike Woelfel, lawyer, current Minority Leader of West Virginia Senate
- William R. Wooton, current Justice of the West Virginia Supreme Court of Appeals
- Evan Worrell, current West Virginia House of Delegates (18th district)
- Jill York, current Kentucky House of Representatives

=== Science ===
- Mary Jean Harrold, former computer scientist noted for her research on software engineering
- Leslie M. Hicks, analytical chemist at the University of North Carolina at Chapel Hill
- Ellen Mosley-Thompson, glaciologist and paleoclimatologist at Ohio State University
- Lonnie Thompson, paleoclimatologist and professor in the School of Earth Sciences at Ohio State University

=== Other ===
- Morris D. Busby, former United States ambassador to Colombia from 1991 to 1994, during which Pablo Escobar was killed
- Adriana Harmeyer, won $351,600 during her 15-day win-streak in June and has qualified three times over for the Tournament of Champions on Jeopardy!
- Cathy Justice, current First Lady of West Virginia
- Kenneth Lester Price Jr., former prelate of the Episcopal Church, who served as suffragan bishop of Southern Ohio
- Mohammed Shabir, former prime minister-in-waiting for Palestinian
- Stephanie Thacker, current judge of the United States Court of Appeals for the Fourth Circuit

== See also ==
- List of people from Huntington, West Virginia
- List of presidents and principals of Marshall University
