= James C. Smith =

James C. Smith may refer to:

- James C. Smith (politician), American lawyer and Secretary of State of Florida
- James C. Smith (general), United States Army general
- Jim Smith (business executive) (James C. Smith), American business executive

== See also ==
- James Smith (disambiguation)
