= Chris Cline =

American coal mining entrepreneur and philanthropist

- Born: Christopher Cline; July 5, 1958; Isaban, West Virginia, U.S.
- Died: July 4, 2019 (aged 60); Abaco Islands, The Bahamas
- Occupation: Businessman
- Years active: 1980–2019
- Spouse(s): Sabrina J. (nee Holley) Cline (m. 19??; died 1987) Kelly Cline (m. 1993; div. 2000)
- Children: 4

Chris Cline (July 5, 1958 – July 4, 2019) was an American coal baron and philanthropist. He had been the majority owner of Foresight Reserves LP, headquartered in St. Louis, Missouri. Regarded by Bloomberg as the "New King Coal", Cline was considered to have been responsible for reviving the Illinois coal industry. His company has over three billion tons of coal reserves across Illinois and northern Appalachian Mountains.

== Early life ==
Cline was born in Beckley, West Virginia, on July 5, 1958. Cline's father was Paul Cline. Cline's mother was Lassie Justice Cline.

Cline's grandfather mined for coal with a pickaxe around Beckley, West Virginia, in the early 20th century. At the age of six, Cline's father, Paul, asked him to fill a paper bag with dirt, paying him a penny for each bag. Cline dug the dirt from under the porch of their bungalow in Isaban, West Virginia. His father used the dirt bags in mine-blasting. Within two years, their porch had collapsed. According to Cline, his father had told him to "support the roof better". In 1980, Cline's father bought out his partner then gave the shares to Cline, who was then 21 years old.

== Education ==
Cline studied psychology at Marshall University in Huntington, West Virginia.

== Career ==
=== Coal mining business ===
In 1980 at age 22, Cline became an underground miner. He founded his own energy development company, the Cline Group, in 1990. In 2006 he organized Foresight Energy to manage his Illinois Basin coal rights. Foresight Energy went public in 2014 on the New York Stock Exchange. Cline sold off most of his share of Foresight in 2015, for $1.4 billion.

Illinois holds a 250-year supply of coal, providing the state with the largest recoverable coal reserve in the United States. In 2017, the state consumed nearly $1.4 billion of coal, with coal mining operations located in 12 counties. However, Illinois coal has too much sulfur to be burned by most power plants because of pollution control requirements. Cline, who spent $300 million on mining rights and equipment in Illinois in the 1990s, had foreseen that the United States Environmental Protection Agency would require power plants to use scrubbers in removing pollutants, which would bring coal back into viability for electricity generation.

In 2005, Cline Group built its Williamson longwall mining operation south of West Frankfort, Illinois.

The company SNL Financial reported in 2008 that Deer Run coal mine in Montgomery County, Illinois, a project of Cline's Hillsboro Energy LLC, would produce up to eight million tons annually until 2016. In the same report, Cline's representatives stated he was aiming for an annual coal production of 60 million tons from his Illinois operations.

Illinois environmental groups and landowners attempted to block Cline's coal mine operations, and also sought to draw attention to his local political contributions.

Cline purchased a Nova Scotia metallurgical coal mine after selling off Foresight stock, as well as rights to coal reserves in Western Canada.

Cline defended coal as a source of low-cost energy, saying in a 2010 interview "As far as the social acceptability of coal, I like to think I’m part of supplying the cheapest energy in America."

== Philanthropy ==
In May 2011, the School of Medicine and the Department of Intercollegiate Athletics of West Virginia University received a $5 million donation from Cline through his Cline Family Foundation. The donation created the Christopher Cline Chair in Orthopaedic Surgery and helped fund a new basketball practice facility.

In July 2011, Marshall University received a donation of $5 million from the Cline Family Foundation for sports medicine research.

== Personal life ==
Cline's first wife was Sabrina J. Holley Cline. They had a daughter, Candice. In September 1987, Cline's first wife died from breast cancer.

In 1993, Cline married Kelly, his second wife. They divorced in 2000. The couple had two sons and a daughter, Christopher Logan Cline, Alex Tanner Cline, and Kameron Cline.

In 2011, Cline's daughter Candice, a director of a foundation, married James Graham Kenan.

Cline owned a 33,413-square-foot (3,104.2 m^{2}) mansion in North Palm Beach, Florida, and a home in his native Beckley, West Virginia, with a 150-acre (61 ha) property. Cline was a charter member of Brenton Southern Baptist Church.

Cline also had a relationship with Elin Nordegren, ex-wife of golfer Tiger Woods.

=== Mine Games ===
Cline owned two megayachts that he christened "Mine Games". The first was a 164-footer built by Trinity Yachts, delivered in 2008. He sold the yacht in 2013, later purchasing another 205-foot (62 m) larger luxury yacht that he also christened "Mine Games". Mine Games, which had five staterooms and its own submarine, was designed and built by Italy-based Benetti in 2010. Cline sold the yacht in the fall of 2018.

=== Political donations ===
In 2015, Jasper Reserves, LLC, owned by Cline, donated one million dollars to Super PACs supporting the presidential candidacy of Jeb Bush.

=== Threats against family ===
On August 20, 2012, Vivek Shah was arrested for the attempted extortion of Chris Cline, Harvey Weinstein, and three other individuals. On or around June 26, 2012, Shah threatened to kill members of Cline's family if $13 million was not wired to an offshore bank account. A seven-count felony indictment against Shah was filed in U.S. District Court in Los Angeles in September 2012, and in 2013 he was sentenced to seven years in prison.

=== Death ===
On July 4, 2019, Cline died in a helicopter crash in Grand Cay, Bahamas. He was 60 years old.

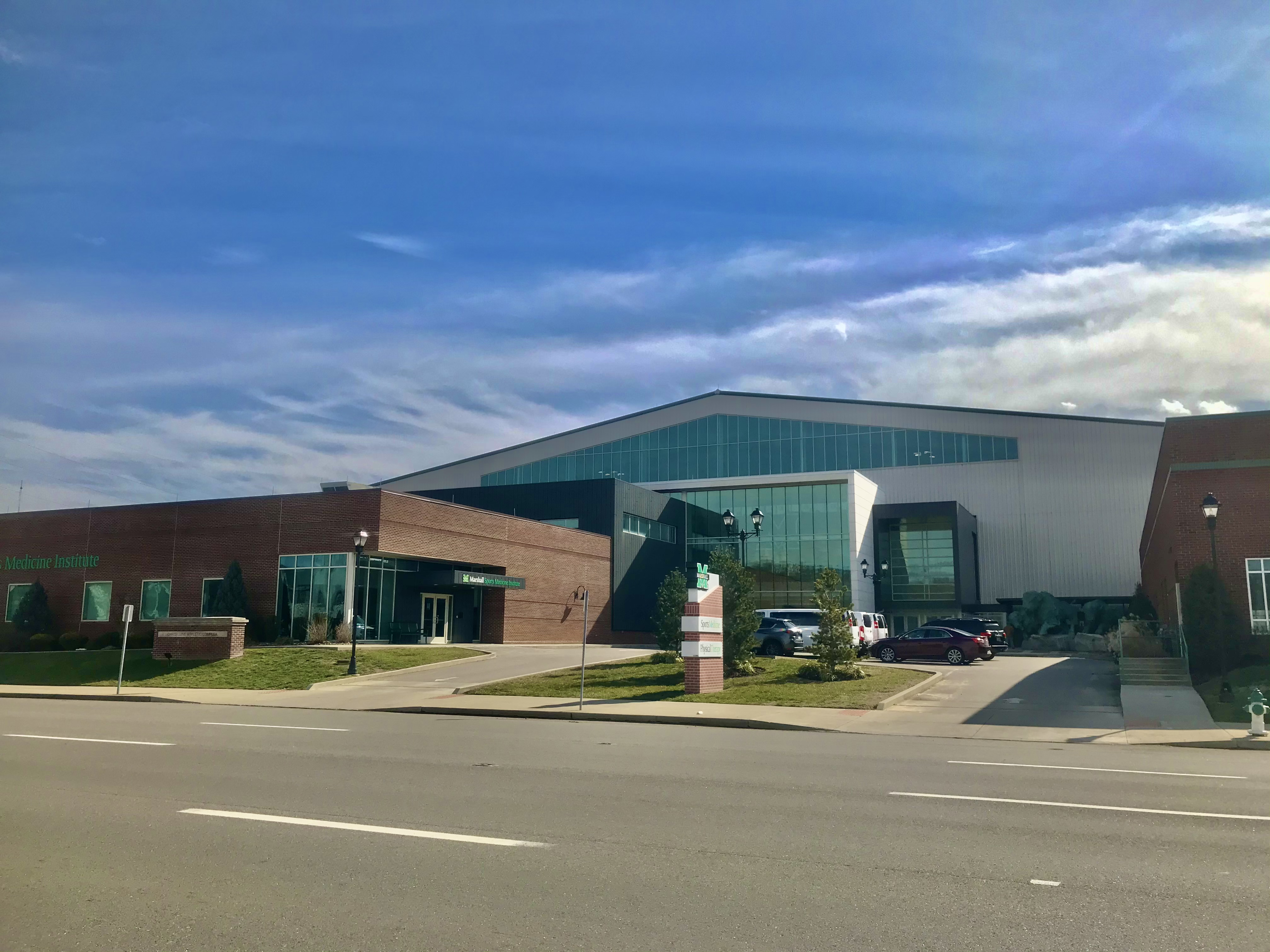
The Chris Cline Athletic Complex at Marshall University in 2021.

Others who perished in the crash with Cline included his 22-year-old daughter Kameron and three of her friends (Brittney Searson, Jillian Clark and Delaney Wykle). They were traveling back from Bahamas to the United States en route to an American hospital after Kameron and one of her friends fell ill. Other casualties were pilot David Jude and co-pilot Geoffrey Lee Painter, an ex-Royal Air Force pilot from Barnstaple, United Kingdom.

In a 2021 report, the National Transportation Safety Board determined that the two pilots chose to take off, likely feeling pressured by Cline, despite dark conditions and lack of visual references over water. They became spatially disorientated and crashed into the sea.

=== Legacy ===
In 2014, Chris Cline Athletic Complex, an indoor football practice facility at Marshall University, was dedicated for Cline.

== See also ==
- List of Marshall University people
