= Christian Spears =

American athletic director

Biographical details
- Born: San Marino, California, U.S.
- Education: University of Washington (BS); Long Beach State University (MPA); Ohio State University (JD)

Administrative career (AD unless noted)
- 2003–2009: Southern Illinois (assistant AD)
- 2009–2014: Northern Illinois (associate AD)
- 2013: Northern Illinois (acting AD)
- 2014–2017: Eastern Michigan (deputy AD)
- 2017: Eastern Michigan (interim AD)
- 2017–2022: Pittsburgh (deputy AD)
- 2022–2025: Marshall

Christian Spears is an American athletic director, most recently at Marshall University. He served as the athletic director at Marshall from February 2022 - August 2025.

== Career ==
Spears began working as the associate director of athletics at Northern Illinois University in 2009 after spending the previous six years as the assistant athletic director at Southern Illinois University. In 2013, Spears was named acting athletic director at NIU after Jeff Compher left to become the athletic director at East Carolina University.

In 2014, Spears was hired as deputy AD at Eastern Michigan University. In 2017, he was named interim AD after Heather Lyke left to become the AD at the University of Pittsburgh. Shortly after becoming interim AD, Spears followed Lyke to Pitt as the deputy athletic director.

In February 2022, Spears was named athletic director at Marshall University replacing interim AD, Jeff O'Malley. As athletic director of Marshall, he oversaw the completion of the fundraising to build a new baseball stadium for the Thundering Herd baseball team.

On April 28, 2025 it was announced that Marshall and Spears mutually agreed he will not remain the university's AD after his contract expires in March 2026. It was announced on July 28, 2025 that Austin Peay’s athletic director Gerald Harrison would serve as the newly appointed AD at Marshall, replacing Spears.
