= Michael Moe Myint =

Burmese business tycoon (born 1952)

- မိုးမြင့်
- Born: 11 September 1952 (age 73); Rangoon, Burma
- Education: International School Bangkok; University of Rangoon; Marshall University
- Occupations: Managing Director of Myint & Associates Company Limited; Former air pilot for Myanmar Airways
- Organization(s): Myint & Associates; MPRL E&P
- Spouse: Ohmar Moe Myint
- Children: Sithu Moe Myint; Phone Kyaw Moe Myint

Michael Moe Myint (Burmese: မိုးမြင့်) is a Burmese business tycoon, who founded and runs 2 major companies in the country's petroleum industry, Myint & Associates, a service provider and MPRL E&P, a gas extraction company.

He was educated at the Methodist English High School (now Dagon1 High School) in Yangon, then at International School Bangkok, University of Rangoon and Marshall University, before returning to Burma. From 1974 to 1987, he served as a pilot for the state-owned Myanma Airways, and served as the personal pilot of Ne Win.

Two years later, in 1989, he founded Myint & Associates. In 1996, he established his own oil exploration and excavation company, Myanmar Petroleum Resources Limited (MPRL).

== Family ==
His two sons, Sithu Moe Myint and Phone Kyaw Moe Myint, both studied at the Colorado School of Mines, and work for multinational oil firms. His father worked as geologist for Shell.
