= Sara Henning =

American poet and professor

Sara Henning is an American poet, editor, and academic whose work has received national literary awards and sustained critical attention. She is the author of three poetry collections published by university presses and serves as an assistant professor of creative writing at Marshall University, where she coordinates the A.E. Stringer Visiting Writers Series.

== Career ==
Henning’s poetry is noted for its formal rigor and thematic engagement with grief, place, and cultural memory. Her first collection, View from True North (Southern Illinois University Press, 2018), was co-winner of the Crab Orchard Series and received the High Plains Book Award.

Her second collection, Terra Incognita (Ohio University Press, 2022), won the Hollis Summers Poetry Prize. Her third collection, Burn (Southern Illinois University Press, 2024), was selected as a Crab Orchard Series in Poetry Editor’s Selection.

Henning’s poems have appeared in journals including Quarterly West, Crab Orchard Review, Crazyhorse, Meridian, Witness, and The Cincinnati Review.

Before joining Marshall University, Henning taught at Stephen F. Austin State University, where she served as Coordinator of Creative Writing and as poetry editor for the Stephen F. Austin State University Press.

== Reception ==
Henning’s work has received sustained critical attention from literary critics and poets. View from True North was praised for its formal control and emotional restraint, with critics noting its ability to address personal and historical trauma through lyric precision. Poet Diane Seuss described the collection as demonstrating “impeccable crafting” and “formal mastery,” situating Henning’s work within a contemporary lineage of formally attentive American poetry.

Terra Incognita was widely noted for its exploration of grief and elegy. Rebecca Morgan Frank, judge of the Hollis Summers Poetry Prize, described the collection as “thrilling with its vibrancy and beauty in the face of loss,” while poet Cyrus Cassells characterized Henning’s elegiac voice as marked by “protean music” and emotional range.

In a review published by RHINO, critic Donna Vorreyer wrote that Burn “moves through reckoning and celebration,” tracing personal history against a fire-scarred landscape and blending lyric intensity with formal control.

Henning has also been featured in interviews discussing her poetic practice. In a 2022 conversation published by the Poetry Foundation’s Harriet blog, she discussed the role of poetic form in confronting grief and described structure as a means of creating meaning in moments of loss.

In 2024, Henning was the featured poet in Delta Poetry Review, where she discussed her evolving relationship to lyric form, memory, and regional identity, further situating her work within contemporary American poetry discourse.

== Awards and honors ==
Henning’s honors include:

- Crazyhorse Lynda Hull Memorial Poetry Prize (2015)
- Poetry Society of America George Bogin Memorial Award (2019)
- Allen Ginsberg Poetry Award (co-winner, 2020)
- High Plains Book Award for View from True North

She has also received scholarships and fellowships from the Sewanee Writers’ Conference and the Appalachian Writers’ Workshop.

== Selected bibliography ==
=== Poetry collections ===
- View from True North. Southern Illinois University Press, 2018.
- Terra Incognita. Ohio University Press, 2022.
- Burn. Southern Illinois University Press, 2024.
