= Samuel E. Kelly =

Samuel E. Kelly Sr. (January 26, 1926 – July 6, 2009) was an American academic. In 1970, he became the first African American senior administrator at the University of Washington.

In that year, he was appointed by university president Charles Odegaard to be the first vice president for minority affairs. He was also the first Black instructor at a community college in Washington State.

Kelly rose to prominence following a 1968 occupation of a UW building by members of the UW Black Student Union. The Samuel E. Kelly Ethnic Cultural Center is named for him.

== Background ==
Kelly was born in 1926 in Greenwich, Connecticut and entered the U.S. Army in 1944. He served in the Army for 22 years before retiring in 1966 at a lieutenant colonel. While in the Army, he earned a Bachelor of Arts from West Virginia State College and a Master of Arts in History from Marshall University in Huntington, West Virginia. He then began teaching at Everett Junior College and Shoreline Community College.
