= Myint & Associates =

- Company type: Private
- Industry: Petroleum industry
- Founded: 1989
- Founder: Michael Moe Myint
- Headquarters: Hlaing Township, Yangon, Myanmar
- Area served: Myanmar (Burma)
- Services: Exploration and extraction
- Revenue: $12 million USD
- Owner: Michael Moe Myint
- Subsidiaries: MPRL E&P
- Website: www.myintassociates.com

Myint & Associates is a major service provider for oil and gas companies that operate in Myanmar (Burma), providing supply and logistical services. It was the first private company in the country to operate and provide these services. The company's clients include Total, Unocal, Halliburton and Petronas.
