= West Virginia Department of Veterans Assistance =

State agency of West Virginia

Agency overview
- Jurisdiction: The state of West Virginia
- Headquarters: 1900 Kanawha Blvd Building 5 Room 205 Charleston, WV 25301
- Agency executives: Dennis Davis (West Virginia official), Secretary of Veterans Assistance; Billy Wayne Bailey, Deputy Secretary of Veterans Assistance
- Website: www.veterans.wv.gov

The West Virginia Department of Veterans Assistance is a cabinet-level agency of the West Virginia state government. It is the newest cabinet level department, having been broken off from the West Virginia Department of Military Affairs and Public Safety in 2011.

The mission of the West Virginia Department of Veterans Assistance is to provide aid to West Virginia veterans and their qualifying dependents.

The West Virginia Department of Veterans Assistance provides a number of benefits and programs in its efforts to serve West Virginia's veteran population.

Dennis Davis has been the Department Secretary since 2017.

== Benefit offices ==
The Department operates 16 benefit offices throughout West Virginia. The staff at these offices are trained to provide aid to veterans and their dependents. The services provided at these locations are free of charge.

== Benefits and programs ==
Military Retirement Pay State Income Tax Exemption: For taxable years beginning after December 31, 2017, military retirement income, including retirement income from the regular Armed Forces, Reserves and National Guard paid by the United States or the State of West Virginia are exempt from state income tax.

High School Diplomas for Veterans: This program helps veterans of WWII, Korea, and/or Vietnam receive a high school diploma, if they have not done so already.

Jack Bennett Fund: This fund was created in order to help the families of deceased veterans obtain grave markers.

Veterans Bonuses: The state offers a cash bonus for those veterans having served in the War in Afghanistan.

Veteran Re-education Assistance: This program offers up to a $500 per semester stipend to veterans who are enrolled in a certified post-secondary class.

Veterans and Warriors to Agriculture Program: This program aims to help introduce veterans to agricultural work and supports veterans currently working in agriculture.

War Orphan Education Program: For those who qualify, students will not be charged tuition and fees by a West Virginia post-secondary education or training institution.

West Virginia Military Connection: This program works in tandem with Workforce West Virginia and the West Virginia Department of Labor to help put veterans in touch with training and employment opportunities.

Homestead Exemption: This program provides exemption from certain property taxes for veterans with 100% service and total service-connected disabilities.

In-state Tuition Rates for Nonresident Veterans: This benefit allows all veterans to receive an in-state tuition rate if they are a recipient of the GI Bill and enroll within three years of being discharged.

Medal of Honor & Purple Heart Tuition Waivers: This benefit waives all tuition for public higher education institutions for any West Virginia resident who has been awarded the Medal of Honor or the Purple Heart.

Military Incentive Program: This service encourages the private sector to employ veterans by providing a tax credit.

Veterans Awards for Excellence: This program is designed to acknowledge standout veterans in the work force.

Veteran Designation on West Virginia Driver's Licenses: This program helps veterans receive special recognition for their vehicle's license plate.

Veterans’ License Plates: This program provides special license plates for qualifying veterans.

Veteran Hunting and Fishing Licenses: This program helps qualifying veterans receive a free West Virginia hunting and fishing license.

Veterans Preferences: This program provides veteran recognition when a qualifying individual applies for a position in the West Virginia Civil Service System. Veterans Upward Bound: This program supports the efforts of public institutions to be veteran friendly by providing academic and student support services that address the unique needs of student veterans.

West Virginia State Parks “Veterans’ Salute”: This program provides a 10% discount to veterans and active military personnel at West Virginia State parks.

Yellow Ribbon G.I. Education Enhancement Program: This program helps veterans with higher education cost that exceed the funding provided for by the G.I. Bill.

== West Virginia Veterans Nursing Home ==
The Department operates a 120,000-square foot, 120 bed nursing facility in Clarksburg, West Virginia. The Veterans Nursing Home was completed in 2008. No veteran is turned away due to finances at this institution.

== West Virginia Veterans Home ==
The Department operates a 150-bed facility located on a 23-acre plot in Barboursville, West Virginia. The Veterans Home, authorized in 1975 and opened in 1981, serves as a home in time of need for veterans who were discharged under honorable conditions. The facility employs a recreation supervisor and five recreation specialists that plan events that encourage participation and self-improvement. A well-provisioned library facilitates learning, and several lounges throughout the facility encourage social interaction.

== The Donel C. Kinnard State Veterans Cemetery ==
The Donel C. Kinnard Memorial State Veterans Cemetery is located on a 348-acre plot of land in Institute, West Virginia. The cemetery will eventually provide a dignified resting place for 66,000 of our state's honored veterans and their closest family.

A U.S. Department of Veterans Affairs grant helped facilitate construction of the cemetery. Work began in October 2010. The opening and dedication ceremony was held on Memorial Day 2012.
