= Jim Smith (business executive) =

American business executive (born 1959)

- Born: 1959 (age 66–67); Carlisle, Kentucky, US
- Education: Marshall University
- Occupations: Business executive, journalist
- Employer: Thomson Reuters
- Board member of: Atlantic Council; Pfizer, Inc. WEF Partnering Against Corruption Initiative
- Website: Corporate biography

James C. Smith (born 1959) is an American business executive. He started his career as a journalist and editor, joined Thomson Newspapers in 1987 and subsequently held management positions such as head of Thomson Newspapers in North America and chief operating officer (COO) of the Thomson Corporation. After being CEO of Thomson Reuters' professional division, Thomson Reuters named him COO in 2011 and CEO in January 2012. In February 2020, Steve Hasker succeeded Smith as President and CEO of Thomson Reuters. Involved with initiatives such as the international business council of the World Economic Forum, he is also on the board of Pfizer.

== Early life and education ==
James C. Smith was born in 1959 in Carlisle, Kentucky, where he spent his youth. Attending Marshall University in Huntington, West Virginia on a football scholarship, he was active in student affairs before graduating magna cum laude in 1981 with a bachelor's degree. In 2017, the university awarded him an honorary doctorate.

== Career ==
Early in his career Smith worked as a journalist for small newspapers such as the Carlisle Mercury, where he was both a reporter and an editor. He was the managing editor of the Charleston Daily Mail when it was acquired by Thomson Newspapers in 1987, at which point Smith joined the Thomson newspaper group. He initially held several staff and operating positions, after which he was made responsible for Thomson Newspapers' operations in North America. According to Reuters, while he was the head of the unit in the United States, Thomson Newspapers became "one of the first media companies to shift away from the declining newspaper business to focus on electronic publishing."

After the company sold its newspaper business in 2000, Smith moved to the Thomson Corporation's professional publishing side. With responsibility for "a number of businesses serving the legal, regulatory and academic markets," in December 2001 he became Thomson's executive vice president of human resources and administration. He then became the company's executive VP of development and corporate affairs in January 2002, and in April 2005 he was appointed president and chief executive officer (CEO) of Thomson Corporation's academic publishing division. Smith subsequently was Thomson's chief operating officer (COO).

=== Thomson Reuters COO and CEO ===
After the formation of Thomson Reuters in April 2008, Smith was named president and CEO of the combined company's professional division, which sells tax, legal, and accounting products. Smith was then made COO of Thomson Reuters Corporation in late September 2011 as "part of a move by the company to overhaul the structure of the group." On January 1, 2012, Smith became CEO and president of Thomson Reuters. Smith was succeeded by Steve Hasker as Thomson Reuters' President and CEO in February 2020.

== Memberships ==
Smith is on the international business council of the World Economic Forum and the international advisory boards of the British American Business Council and the Atlantic Council. A director of Pfizer, Inc. since June 26, 2014, he is also on the boards of the World Economic Forum's Partnering Against Corruption Initiative and the Brazil-U.S. Business Council.

== Personal life ==
He lives in Toronto, Ontario, Canada with his wife Pam Kushmerick. He has four sons.

He was inducted into the Marshall University College of Business Hall of Fame in 2014, and he delivered the keynote address for Marshall University's commencement ceremony in 2017.

== See also ==
- List of Marshall University people
