= Jeff Compher =

Administrative career (AD unless noted)
- 1986–1992: NC State (assistant AD)
- 1998–2000: Vanderbilt (associate AD)
- 2000–2004: Western Carolina
- 2004–2008: Washington (associate AD)
- 2008–2013: Northern Illinois
- 2013–2018: East Carolina

Jeff Compher is a former American collegiate athletics administrator. He was the athletic director at East Carolina University from April 2013 to May 2018.

== College ==
In 1980, Compher earned a bachelor's degree in psychology from James Madison University, where he also played football, then graduated from Shippensburg University in 1982 with a master's degree in counseling and student personnel services.

== Career ==
Compher served as Athletic Director at Western Carolina University from 2000-2004, and held athletic administrative positions at North Carolina State University, Vanderbilt University, and the University of Washington. He was athletic director Northern Illinois University for five years.

=== East Carolina ===
Compher was named athletic director at East Carolina in April 2013. Compher was tasked with leading ECU into the Big East Conference in 2014, which would later be renamed the American Athletic Conference. ECU was originally invited as a football only member, but later was admitted for all sports.

== Controversies ==
While at ECU, Compher's first big decision as athletics director was to fire popular head football Ruffin McNeill after a 5-7 season. This gained national attention and uproar at ECU as Ruffin McNeill posted the second-most wins in school history with multiple nationally-ranked teams. Compher was quoted saying "Our expectations are to compete for championships" and “Regardless of the feedback I was offered, I knew this was my decision″ Compher then hired Scottie Montgomery, who produced three straight 3-9 seasons. Compher admitted in an interview that he didn't go on the field for in-game ceremonies during the football season in fear of being booed by the fans. Compher agreed to resign from his position as AD in March 2018, and Montgomery was fired later that year.

Compher's resignation included a $1,262,500 buyout agreement to be paid out over five years which gained much criticism by ECU fans due to having signed the contract just months before the resignation and which resulted in 4 ECU sports teams being cut due to financial hardship. Compher was hired in October 2019 by WittKieffer, an executive search firm, but his employment with that firm did not reduce his payments from ECU.

== Family ==
Compher is married to Cathy and the couple have two sons, C.J. and David.

== See also ==
- List of NCAA Division I athletic directors
