= WMUL =

Radio station at Marshall University in Huntington, West Virginia

- Huntington, West Virginia; United States
- Broadcast area: Metro Huntington
- Frequency: 88.1 MHz
- Branding: 88.1 WMUL

Programming
- Format: Variety

Ownership
- Owner: Marshall University; (Marshall University Board of Governors)

History
- First air date: 1961
- Call sign meaning: W Marshall University Labs or Libraries (no documentation has been found to state one way or another)

Technical information
- Licensing authority: FCC
- Facility ID: 66564
- Class: A
- Power: 1,400 Watts
- HAAT: -15 Meters
- Transmitter coordinates: 38°25′26.88″N 82°25′43.05″W

Links
- Public license information: Public file; LMS
- Webcast: WMUL Webstream (Feed 1); WMUL Webstream (Feed 2); WMUL Webstream (Feed 3)
- Website: WMUL Online

WMUL is a college broadcast radio station licensed to Marshall University in Huntington, West Virginia, serving Metro Huntington. The Marshall University Board of Governors owns WMUL's FCC license, and a board of directors composed of students and community volunteers, under the direction of Faculty Manager Dr. Charles G. Bailey, handles the day-to-day operations.

== Sports programming ==
WMUL's sports department covers more Marshall sporting events live than any other media entity. It broadcasts all of Marshall's home college football games, which is a rare opportunity for college radio stations. It also broadcasts Marshall's home soccer, volleyball, basketball (men's and women's), softball, and baseball games. The station broadcasts some of Marshall's away football, baseball and women's basketball games, and is the exclusive home of the 2013 Conference USA Champion Marshall Softball team.

== News programming ==
The news department broadcasts newsbriefs at the top of the hour from 12-3 p.m. Monday-Friday. The flagship broadcast, "The 5 p.m. Edition of NewsCenter 88," runs for 30 minutes and covers events happening around Marshall, the Huntington Tri-State region, and the rest of the nation. It also includes the five-minute "FM 88 Sports Report" and a minute-long "Metro Huntington Weather Forecast." The station also produces news/talk shows each semester and occasionally produces and airs the "Insight Into Old Main" series, dealing with various parts of the Marshall University administration.

== Awards ==
As of summer 2024, the station has won 2,519 national and regional awards since 1985, the year Faculty Manager Dr. Charles G. Bailey began tracking awards. The record number of awards attained in one school year was initially set in 2010–2011, when the station received 131 national and regional awards. That record was broken in the 2016–2017 school year when the station received 132 national and regional awards. That record though was not held for long as the station out did itself again in the 2018–2019 school year when it received 146 national and regional awards, it also received 63 2nd place awards that school year, the most 2nd place awards its ever won in a single school year, per http://www.marshall.edu/wmul/wmul-awards/.

WMUL has won numerous awards through the National Broadcasting Society (NBS) contest, including winning Best Sports Play-by-Play, Best Audio Magazine Program, Best Audio Sports Package, Best Audio Sports Program and Best Audio Promo in the 2015 contest. This contest is open only to individual NBS members and member colleges. Another major contest for the station is The Virginias Associated Press Broadcasters Association awards. The station's FM 88 Sports Team was named Outstanding Sports Operation in the non-metro division of the 2015 Virginias AP Broadcasters Awards. Other winners in that contest were Outstanding Effort by an Individual Reporter, Best Coverage of a Spot News Story, Best Feature or Human Interest Story and Best Sports Feature Story. The Virginias AP Broadcasters Association is open to all broadcast media, commercial and non-commercial, that includes West Virginia and/or Virginia as part or all of its coverage area.
