= Charles G. Bailey =

Dr. Charles Gene Bailey has been the Faculty Manager of WMUL, Marshall University's student operated radio station, since 1985. He is also a professor in the School of Journalism and Mass Communications, specializing in Radio and Television Production and Management. Dr. Bailey was raised in Proctor Bottom, Logan County, West Virginia, where, as a child, he listened to Cleveland Browns games on the radio and dreamed of becoming a broadcaster. He graduated from Man High School in 1970, and seldom missed Man Hillbilly football games (wherever in the state they were played) for the next thirty years.

His father owned a trucking company that hauled coal for local coal mines. For a time Bailey himself worked for his father's company before obtaining a master's degree from Marshall University in 1985. He subsequently accepted the position of faculty manager with WMUL, which at that time had won 3 awards in broadcasting championships. After 25 years of Bailey's leadership, WMUL has now won over 2252 awards for broadcasting excellence, and he has guided hundreds of young broadcasters into careers in mass communications. Shortly after becoming WMUL's faculty manager Bailey purchased a 1987 red and white Ford Bronco, which he still drives.

He has been awarded the Distinguished Four-Year Broadcast Adviser Award (1995), The John Marshall Award for Extraordinary Service to West Virginia Higher Education (2000), and Significant Impact Award (also 2000) from the West Virginia Associated Press Broadcasters Association. In 2007 he won his most prestigious award: a Lifetime Achievement Award from the North Virginia Associated Press Broadcasters Association. In 2013, Bailey was inaugurated in the first ever class of the West Virginia Broadcasting Hall of Fame during a ceremony held at the Museum of Radio and Technology in Huntington, WV. He currently resides in Huntington, West Virginia.
