= Thomas E. Ross =

American geographer

Thomas E. Ross (born 1942) is a retired professor of geography at the University of North Carolina at Pembroke. Educated at Marshall University (BA in 1968 and MS in 1969) he gained his Ph.D. in geography from University of Tennessee at Knoxville in 1977. He is an internationally recognized authority on Carolina bays, having written the definitive bibliography of bays (Carolina Bays: An Annotated Bibliography. Carolinas Press. ISBN 1-891026-09-7) In addition to his widely praised research on the bays, Ross has written books on American Indians, including American Indians: A Cultural Geography and American Indians in North Carolina: Geographic Interpretations. He is a native of West Virginia and currently resides in Southern Pines, NC.
