= Dennis Davis (politician) =

American politician

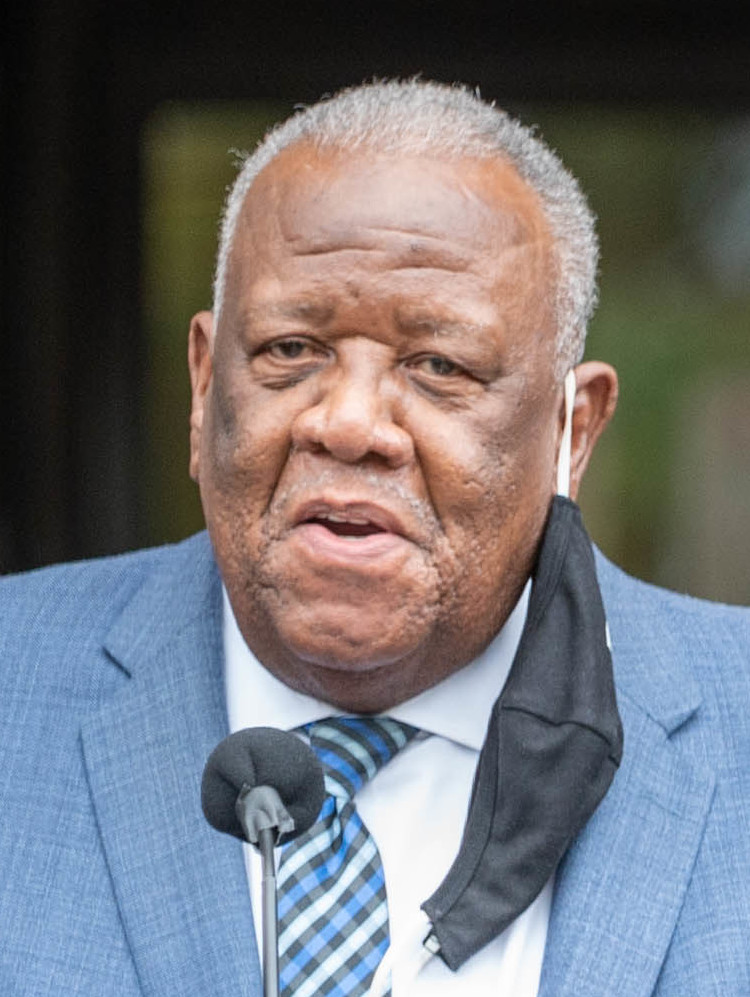
- Davis in 2020

Cabinet Secretary of the West Virginia Department of Veterans Assistance
- In office January 2017 – January 2021

Personal details
- Born: December 9, 1941 Charleston, West Virginia, U.S.
- Died: January 18, 2021 (aged 79) Institute, West Virginia, U.S.
- Spouse: Margaret Davis
- Children: 5
- Occupation: Military, Education, Real Estate

Dennis Elwood Davis, Sr. (December 9, 1941 - January 18, 2021) was an American politician and U.S. Army veteran who served as Cabinet Secretary for the West Virginia Department of Veterans Assistance from 2017 until his death in 2021.

Governor Jim Justice appointed Davis to the position at the start of his first term of governor in 2017.

== Early life ==
Dennis Davis was a lifelong resident of Institute, West Virginia. After attending public schools in Kanawha County, Davis attended West Virginia State University and Marshall University earning degrees in industrial arts education, and vocational, technical and adult education.

== Military career ==
In 1959, Davis began his military activity as a member of the West Virginia State University ROTC program. His U.S. Army career included stints at Fort Knox, Kentucky and Fort Sill, Oklahoma. In 1965, he graduated from the Non-Commissioned Officers Academy.

Davis had been a member of the honor guard at the Donel C. Kinnard Memorial State Veterans Cemetery in Dunbar since 2012.

== Education career ==
An educator, Davis began his career as a teacher at Dupont Junior High School in 1968. Davis went on to become Job Placement Specialist at the Ben Franklin Career Center, Coordinator of Adult Education at the Garnet Career Center, Coordinator of Cooperative Education and finally Assistant Superintendent of Kanawha County Schools for Vocational, Technical and Adult Education. Davis spent 29 years with the school system.

Davis was elected president of the West Virginia Vocational Association and chairman of the Bylaws Committee for the American Vocational Association.

== Previous Political Appointments ==
In 1996, Governor Cecil H. Underwood appointed Davis as executive director of Workforce Development for West Virginia, where he served for 4 years.

In 2013, Davis served briefly as a member of the Kanawha County Board of Education, filling a previous member's unexpired term.

== Personal life and death ==
Davis founded the Davis Property Preservation Company and retired from this work in 2009. He lived in Institute, West Virginia with his wife Margaret, with whom he had five children.

Davis died on January 18, 2021. His family was presented with the Distinguished West Virginian Award in his honor by Governor Jim Justice.
