= Tom Bailey (author) =

American short story writer (born 1961)

Tom Bailey (born 1961) is an author, editor, and former teacher in the Creative Writing program at Susquehanna University. He has published two novels, a collection of short fiction, and two textbooks on writing short stories. He has also been widely published in anthologies and literary journals including New Stories From the South and DoubleTakes. The latter published his short story, Snow Dreams, which was selected for the 2000 The Pushcart Prize anthology and would become the basis for his debut novel, The Grace that Keeps this World.

He received a Newhouse Award from the John Gardner Foundation and was awarded a National Endowment for the Arts Fellowship in Fiction.

== Books ==
- On Writing Short Stories (editor) (Oxford University Press 1999)
- A Short Story Writer's Companion (Oxford University Press 2000)
- Crow Man (Etruscan Press, 2003)
- The Grace that Keeps this World (Crown Publishing Group, 2005)
- Cotton Song (Shaye Areheart Books, 2006)
