= Old Huntington High School =

Huntington High School
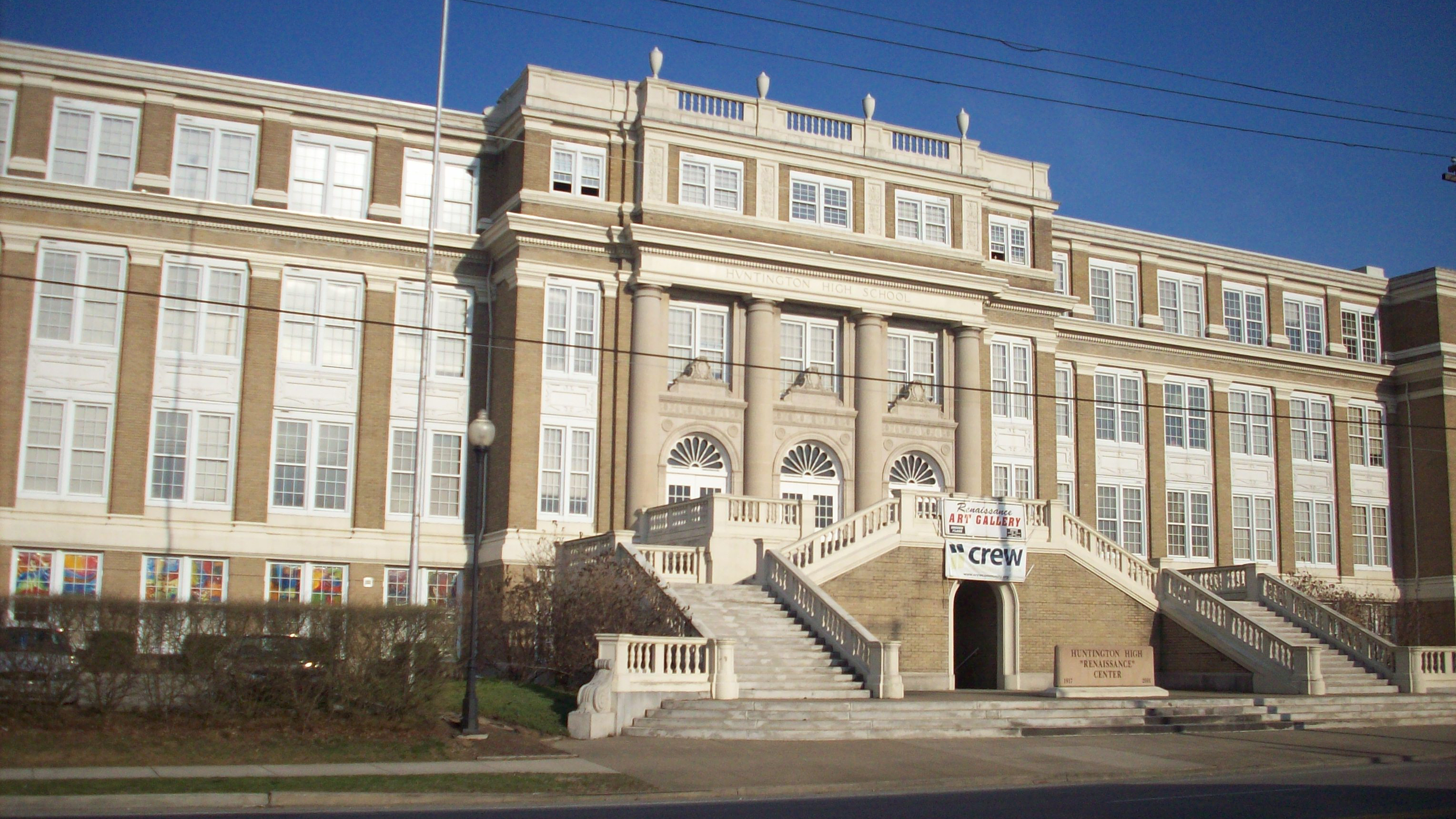
- Old Huntington High School, March 2009

Location
- 900 Eighth St. Huntington, West Virginia 25701; United States

Information
- School type: Public
- Established: 1916
- Closed: 1996
- School district: Cabell County Schools
- Grades: 10-12
- Campus type: Urban
- Colors: Red and blue
- Mascot: Pony Express
- Rivals: Huntington East
- Huntington High School
- U.S. National Register of Historic Places
- Location within West Virginia Location within the United States
- Location: 900 Eighth St., Huntington, West Virginia
- Coordinates: 38°24′46″N 82°26′34″W
- Area: 3.5 acres (1.4 ha)
- Built: 1916
- Architect: Verus T. Ritter
- Architectural style: Classical Revival
- NRHP reference No.: 00000248
- Added to NRHP: April 4, 2000

Old Huntington High School is a historic high school building located at Huntington, Cabell County, West Virginia. It was built in 1916, and is a 4 1/2-story buff-brick building in the Classical Revival style. It consists of a long rectangle with a shorter rectangular wing on each end of the main rectangle forming a "U" shape. The courtyard is enclosed with three additions completed in 1951 (gymnasium), 1956 (cafeteria), and 1977. The building contains 155,512 square feet (14,447.5 m^{2}) of space. The kitchen is located in an older red brick building built in 1916, built originally as a carriage house. The last graduating class was in 1996. A new facility was built to consolidate Old Huntington High and Huntington East High School into a single institution; the new school opened in August 1996 as Huntington High School. It is now known as The Renaissance Center. Part of the building was converted into apartments. The YMCA uses part of it for workout facilities and a daycare facility. The building also houses studio space, an auditorium, and small art gallery.

It was listed on the National Register of Historic Places in 2000.

== Notable alumni ==
- 1917 - Charlie Honaker, former NFL halfback, Cleveland Bulldogs
- 1917 - Hoge Workman, retired relief pitcher in Major League Baseball and a player-coach in the National Football League
- 1922 - Johnson Fry, former MLB pitcher, Cleveland Indians
- 1930 - Eddie King, former athletic director, Morris Harvey College
- 1939 - Dagmar, former actress, model, and television personality of 1950
- 1942 - Marshall Hawkins, retired NBA basketball Forward
- 1944 - Soupy Sales, former comedian and entertainer, notable panelist on the television hit What's My Line?
- 1948 - Bob Orders, former NFL center, Green Bay Packers
- 1955 - Leo Byrd, gold medalist at the 1959 Pan American Games for Basketball
- 1955 - Homer Heck, former West Virginia House of Delegates
- 1962 - Jacqueline Jackson, author and peace activist
- 1974 - Stephen T. Williams, former West Virginia House of Delegates, mayor of Huntington, West Virginia
- 1977 - Bruce R. Evans, venture capitalist, corporate director and philanthropist
- 1982 - Rick Reed, former MLB starting pitcher for the Cincinnati Reds, Pittsburgh Pirates, New York Mets, and Minnesota Twins
- 1983 - Jim Thornton, radio, television announcer, and voice actor; current Wheel of Fortune announcer
- 1984 - Ken Chertow, U.S. Olympic freestyle wrestler at the 1988 Summer Olympics

== Popular culture ==
- In 1964, multiple scenes of Teen-Age Strangler were shot at and in the Old Huntington High School building.

== See also ==
- National Register of Historic Places listings in Cabell County, West Virginia
