= 2022 Huntington High School walkouts =

Student protest in West Virginia, United States

- Date: February 9, 2022
- Location: Huntington High School; 38°23′38″N 82°23′55″W
- Caused by: Mandatory Christian assemblies
- Goals: Separation of church and state
- Methods: Walkout

The 2022 Huntington High School walkouts refer to student-led protests that took place in February 2022 at Huntington High School in Huntington, West Virginia. The walkout occurred in response to a mandatory Christian religious assembly held during the school day, which students and civil liberties organizations argued violated the constitutional separation of church and state and the state's prohibition on religious instruction in public schools.

== Background ==
On February 2, 2022, a Christian revival assembly was held at Huntington High School during instructional hours. The event featured religious messaging and prayer and was attended by students on campus. Some students reported feeling they had been misled about whether attendance was voluntary, and at least one student, Samuel Felinton, who is Jewish, said he asked to leave but was not permitted to do so.

== Event ==
Students raised objections that the assembly amounted to school endorsement of religion, which they argued conflicted with the Establishment Clause of the First Amendment to the Constitution of the United States. The assembly drew rapid attention from parents, students, and national civil liberties organizations, who questioned the approval process for the event and whether students had been given a meaningful opportunity to opt out without facing pressure or consequences.

On February 9, 2022, Max Nibert, Cameron Mays, and Samuel Felinton led hundreds of students in a coordinated walkout that continued over several school days. Students left the building and gathered outside the school, holding signs and chanting slogans calling for religious freedom and the separation of church and state. Media coverage highlighted Nibert and Felinton's leadership, noting that Felinton, who is Jewish, objected to being required to attend the assembly. Both students described the protest as focused on constitutional protections and ensuring religious neutrality in public education.

== Following ==
The walkout prompted responses from school district officials, who stated that participation in the religious assembly had been voluntary and that the policies were under review. The incident also drew commentary from national organizations focused on civil liberties and religious freedom, which argued that the assembly raised constitutional concerns.

=== Impact ===
Following the walkout, the controversy led to increased scrutiny of school-sponsored events involving religious content. The incident became a frequently cited example in discussions of student activism and Establishment Clause issues in American public schools, and it also resulted in a lawsuit, alongside Freedom from Religion Foundation, which banned teacher-sponsored religious events within Cabell County schools.
