= Salt rock =

Salt rock or Salt Rock may refer to:

- Rock salt
- Salt Rock, seaside village in South Africa
- Salt Rock, West Virginia, USA
- Salt Rock Township, Marion County, Ohio, USA
- Salt Rock State Campground, park in Connecticut, USA
- Ezra Millington "Salt Rock" Midkiff, American baseball player
- Saltrock, a surfwear company
- Salt rock lamp, a lamp made of Himalayan salt
