= Barboursville, West Virginia =

- Village
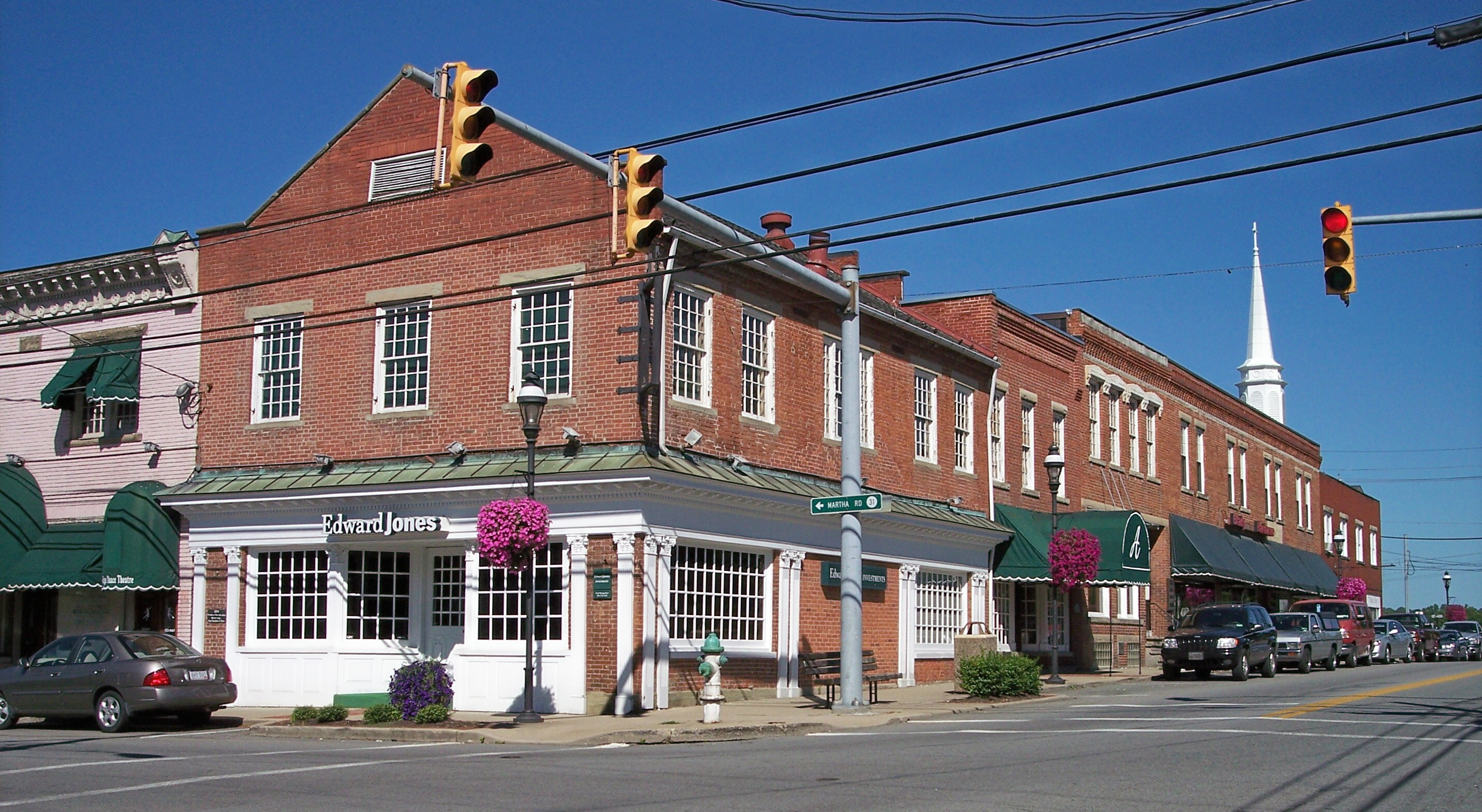
- Main Street in the Barboursville Historic District in 2007

- Flag Seal Logo
- Motto: Best Little Village in the State
- Location of Barboursville in Cabell County, West Virginia.
- Coordinates: 38°24′40″N 82°17′52″W
- Country: United States
- State: West Virginia
- County: Cabell
- Chartered: 1813

Government
  - Mayor: Chris Tatum

Area
  - Total: 4.19 sq mi (10.84 km^{2})
  - Land: 4.09 sq mi (10.60 km^{2})
  - Water: 0.097 sq mi (0.25 km^{2})
- Elevation: 581 ft (177 m)

Population (2020)
  - Total: 4,456
  - Estimate (2022): 4,394
  - Density: 1,040.8/sq mi (401.87/km^{2})
- Time zone: UTC-5 (Eastern (EST))
  - Summer (DST): UTC-4 (EDT)
- ZIP code: 25504
- Area codes: 304, 681
- FIPS code: 54-04276
- GNIS feature ID: 1553799
- Website: Official website

Barboursville is a village in Cabell County, West Virginia, United States. The population was 4,456 at the 2020 census. It is part of the Huntington–Ashland metropolitan area.

== History ==
Barboursville was platted in 1813. Barboursville was then chartered in 1813 and incorporated in 1867.

The Barboursville Historic District was listed on the National Register of Historic Places in 2008. The Thornburg House was separately listed in 1991. Barboursville also contains the historic Miller House, a building constructed in 1835 by local pioneer William Clendenin Miller, grandson of Major George Clendenin, who served under Lt. Colonel Daniel Boone in the 1774 Battle of Point Pleasant, and along with Boone was the first representative of Kanawha County.

List of mayors of Barboursville, West Virginia
- G.W. Ayers, 1898
- Andrew Jackson Burns, 1903-1904
- James Skinner, 1905
- S.E. Steele, 1906
- D.O. Snyder, 1907-1908
- James Brady, 1909
- P.A. Vallandingham, 1910
- W.H. Stowasser, 1911
- W.S. King, 1911
- Jesse Green, 1912
- W.S. Hefner, 1912
- James Brady, 1913
- D. Blain Shaw, 1913
- V.G. Shipe, 1914-1919
- C.R. Miller, 1919-1920
- H.S. King, 1921
- T.W. Peyton, 1922-1923
- James Brady, 1924-1926
- P.A. Vallandingham, 1926-1927
- John W. Jackson, 1927-1928
- E.L. McCue, 1928-1929
- H.S. King, 1929-1930
- C.T. Jimison, 1930-1931
- G.E. Welch, 1931-1933
- C.C. Swann, 1933-1939
- R.W. Nelson, 1939-1941
- C.C. Swann, 1941-1943
- G.P. Vallandingham, 1943-1945
- D.B. Nelson, 1945-1947
- C.T. Jimison, 1947-1949
- Harley Townsend, 1949-1951
- G.E. Welch, 1951-1953
- G.P. Vallandingham, 1953-1955
- Jesse L. Henderson, 1955-1961
- Boyd Hash, 1961-1969, 1975-1977
- Don Owens, 1969-1971
- Emmitt Mahafey, 1971-1973
- Don Owens, 1973-1975
- Ted Kirk, 1977-1979
- Don Owens, 1979-1981
- William Rucker, 1981-1987
- Don Owens, 1987-1989
- William Plyburn, 1989-1993
- Nancy Cartmill, 1993-2001
- Paul L. Turman, Sr., 2001-2015
- Christopher L. Tatum, 2015-Present

== Geography ==
Barboursville is located at 38°24′40″N 82°17′52″W (38.411002, -82.297758). According to the United States Census Bureau, the village has a total area of 4.19 square miles (10.85 km^{2}), of which 4.09 square miles (10.59 km^{2}) is land and 0.10 square miles (0.26 km^{2}) is water. The confluence of the Mud River and the Guyandotte River is just north of the village.

== Demographics ==
Historical population
Census	Pop.	Note	%±
1860	341		—
1870	371		8.8%
1880	361		−2.7%
1900	429		—
1910	907		111.4%
1920	974		7.4%
1930	1,508		54.8%
1940	1,550		2.8%
1950	1,943		25.4%
1960	2,331		20.0%
1970	2,279		−2.2%
1980	2,871		26.0%
1990	2,774		−3.4%
2000	3,183		14.7%
2010	3,964		24.5%
2020	4,456		12.4%
U.S. Decennial Census

=== 2010 census ===
As of the census of 2010, there were 3,964 people, 1,528 households, and 904 families living in the village. The population density was 969.2 inhabitants per square mile (374.2/km^{2}). There were 1,625 housing units at an average density of 397.3 per square mile (153.4/km^{2}). The racial makeup of the village was 94.1% White, 3.1% African American, 0.2% Native American, 1.3% Asian, 0.1% from other races, and 1.2% from two or more races. Hispanic or Latino of any race were 0.7% of the population.

There were 1,528 households, of which 25.3% had children under the age of 18 living with them, 43.2% were married couples living together, 11.9% had a female householder with no husband present, 4.1% had a male householder with no wife present, and 40.8% were non-families. 36.4% of all households were made up of individuals, and 14.6% had someone living alone who was 65 years of age or older. The average household size was 2.12 and the average family size was 2.76.

The median age in the village was 38.8 years. 16.8% of residents were under the age of 18; 9.3% were between the ages of 18 and 24; 30.4% were from 25 to 44; 25.8% were from 45 to 64; and 17.5% were 65 years of age or older. The gender makeup of the village was 52.7% male and 47.3% female.

=== 2000 census ===
As of the census of 2000, there were 3,183 people, 1,365 households, and 877 families living in the village. The population density was 864.1 people per square mile (334.0/km^{2}). There were 1,465 housing units at an average density of 397.7 per square mile (153.7/km^{2}). The racial makeup of the village was 97.77% White, 0.82% African American, 0.16% Native American, 0.60% Asian, 0.06% Pacific Islander, 0.06% from other races, and 0.53% from two or more races. Hispanic or Latino of any race were 0.72% of the population.

There were 1,365 households, out of which 25.9% had children under the age of 18 living with them, 51.1% were married couples living together, 10.5% had a female householder with no husband present, and 35.7% were non-families. 31.2% of all households were made up of individuals, and 14.1% had someone living alone who was 65 years of age or older. The average household size was 2.25 and the average family size was 2.82.

In the village, the population was spread out, with 19.4% under the age of 18, 9.9% from 18 to 24, 26.1% from 25 to 44, 27.2% from 45 to 64, and 17.5% who were 65 years of age or older. The median age was 42 years. For every 100 females, there were 94.4 males. For every 100 females age 18 and over, there were 90.7 males.

The median income for a household in the village was $35,139, and the median income for a family was $45,167. Males had a median income of $32,952 versus $26,469 for females. The per capita income for the village was $19,848. About 5.4% of families and 10.0% of the population were below the poverty line, including 8.5% of those under age 18 and 7.1% of those age 65 or over.

== Economy ==
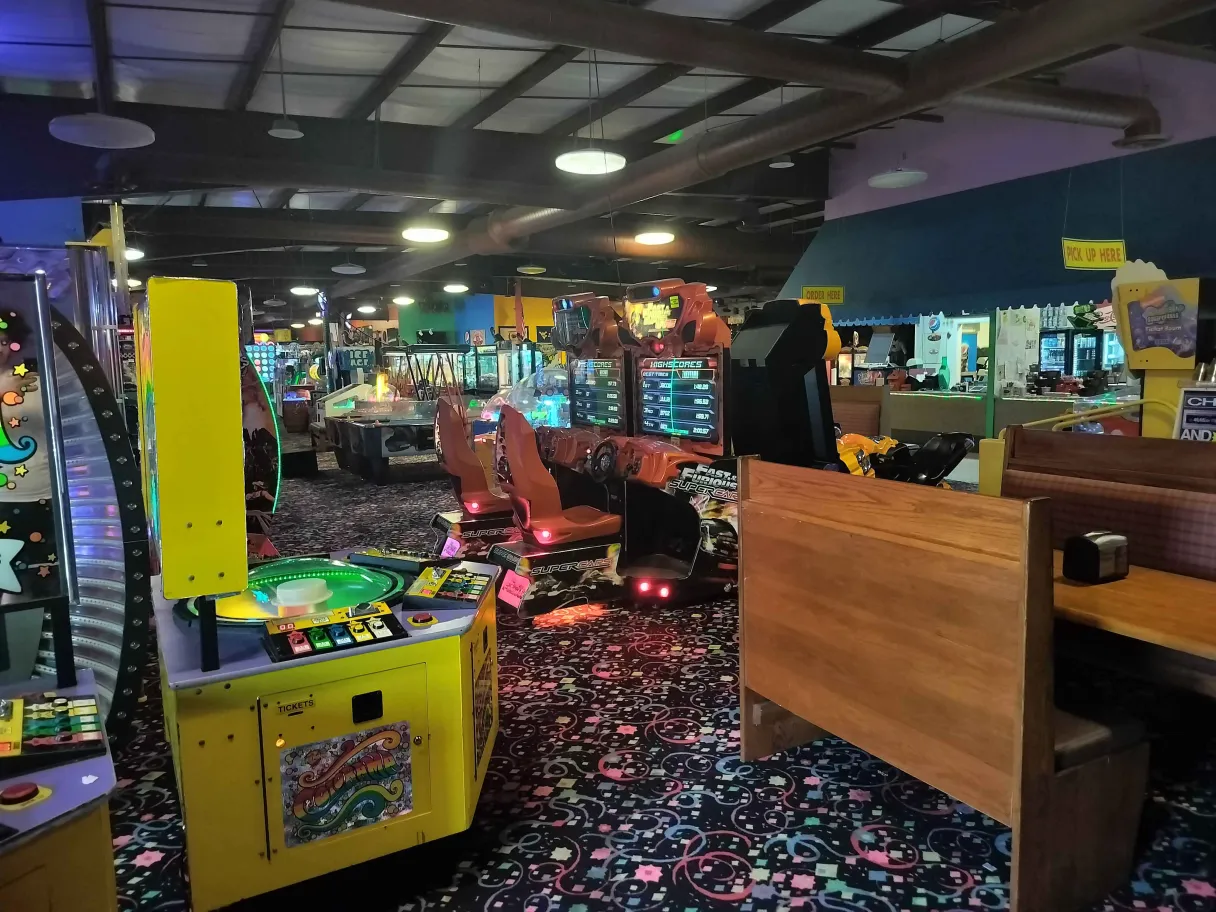
Interior of Billy Bob's Wonderland in 2024

Barboursville is home to the Huntington Mall, which is the largest indoor mall in the state of West Virginia, with more than 1.5 million square feet of retail space. Billy Bob's Wonderland is opened on the outskirts of the Mall. Another busy retail area in Barboursville is the Merritt's Creek Farm Shopping Center just off I-64 Exit 18.

There have been two recently announced major retail developments for the Barboursville area. In 2015, Interstate Realty of Bristol, Tennessee, announced plans to construct a new retail development named Tanyard Station. The development will be built on a 52-acre site that was formerly a CSX rail yard along US Route 60. It is slated to be one of the largest retail developments ever built in Cabell County with over 400,000 square feet of planned retail space. It will be home to approximately 20 restaurants and retailers, including a grocery store, hotel, bank, gas station, and many others. Since its announcement, the development has been plagued by many delays and setbacks including an endangered bat species being found on the property. To accommodate the development, US Route 60 will be widened and intersection upgrades will be made and will include installation of several new traffic lights and signals. An official groundbreaking for the development was held on October 16, 2017.

== Landmarks ==
Toll House

There is a trail through Barboursville that showcases many of its historic buildings. One such structure is an old toll house dating to the pre–Civil War era. Other landmarks include the Veterans' Home, Barboursville Elementary and Middle Schools (both schools have been rebuilt), and Barboursville Park, which serves as a popular recreation area for residents of the area.

Barboursville is located near U.S. Route 60, which follows the route of the historic Midland Trail.

The Barboursville Park is another major attraction within the Village. It encompasses more than 750 acres and has soccer and baseball fields, tennis courts, basketball courts, fishing ponds, walking trails, equestrian trails, horse show ring, and amphitheater. There is also a newly opened splash pad and plans have been announced to build a disc golf course. The U.S. Youth Soccer Region 1 Championship was held at the soccer complex within Barboursville Park in 2015 and 2016. Also hosted was the U.S. Youth Soccer Region 1 President's Cup in 2017.

Lake William in the Barboursville Park is a 17-acre impoundment located on the City Barboursville's Community Park in Cabell County. Access to the lake is by County Route 31 and 31.

== Education ==
Young people in Barboursville are educated by the schools of the Cabell County Schools. In 1994, the board consolidated most of its schools into a few large facilities. Primary education is given at Village of Barboursville Elementary, which is a consolidation of Pea Ridge Elementary and Barboursville Elementary. Martha Elementary, on Martha Rd. and Davis Creek Elementary, at 1400 Riverview Drive, are additional schools that are available to residents of Barboursville. High school students began attending Cabell Midland High School, a facility resulting from the consolidation of Barboursville High School and Milton High School, in the fall of 1994. Cabell Midland High School is in Ona, about five miles east of Barboursville.

Technical and trade education for Barboursville public school students is administered by the Cabell County Career Technology Center in Huntington; the CCCTC offers courses in automotive mechanics, HVAC, welding, nursing, and information technology. Classes are also available to adults as college-level courses. University courses are available through Marshall University and Mountwest Community and Technical College in Huntington.

== Notable people ==
- John Astle, former member of the Maryland General Assembly
- George Baumgardner, MLB pitcher
- Wayne Chapman, NFL football player and coach
- Grace Golden Clayton, originator of Father's Day
- William Hope Harvey, lawyer, author, politician, and businessman
- Brett Rowe, stock car racing driver
- Catherine Shipe East, researcher and feminist activist
- Jason Starkey, NFL player
- David A. Wiley, academic and writer
- Evan Worrell, delegate for Barboursville and father of 8
