= Wilson, West Virginia =

Wilson, West Virginia may refer to the following places in West Virginia:

- Wilson, Cabell County, West Virginia, an unincorporated community
- Wilson, Kanawha County, West Virginia, an unincorporated community
- Wilson, Maryland and West Virginia, an unincorporated community in Grant County
