= Barboursville Historic District =

Historic district in West Virginia, United States

- U.S. National Register of Historic Places
- U.S. Historic district
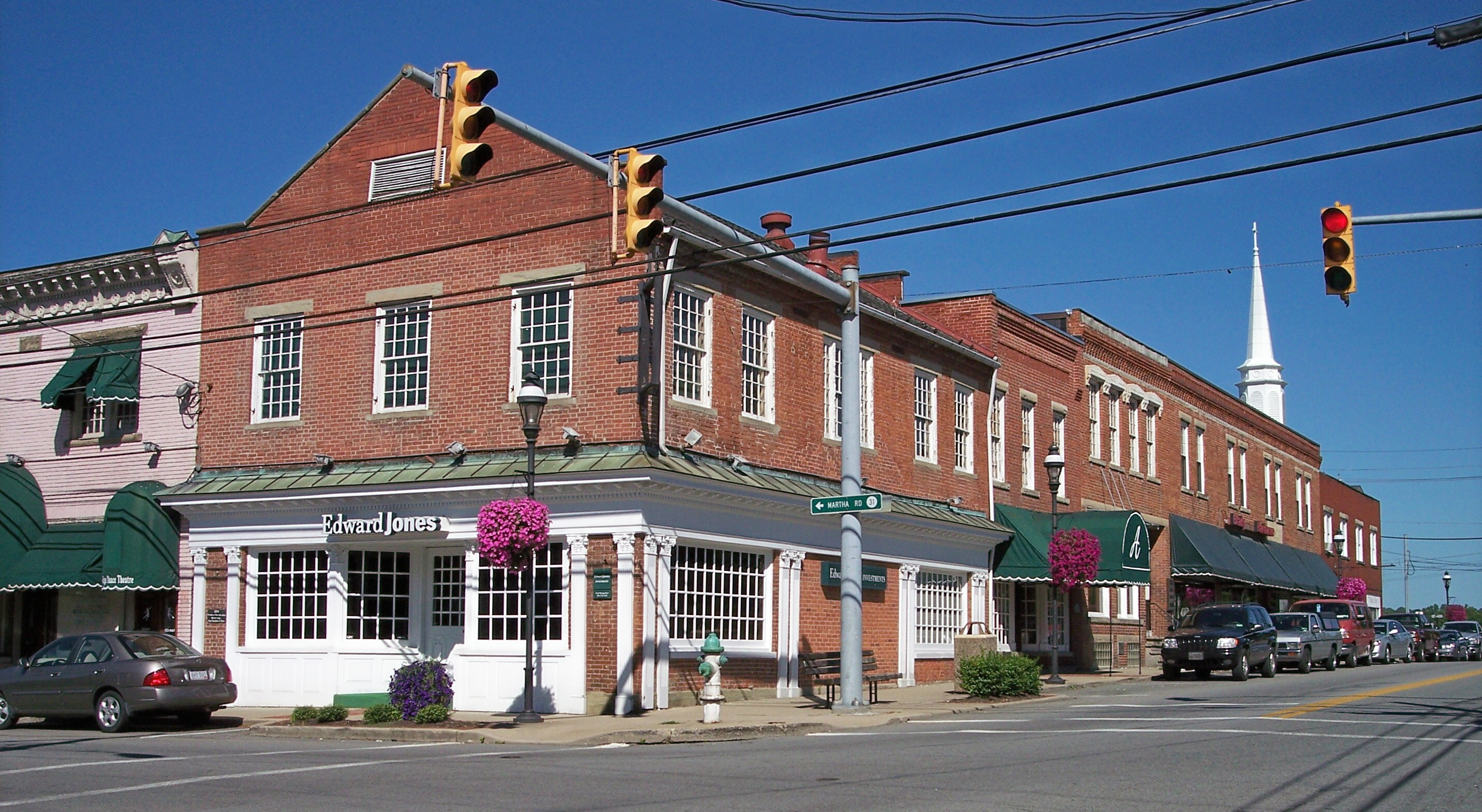
- Barboursville, West Virginia, July 2007

- Location within West Virginia Location within the United States
- Location: Water, Main, Brady Sts., and Central Ave., Barboursville, West Virginia
- Coordinates: 38°24′34″N 82°17′42″W
- Area: 2 acres (0.81 ha)
- Architectural style: Classical Revival, Early Commercial
- NRHP reference No.: 08001234
- Added to NRHP: December 24, 2008

Barboursville Historic District is a national historic district located at Barboursville, Cabell County, West Virginia. The district encompasses 20 contributing buildings in the central business district of Barboursville and mostly contains several good examples of late 19th and early 20th century commercial architecture. Notable buildings include the First United Methodist Church Parsonage (c. 1925), Brady Hardware Building (1906), First National Bank (1870), Ossie Mills General Store, Barber Shop (c. 1870), Adams Building (1950), and Miller/Thornburg Store (Edward Jones) (1854).

It was listed on the National Register of Historic Places in 2008.

== See also ==
- National Register of Historic Places listings in Cabell County, West Virginia
