= Sarah West (disambiguation) =

Sarah West may refer to:

- Sarah West (born 1972), Royal Navy officer, the first woman to be appointed to command a major warship in the Royal Navy
- Sarah West (actress) (1790–1876), British actress
- Sarah West (Prisoner character), character from the Australian TV series Prisoner portrayed by Kylie Belling

== See also ==
- Sara West, Australian actress
- Sarah, West Virginia, an unincorporated community in Cabell County, West Virginia
