= Prairietown =

Prairietown may refer to:

- Prairietown, Illinois, a community in Madison County, Illinois
- Prairietown, West Virginia, a community in Cabell County, West Virginia
