= Josh Brunty =

American digital forensics academic

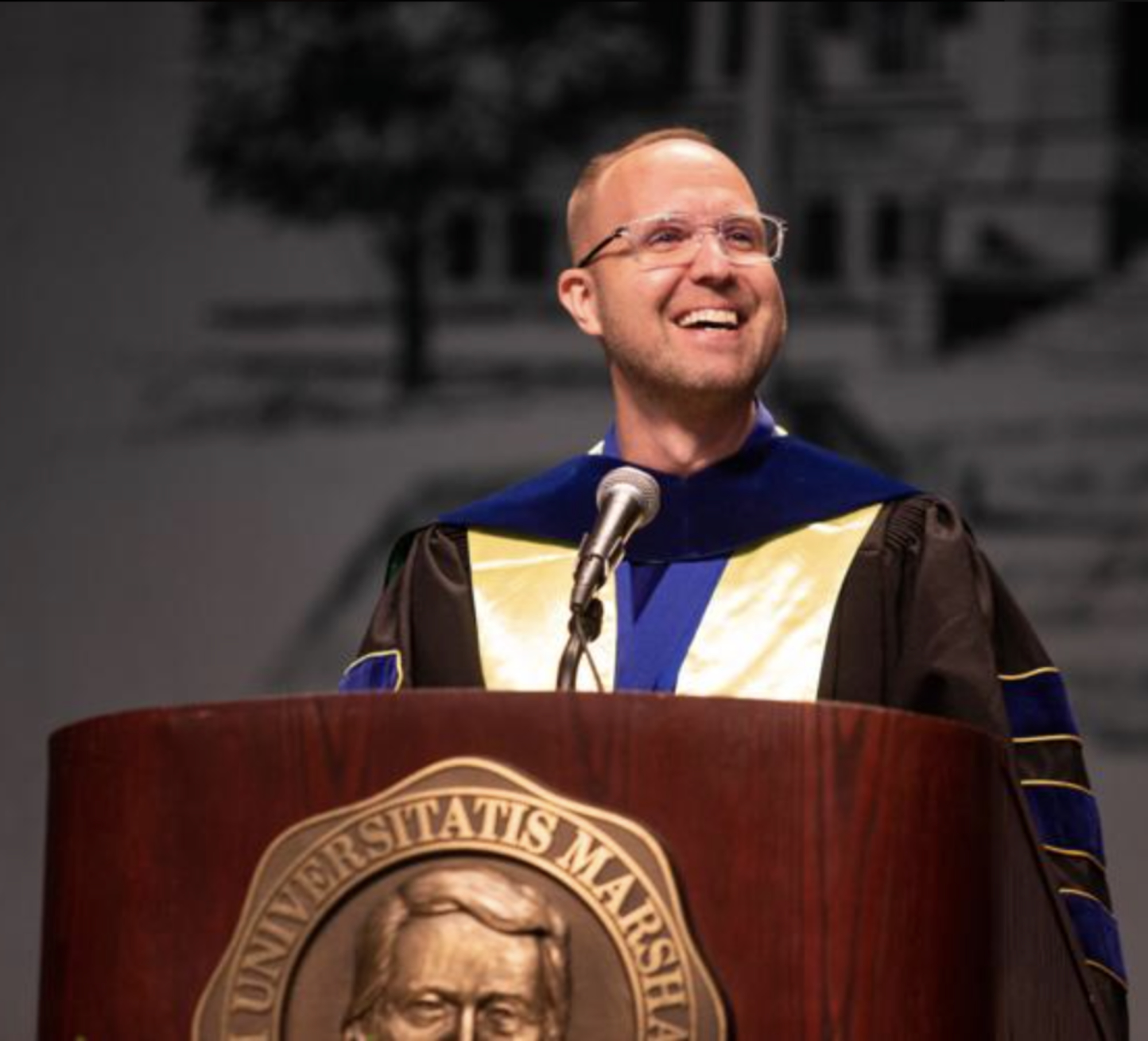
- Brunty gives the commencement speech at Marshall University's 2022 Winter Commencement Ceremony
- Born: 1982 (age 43–44); Salt Rock, WV
- Citizenship: United States
- Education: Marshall University (BA, MS); Middle Georgia State University (ScD)
- Scientific career
- Fields: Cybersecurity; Digital forensics
- Workplaces: Marshall University
- Thesis: Student Perceptions of Experiential-Based Learning Exercises in Cybersecurity Education
- Website: www.marshall.edu/cyber/profile/josh-brunty/

Josh Brunty is a Professor of Cybersecurity and Digital forensics at Marshall University in Huntington, West Virginia. He serves as head coach of the US Cyber Team for the International Cybersecurity Challenge and other international cybersecurity competitions.

== Early life ==
Brunty was born in Salt Rock, West Virginia and attended Cabell Midland High School.

== Education ==
Brunty earned his undergraduate and graduate degrees in Criminal Justice and Criminology from Marshall University. He later received his Ph.D. in Information Technology from Middle Georgia State University.

Brunty's early research as a graduate student involved the automatic verification and validation of tools. These validation practices are commonplace in many modern digital forensic tools and lab practices.

== Career ==
Prior to joining Marshall University in 2012, Brunty spent several years as a Digital Forensics Examiner and Laboratory Technical Leader in various laboratories, as well as serving on several federal and state-level cyber-crime task forces and panels.

Brunty is the author of books, book chapters, and journal publications in the fields of digital forensics, mobile device forensics, and social media investigation, including the 2012 Routledge textbook Social Media Investigation for Law Enforcement and a 2019 Journal of Forensic Sciences article on smartwatch forensics that received the American Academy of Forensic Sciences Digital and Multimedia Sciences Most Outstanding Research Award.

Brunty has served as an expert source for major media outlets on a variety of cybersecurity topics. In 2021, he was featured in NBC News discussing antivirus software, where he explained that modern operating systems have evolved to include robust built-in security protections that eliminate the need for most people to purchase additional antivirus programs. In 2022, he was quoted in El País, Spain's largest newspaper, where he discussed the evolving role of antivirus software and the importance of user behavior in cybersecurity. In 2024, he was again quoted by NBC News as an expert on mobile device forensics and law enforcement's capabilities to access encrypted devices, providing analysis following the attempted assassination of Donald Trump in Pennsylvania. In August 2026, he appeared in the first installment of Brandy Zadrozny's The Deep End, an MS NOW series on conspiracy theories and online misinformation, discussing the use of generative artificial intelligence to produce content, imagery and terminology that can appear scientifically credible to a lay audience.

Brunty is a frequent speaker at international and national cybersecurity and digital forensics conferences, and guest lectures at various universities throughout the world.
