= Jason Starkey =

American football player (born 1977)

No. 50
- Position: Center

Personal information
- Born: July 15, 1977 (age 49); Barboursville, West Virginia, U.S.
- Listed height: 6 ft 4 in (1.93 m)
- Listed weight: 290 lb (132 kg)

Career information
- High school: Cabell Midland (Ona, West Virginia)
- College: Marshall (1996–1999)
- NFL draft: 2000: undrafted

Career history
- Arizona Cardinals (2000–2003)

Awards and highlights
- NCAA I-AA national champion (1996); First-team All-MAC (1999); Second-team All-MAC (1998)

Career NFL statistics
- Games played: 34
- Games started: 9
- Stats at Pro Football Reference

Jason Starkey (born July 15, 1977) is an American former professional football player who was a center in the National Football League (NFL). He was signed by the Arizona Cardinals as an undrafted free agent in 2000 and played his entire career with the Cardinals. He played college football for the Marshall Thundering Herd.

After his retirement from the NFL, Starkey was the head football coach at Lopez High School in Brownsville, Texas, until his resignation in 2018.
