= Yates Crossing, West Virginia =

- Unincorporated community
- Location within the state of West Virginia Yates Crossing (the United States)
- Coordinates: 38°26′29.31″N 82°11′23.52″W
- Country: United States
- State: West Virginia
- County: Cabell
- Elevation: 584 ft (178 m)
- Time zone: UTC-5 (Eastern (EST))
  - Summer (DST): UTC-4 (EDT)
- ZIP codes: 25701
- GNIS ID: 1549445

Yates Crossing is an unincorporated community in Cabell County, West Virginia, United States.
