= Reid, West Virginia =

- Unincorporated community
- Location within the state of West Virginia Reid (the United States)
- Coordinates: 38°24′5″N 82°23′18″W
- Country: United States
- State: West Virginia
- County: Cabell
- Elevation: 630 ft (190 m)
- Time zone: UTC-5 (Eastern (EST))
  - Summer (DST): UTC-4 (EDT)
- GNIS ID: 1740383

Reid was an unincorporated community in Cabell County, West Virginia, United States.
