= Thornburg House =

Historic house in West Virginia, United States

- U.S. National Register of Historic Places
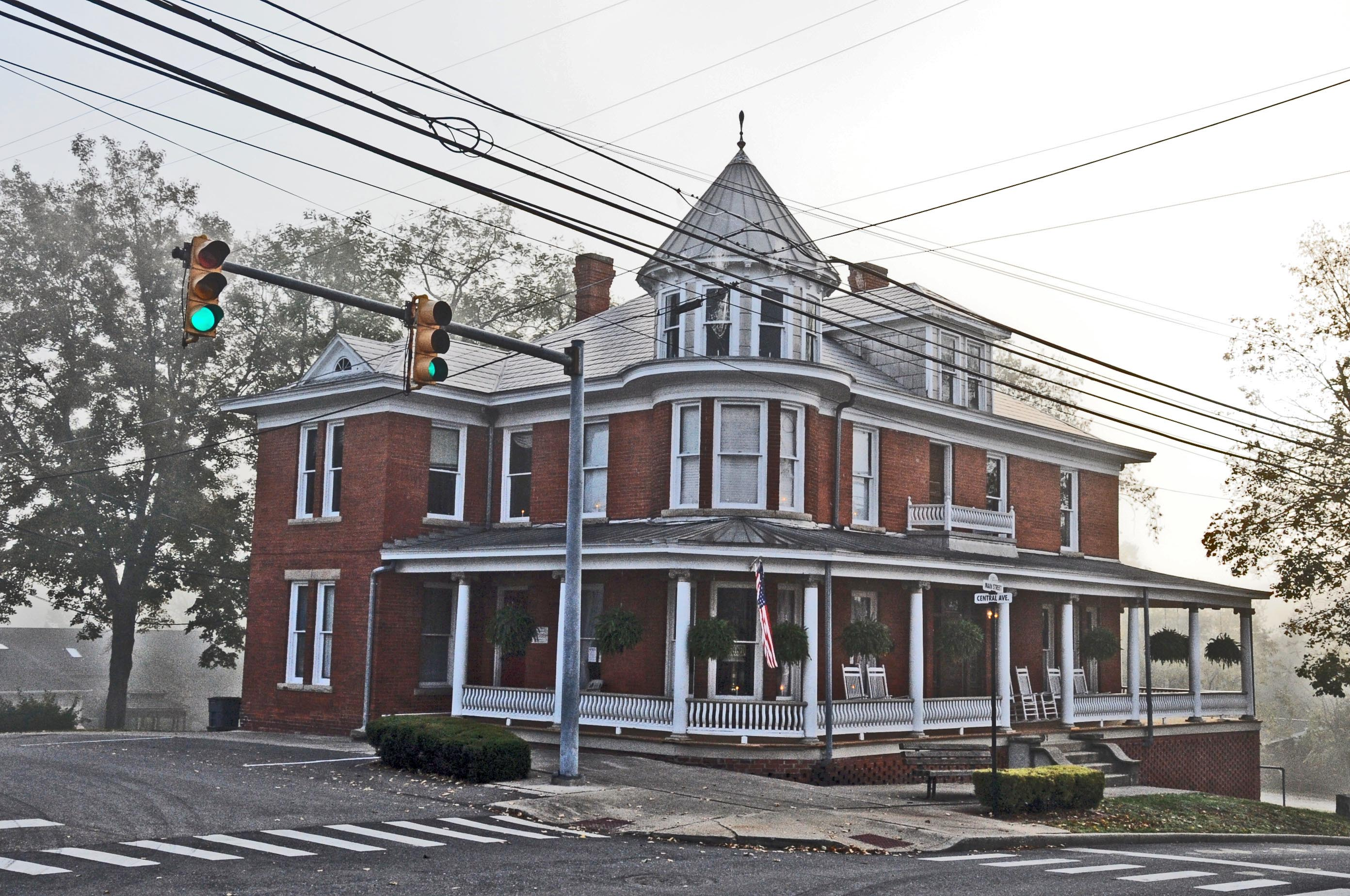

- Location within West Virginia Location within the United States
- Location: 700 Main St., Barboursville, West Virginia
- Coordinates: 38°24′35″N 82°17′40″W
- Area: 0.5 acres (0.20 ha)
- Built: 1901
- Architectural style: Colonial Revival, Queen Anne
- NRHP reference No.: 91000451
- Added to NRHP: April 25, 1991

Thornburg House is a historic home located at Barboursville, West Virginia, United States. It was built in 1901, and is a two-story brick and frame dwelling with irregular massing, varied roof shapes, and large porches in the Queen Anne style. It features a corner turret with a pointed roof and a wraparound porch. Also on the property is a contributing privy.

It was listed on the National Register of Historic Places in 1991.

== See also ==
- National Register of Historic Places listings in Cabell County, West Virginia
