= J. J. Roberts (American football) =

American football player (born 2001)

No. 36 – Tampa Bay Buccaneers
- Position: Safety
- Roster status: Practice squad

Personal information
- Born: September 22, 2001 (age 25); Hurricane, West Virginia, U.S.
- Listed height: 6 ft 0 in (1.83 m)
- Listed weight: 195 lb (88 kg)

Career information
- High school: Cabell Midland (Ona, West Virginia)
- College: Wake Forest (2020–2022); Marshall (2023–2024)
- NFL draft: 2025: undrafted

Career history
- Tampa Bay Buccaneers (2025–present)

Awards and highlights
- First-team All-Sun Belt (2024)

Career NFL statistics as of Week 5, 2026
- Games played: 1
- Stats at Pro Football Reference

J. J. Roberts (born September 22, 2001) is an American professional football safety for the Tampa Bay Buccaneers of the National Football League (NFL). He played college football for the Wake Forest Demon Deacons and Marshall Thundering Herd.

== Early life ==
Roberts attended Cabell Midland High School in Ona, West Virginia. As a senior playing both quarterback and defensive back, Roberts passed for 360 yards and four touchdowns, while rushing for 1,426 yards and 23 scores, while on defense, he recorded 48 tackles and three interceptions, being named the West Virginia Gatorade Player of the Year. A three-star recruit, he committed to play college football at Wake Forest University.

== College career ==
After playing sparingly in 2020, Roberts appeared in 14 games in 2021, totaling 21 tackles, two forced fumbles, three pass breakups, and an interception. Following the 2022 season, he transferred to Marshall University to play for the Marshall Thundering Herd. In his first season with Marshall, Roberts tallied 73 tackles, two interceptions, and a forced fumble. In his final collegiate season, he finished with 94 total tackles. After the conclusion of the 2024 season, Roberts declared for the 2025 NFL draft and accepted an invite to the 2025 Hula Bowl.

== Professional career ==
Pre-draft measurables
Height	Weight	Arm length	Hand span	Wingspan	40-yard dash	10-yard split	20-yard split	20-yard shuttle	Three-cone drill	Vertical jump	Broad jump	Bench press
5 ft 11 in (1.80 m)	192 lb (87 kg)	31 1/2 in (0.80 m)	8 7/8 in (0.23 m)	6 ft 3 1/2 in (1.92 m)	4.41 s	1.46 s	2.56 s	4.11 s	6.76 s	40.5 in (1.03 m)	10 ft 6 in (3.20 m)	20 reps
All values from Pro Day

Following Robert's participation in Marshall's Pro Day, his draft stock improved. Roberts signed with the Tampa Bay Buccaneers as an undrafted free agent on May 9, 2025. He was placed on injured reserve on August 18.

On August 30, 2026, Roberts was waived by the Buccaneers as a part of final roster cuts; he was re-signed to the team's practice squad the following day.
