= Hodges, West Virginia =

- Unincorporated community

- Location within the state of West Virginia Hodges (the United States)
- Coordinates: 38°21′45″N 82°25′44″W
- Country: United States
- State: West Virginia
- County: Cabell
- Elevation: 699 ft (213 m)
- Time zone: UTC-5 (Eastern (EST))
  - Summer (DST): UTC-4 (EDT)
- GNIS ID: 1540332

Hodges is an unincorporated community in Cabell County, West Virginia, United States.
