= Geefwee Boedoe =

American animator and illustrator

Jeffrey Border, known professionally as Geefwee Boedoe, sometimes credited as Gee Fwee Boedoe, is an American animator and illustrator.

== Career ==
Geefwee Boedoe first worked as an animator for Disney and Pixar, collaborating on movies like Monsters, Inc., where he did the main title design, Finding Nemo, The Hunchback of Notre Dame and Beauty and the Beast. He is sometimes credited as Gee Fwee Boedoe. Some of his work was shown in a travelling Pixar exposition, and in the book "The Art of Finding Nemo".

He wrote and illustrated his first book, Arrowville, published by Laura Geringer and HarperCollins, in 2004. It is a book for 4- to 8-year-olds in the vein of Dr. Seuss.

== Accolades and awards ==
Arrowville was selected as one of the 10 best illustrated children's books of 2004 by The New York Times Book Review, and won the 2004 Reuben Award for Book Illustration from the National Cartoonists Society.

His animated short film Let's Pollute was nominated for an Academy Award (Oscar) for an Oscar for the Best Short Film, Animated category.
