= Let's Pollute =

Let's Pollute!
- Poster for Let's Pollute
- Directed by: Geefwee Boedoe
- Produced by: Geefwee Boedoe; Joel Bloom
- Narrated by: Jim Thornton
- Edited by: Torbin Bullock
- Release date: November 2009 (Orlando Film Festival)
- Running time: 6.5 minutes
- Country: United States
- Language: English

Let's Pollute! is a 2009 animated short film created by Geefwee Boedoe. The film is a modern satire decrying pollution, waste and consumerism, animated in a fifties educational film style.

== Plot ==
After a brief history of the pollution imperative from before the Industrial Revolution to the present, the film follows a nuclear family polluting its way through an average day. The narrator explains that pollution is a critical part of our culture and keeps our economy strong. The film connects our wasteful, selfish habits with consumerism and its ally, big business. The resulting out-of-control pollution of the air, water and land is displayed in scenes of dismal destruction overlaid with happy music and cheerful calls by the narrator to pollute more for a better tomorrow.

== Production ==
"Let's Pollute!" took more than three years to complete, primarily in the home studio of filmmaker Geefwee Boedoe. Boedoe wrote, directed, animated and produced the film with animation help from Tim Crawfurd and post-production help from a small team of mostly volunteers.

In keeping with the 1950s style, the animation is very graphic and flat, while gritty textures underscore the pollution theme. Also in keeping with the techniques of that era and his own background of hand-drawn animation, Boedoe drew all the line work on paper with a black lithographic pencil and created the textures primarily with India ink on plastic sheets, rather than computer synthetic effects. He sketched out storyboards with pencil and paper and scanned them and artwork into his computer for editing.

== Music ==
Much of the film's score is pre-recorded tracks by French musician Roger Roger. Two original tunes, composed by Geefwee Boedoe and performed by a group of his musician friends, are also on the soundtrack.

== Reception and awards ==
"Let's Pollute!" was nominated for an Oscar for Best Short Film, Animated, by the Academy of Motion Picture Arts and Sciences (AMPAS). This is the first Academy Award nomination for Geefwee Boedoe. Let's Pollute! also took the Silver SpIFFy in the animated film category at the Spokane International Film Festival, the Big Muddy Film Festival and the Orlando Film Festival.
