= Cabell County Courthouse =

United States historic place in Huntington, West Virginia

- U.S. National Register of Historic Places
- The courthouse in 2015

- Location within West Virginia Location within the United States
- Interactive map showing the location of Cabell County Courthouse
- Location: 5th Ave. and 8th St., Huntington, West Virginia
- Coordinates: 38°25′11″N 82°26′47″W
- Built: 1899
- Architect: Stewart, James B.; Et al.
- Architectural style: Beaux Arts
- NRHP reference No.: 82004313
- Added to NRHP: September 02, 1982

The Cabell County Courthouse in Huntington, West Virginia was built in the Beaux-Arts Classical style in 1899. Originally designed by Gunn and Curtis of Kansas City, and has been expanded in several phases. The construction of the courthouse was supervised by local Huntington architect James B. Stewart.

== See also ==
- Cabell County, West Virginia
- National Register of Historic Places listings in Cabell County, West Virginia
