= Ona Speedway =

Motorsport track in the United States

"Where Legends Are Born"
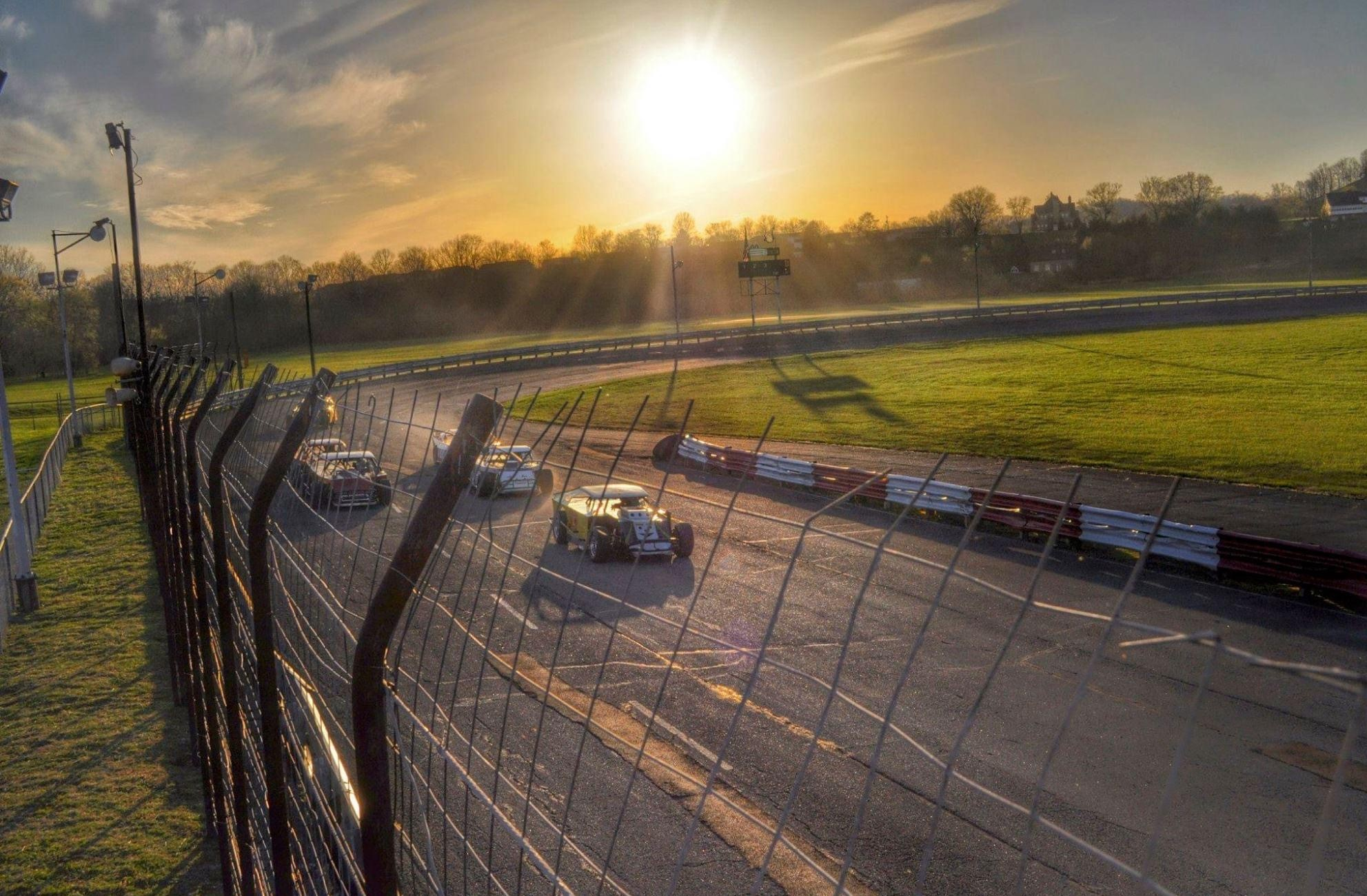
- Cars racing at Ona Speedway in 2020
- Location: 2674 Prichard Road, Ona, West Virginia 25545
- Coordinates: 38.43927°N 82.20099°W
- Capacity: 3,000-5,000
- Owner: Ona Land Management Services, LLC
- Operator: TK Promotions
- Broke ground: 1962
- Opened: 1963
- Construction cost: $750,000 (1962)
- Architect: J.H Milam Inc.
- Former names: West Virginia International Speedway (1963–1969); International Raceway Park (1970–1976)

Oval Track
- Surface: Asphalt
- Length: 0.437 mi (0.704 km)
- Turns: 4
- Banking: Turns: 13° Straights: 4°
- Race lap record: 0:16.40 (96.15 mph) (Charlie Perry, Perry Racing, 1997, Open Wheel Modified)
- Race lap record: 0:17.40 (90.41 mph) (Larry Dickson, Vollstedt Racing, 1969, USAC Sprint Car)
- Race lap record: 0:18.20 (84.05 mph) (Bobby Allison, Melvin Joseph, 1971, NASCAR Winston Cup)

Ona Airpark
- IATA: none; ICAO: none; FAA LID: 12V

Summary
- Airport type: Public
- Owner: Private
- Serves: Huntington–Ashland metropolitan area
- Location: Ona, West Virginia
- Elevation AMSL: 550 ft (170 m)
- Coordinates: 38°26′32.0483″N 082°12′33.0133″W
- Interactive map of Ona Airpark

Runways
Direction	Length		Surface
Direction	ft	m	Surface
7/25	3,154	961	Concrete
- Source: Federal Aviation Administration

Ona Speedway is a 0.437 mi (0.704 km) oval short track venue located in Ona, West Virginia. Ona Speedway is known for being the only paved oval race track in West Virginia and hosting NASCAR Cup Series races in 1963, 1964, 1970, & 1971. It is located adjacent to the Ona Airpark (FAA LID: 12V), a privately owned airport opened in September 1987, between the cities of Huntington and Charleston. Four NASCAR Cup Series races were held at the track in the 1960s and 1970s.

== Track history ==
=== 1960s ===
Constructed in 1962 by West Virginia Sports and Motor Speedway Inc at a cost of $750,000, the track was phase 1 of a larger project that would include a 1.375-mile superspeedway and football field. The track hosted two NASCAR Cup Series races in the 1960s. The 1963 Mountaineer 300 was held on August 18, 1963, with an attendance of 16,000. The 300 lap race was won by Fred Lorenzen. The 1964 Mountaineer 500 was held on August 16, 1964, with an attendance of 12,000. The 500 lap race was won by Richard Petty. During the race pieces of the pavement cracked and became displaced causing complaints from many of the drivers. Other notable drivers who raced at the track include Junior Johnson, Ned Jarrett, Jim Paschal, David Pearson, Wendell Scott, Buck Baker, and Joe Weatherly. In 1965 NASCAR did not return to Ona and the planned 1.375-mile superspeedway was canceled. A denied direct-access interstate ramp was partly blamed along with declining attendance, low driver payout, and the pavement issue during the 1964 race. The track continued to operate with local racing until it was purchased by entertainer Dick Clark and the Lashinsky brothers in 1969.

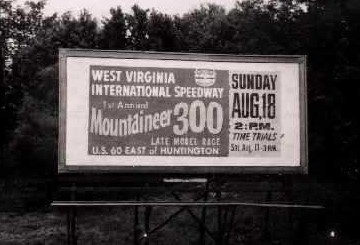
1963 Mountaineer 300 Billboard

==== Unbuilt superspeedway ====
The West Virginia Superspeedway was planned to be 1.375 miles in length with 32° banked corners, 12° straits, and 40ft wide racing surface. It was planned to be a tri-oval layout with a 30,000 seating capacity, a football field between pit road and the front stretch grandstands, and a pit area large enough to serve 50 cars. The track was expected to be similar to Darlington Raceway in terms of speed and fan attendance. The original backstretch wall was built with the short track and still stands today.

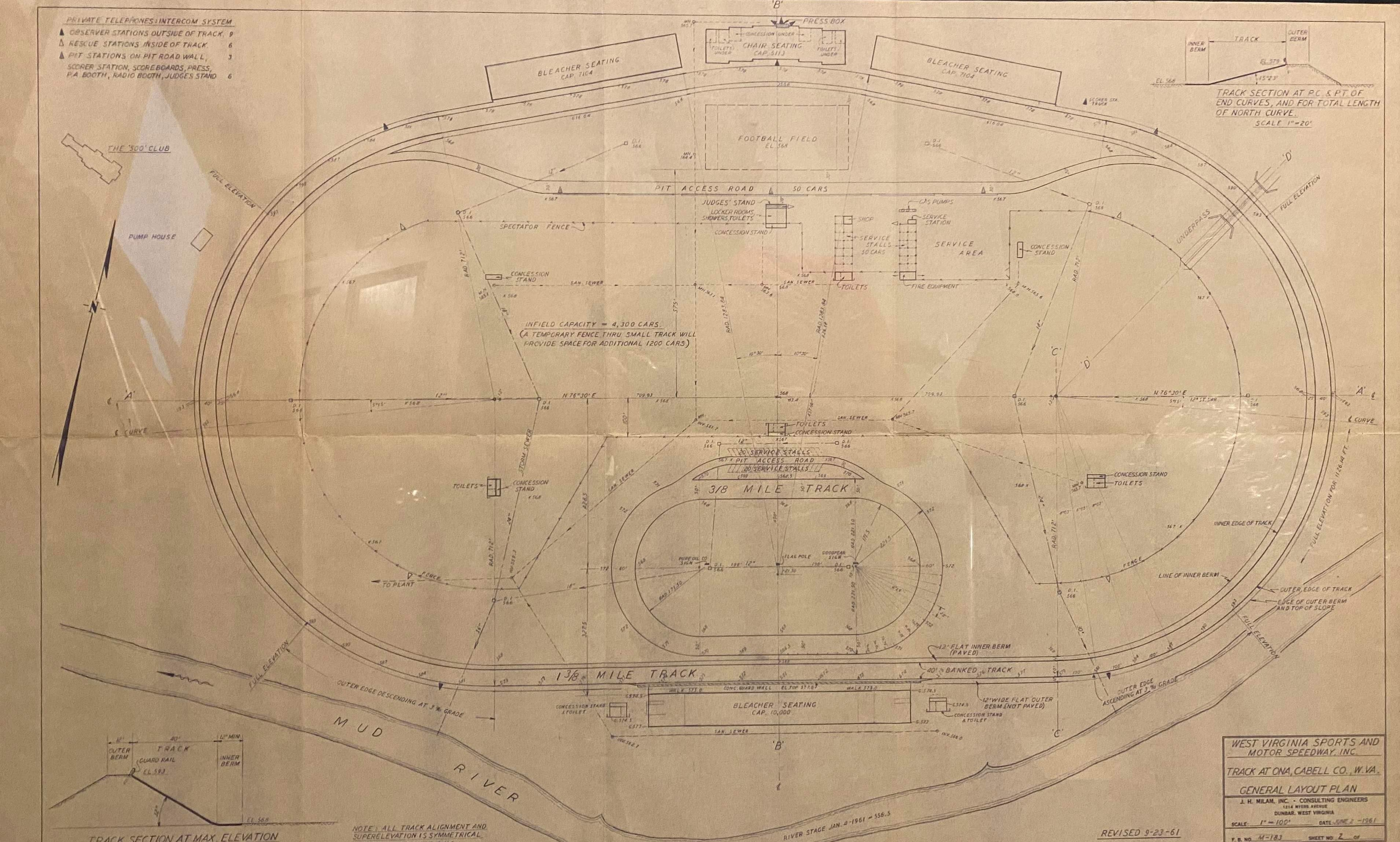
Blueprint of the planned Ona, WV Motorsports Park

=== 1970s ===
The track hosted two NASCAR Cup Series races in the 1970s and became a local concert venue. On June 12, 1970, it hosted the "Summers On Festival" with bands Grand Funk Railroad, Zephyr, Bloodrock, Heavy Rain, and Quiet. The 1970 West Virginia 300 was held on August 11, 1970, with an attendance of 8,600. The 300 lap race was won by Richard Petty. During the race the track lighting system went out leaving drivers in the dark as the cars did not have headlights. The 1971 West Virginia 500 was held on August 8, 1971, with an attendance of 10,000. The 500 lap race was won by Richard Petty. Other notable drivers who raced at the track in the 1970s include James Hylton, Dave Marcis, Cecil Gordon, Elmo Langley, Ron Keselowski, Bobby Isaac, Bobby Allison, Buddy Baker, and Benny Parsons. The track shut down in 1976 after financial trouble after removal from the NASCAR schedule.

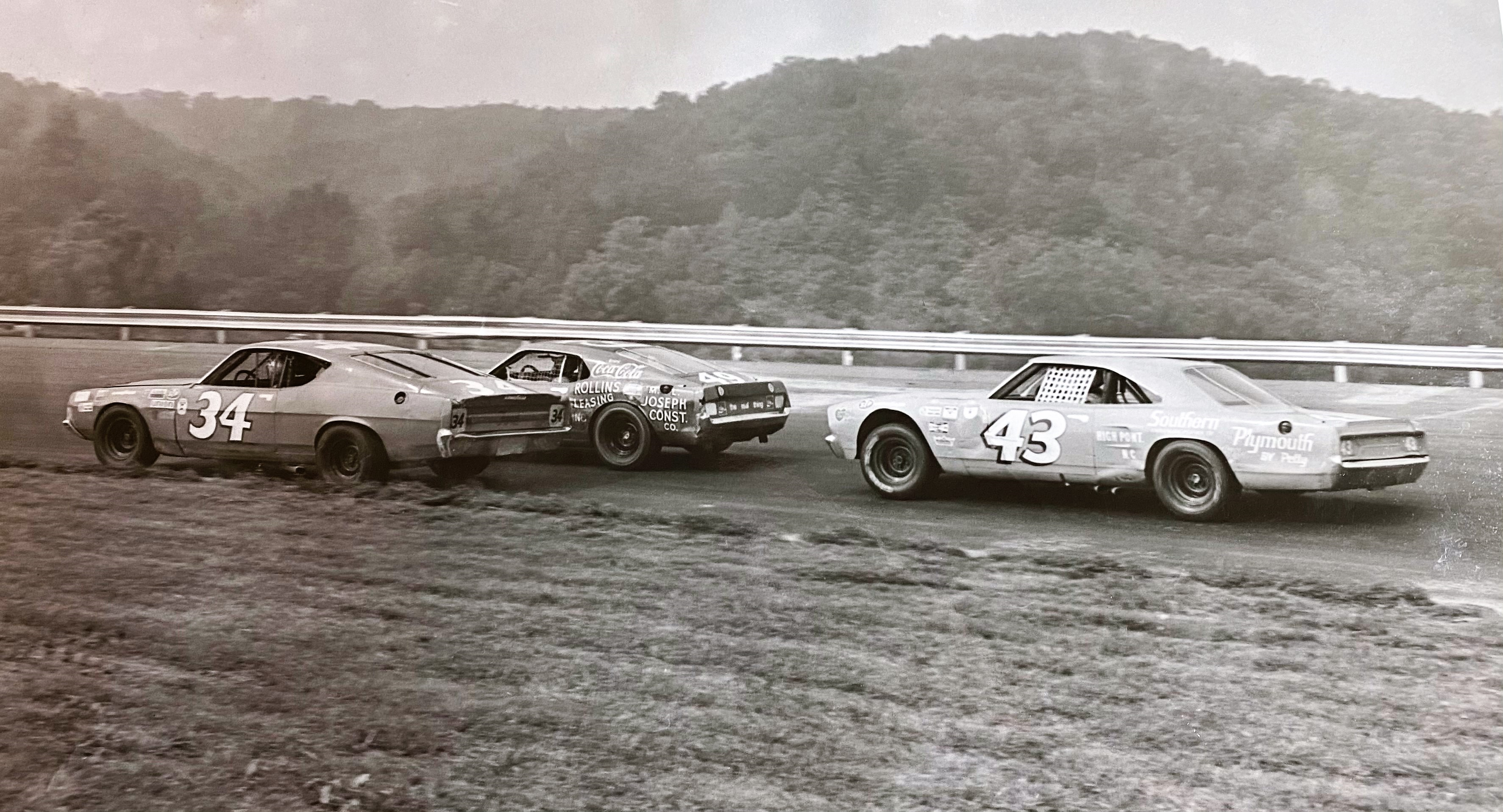
Wendell Scott, Bobby Allison, and Richard Petty at Ona Speedway in 1971.

=== 1980s ===
The track sat dormant with no known races held at the facility. The adjacent Ona Airpark was completed and opened in 1987.

=== 1990s ===
In 1995, the track was repaved and reopened by Donnie Chapman. The track record of 16.40 was set by Charlie Perry racing an open-wheel modified in 1997. On June 28, 1997, the track hosted Nascar Drivers Ernie Irvan, Sterling Marlin, Kenny Wallace and Jeremy Mayfield.

On July 18, 1998 Cale Yarborough, David Pearson, Harry Gant, Buddy Baker and Bobby Allison raced trucks in a special exhibition race.

The track continued to host with weekly racing throughout the decade.

=== 2000s ===
On June 7, 2003, the track hosted NASCAR drivers Michael Waltrip, Sterling Marlin, Jeff Green, and Kenny Wallace. The Orange County Choppers also were in attendance. In 2007 the track hosted NASCAR drivers Dale Earnhardt Jr., Sterling Marlin, Martin Truex Jr., Kenny Wallace, and Clint Bowyer

=== 2010s ===
The track continued operating, hosting bi-weekly stock car racing. Classes of cars raced include Late Models, Modifieds, Legends, Hobby Stocks, and UCAR.

=== 2020s ===
The track is currently operating, hosting regular stock car racing. Classes of cars raced include Late Models, Modifieds, Legends, Hobby Stocks, UCAR, and Crown Vics.

In 2023 the track leaned heavily into its heritage and special-event identity, culminating in the 60th anniversary season.

In 2025 A kids "juice box" class was added allowing kids the opportunity to race on the frontstretch in electric powered cars.

In 2025 the track made a significant physical investment with a partial repave, replacing portions of the roughly 30-year-old racing surface. The front stretch, turn 2, and latter half of the backstretch received new asphalt, creating a unique racing surface as drivers transition from high grip to low grip surfaces.

== See also ==
- List of airports in West Virginia
- Transportation in Huntington, West Virginia
