= Cabell County, West Virginia =

County in West Virginia, United States

- County
- Cabell County Courthouse

- Location within the U.S. state of West Virginia
- Coordinates: 38°25′N 82°14′W
- Country: United States
- State: West Virginia
- Founded: January 2, 1809
- Named for: William H. Cabell
- Seat: Huntington
- Largest city: Huntington

Area
  - Total: 288 sq mi (750 km^{2})
  - Land: 281 sq mi (730 km^{2})
  - Water: 7.0 sq mi (18 km^{2}) 2.4%

Population (2020)
  - Total: 94,350
  - Estimate (2025): 91,183 ▼
  - Density: 336/sq mi (130/km^{2})
- Time zone: UTC−5 (Eastern)
  - Summer (DST): UTC−4 (EDT)
- Congressional district: 1st
- Website: www.cabellcounty.org

Cabell County is a county located in the U.S. state of West Virginia. As of the 2020 census, the population was 94,350, making it West Virginia's fourth most-populous county. Its county seat is Huntington. The county was organized in 1809 and named for William H. Cabell, the Governor of Virginia from 1805 to 1808. Cabell County is part of the Huntington–Ashland, WV–KY–OH Metropolitan Statistical Area.

== History ==
Cabell County was created by an act of the Virginia General Assembly on January 2, 1809, out of Kanawha County. The county was named in honor of William H. Cabell, who served as Governor of Virginia from 1805 to 1808.

=== First Inhabitants ===
Many of the first inhabitants in Cabell County were the Mound Builders. More specifically, the Adena people. Later, many Hurons occupied the area until they were driven out by the Iroquois Confederacy. By the 1700s the area of Cabell County was mostly used as hunting grounds by the indigenous populations in the area.

=== European settlement ===
The first European to set foot in present-day Cabell County was most likely Robert Cavelier de La Salle, who sailed down the Ohio River in 1669. The first English explorers were probably Thomas Batts and Robert Fallam, who explored the area in September 1671. While they explored the area, they found tree markings with the letters MANI and MA, signifying to them that other Englishmen that been there before.

The Savage Grant of 1772 was made to John Savage and 60 others for service during the French and Indian War. William Buffington purchased lot 42 of this grant and willed it to his two sons, Thomas and William Buffington. Thomas and his brother Jonathan came to present-day Cabell County in 1796 and found Thomas Hannon. Hannon is regarded as the first settler in Cabell County.

=== 1800s ===
Cabell County's location along the Ohio River made it a natural resting place and port for westward travelers. Areas such as Guyandotte and Holderby's Landing (present-day Huntington) became ferrying points. The James River and Kanawha Turnpike was extended to Barboursville in 1814. In 1837, Marshall Academy was formed at Holdby's Landing. The school was named after Chief Justice John Marshall, a friend of local lawyer John Laidley. The academy was incorporated in 1838 by the Virginia State Legislature. In 1867, Marshall Academy was created as the State Normal School of Marshall College to train teachers. Marshall College gained University status in 1961.

=== Civil War ===
Prior to the outbreak of conflict, the citizens of Cabell County were largely divided on the issue secession. The arrival of Eli Thayer and his Ceredo Experiment caused an uproar in the county. After the election of Abraham Lincoln as President of the United States, a militia was formed called the Border Rangers led by Albert Gallatin Jenkins. The first engagement of the Civil War in Cabell County was the Battle of Barboursville in 1861. Later that same year, the town of Guyandotte was raided and eventually burned by the Union Army. The county's economy suffered greatly after the burning of Guyandotte, but the proximity to the Ohio River and arrival of the railroad boasted the county. On June 20, 1863 when West Virginia was admitted to the Union, Cabell county, became part of West Virginia. In 1871, railroad magnate Collis P. Huntington laid out and founded the city of Huntington, near Holdby's Landing, as the western terminus of the C&O Railroad.

=== 1900s ===
Several industries entered Cabell County as a result of the establishment of Huntington. This influx of industry boast the economy, which saw a boom period until the Ohio River Flood of 1937. Huntington saw the introduction of the state's first radio station in 1923 and the state's first television station in 1949. The construction of Interstate 64 in the 1960s also saw a growth in the local economy.

== Geography ==
According to the United States Census Bureau, the county has an area of 288 square miles (750 km^{2}), of which 281 square miles (730 km^{2}) is land and 7.0 square miles (18 km^{2}) (2.4%) is water.

In 1863, West Virginia's counties were divided into civil townships, with the intention of encouraging local government. This proved impractical in the heavily rural state, and in 1872 the townships were converted into magisterial districts. Cabell County was divided into five districts: Barboursville, Grant, Guyandotte, McComas, and Union. Two additional districts, Gideon and Kyle, were established between 1920 and 1930. Between 1980 and 1990, the county was redivided into five districts: District 1, District 2, District 3, District 4, and District 5. The names and boundaries of the historic districts were preserved in the form of tax and assessment districts.

=== Major highways ===
- Interstate 64
- U.S. Route 52
- U.S. Route 60
- West Virginia Route 2
- West Virginia Route 10
- West Virginia Route 152
- West Virginia Route 527

=== Adjacent counties ===
- Gallia County, Ohio (north)
- Mason County (northeast)
- Putnam County (east)
- Lincoln County (southeast)
- Wayne County (southwest)
- Lawrence County, Ohio (northwest)

== Demographics ==
Historical population
Census	Pop.	Note	%±
1810	2,717		—
1820	4,789		76.3%
1830	5,884		22.9%
1840	8,163		38.7%
1850	6,299		−22.8%
1860	8,020		27.3%
1870	6,429		−19.8%
1880	13,744		113.8%
1890	23,595		71.7%
1900	29,252		24.0%
1910	46,685		59.6%
1920	65,746		40.8%
1930	90,786		38.1%
1940	97,459		7.4%
1950	108,035		10.9%
1960	108,202		0.2%
1970	106,918		−1.2%
1980	106,835		−0.1%
1990	96,827		−9.4%
2000	96,784		0.0%
2010	96,319		−0.5%
2020	94,350		−2.0%
2025 (est.)	91,183	▼	−3.4%
U.S. Decennial Census; 1790–1960 1900–1990; 1990–2000 2010–2020

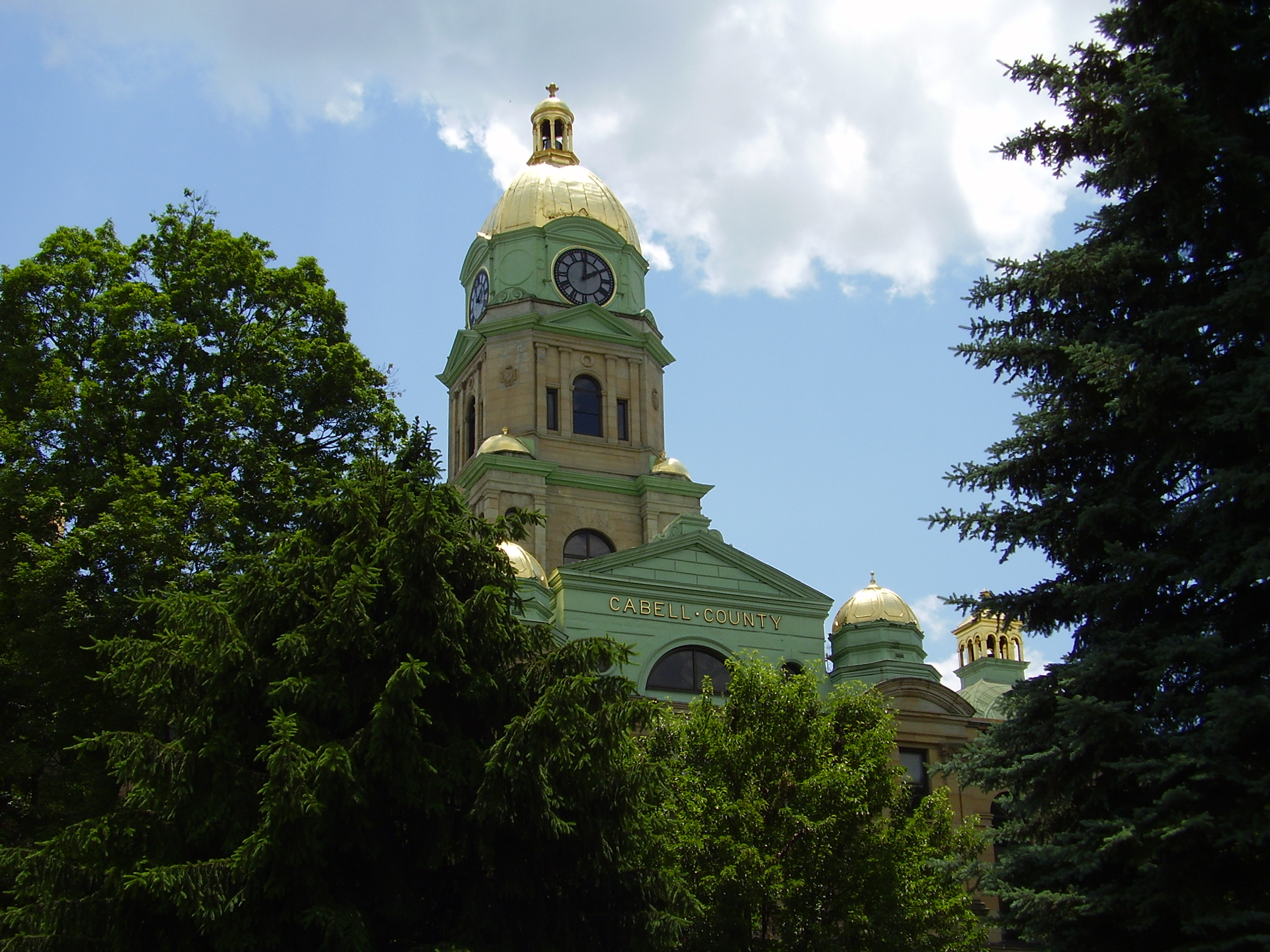
The Cabell County Court House in Huntington, the building that houses most of the county's administrative offices.

=== 2020 census ===
As of the 2020 census, the county had a population of 94,350. Of the residents, 19.0% were under the age of 18 and 19.3% were 65 years of age or older; the median age was 39.8 years. For every 100 females there were 95.2 males, and for every 100 females age 18 and over there were 92.7 males. 78.0% of residents lived in urban areas and 22.0% lived in rural areas.

The racial makeup of the county was 87.6% White, 5.1% Black or African American, 0.2% American Indian and Alaska Native, 1.4% Asian, 0.7% from some other race, and 4.9% from two or more races. Hispanic or Latino residents of any race comprised 1.7% of the population.

There were 39,921 households in the county; 41.3% were married couples living together, 31.5% had a female householder with no spouse or partner present, and 18.4% had a male householder with no spouse present. 24.9% had children under the age of 18 living with them, about 34.1% were made up of individuals, and 13.4% had someone living alone who was 65 years of age or older.

The average household and family size was 2.87.

There were 46,125 housing units, of which 13.5% were vacant. Among occupied housing units, 60.5% were owner-occupied and 39.5% were renter-occupied. The homeowner vacancy rate was 2.9% and the rental vacancy rate was 11.8%.

The median income for a household in the county was $56,415 and the poverty rate was 21.1%.

Cabell County, West Virginia – Racial and ethnic composition Note: the US Census treats Hispanic/Latino as an ethnic category. This table excludes Latinos from the racial categories and assigns them to a separate category. Hispanics/Latinos may be of any race.
Race / Ethnicity (NH = Non-Hispanic)	Pop 2000	Pop 2010	Pop 2020	% 2000	% 2010	% 2020
White alone (NH)	89,944	87,520	82,095	92.93%	90.58%	87.01%
Black or African American alone (NH)	4,118	4,717	4,751	4.25%	4.89%	5.03%
Native American or Alaska Native alone (NH)	166	209	185	0.17%	0.21%	0.19%
Asian alone (NH)	743	931	1,328	0.76%	0.96%	1.40%
Pacific Islander alone (NH)	34	21	20	0.03%	0.02%	0.02%
Other race alone (NH)	78	77	298	0.08%	0.07%	0.31%
Mixed race or Multiracial (NH)	1,047	1,798	4,111	1.08%	1.86%	4.35%
Hispanic or Latino (any race)	654	1,046	1,562	0.67%	1.08%	1.65%
Total	96,784	96,319	94,350	100.00%	100.00%	100.00%

=== 2010 census ===
As of the 2010 United States census, there were 96,319 people, 41,223 households, and 24,308 families living in the county. The population density was 342.8 inhabitants per square mile (132.4/km^{2}). There were 46,169 housing units at an average density of 164.3 per square mile (63.4/km^{2}). The racial makeup of the county was 91.6% white, 5.0% black or African American, 1.0% Asian, 0.2% American Indian, 0.3% from other races, and 2.0% from two or more races. Those of Hispanic or Latino origin made up 1.1% of the population. In terms of ancestry, 17.2% were Irish, 16.5% were English, 15.9% were German, and 10.7% were American.

Of the 41,223 households, 26.1% had children under the age of 18 living with them, 42.3% were married couples living together, 12.3% had a female householder with no husband present, 41.0% were non-families, and 33.5% of all households were made up of individuals. The average household size was 2.24 and the average family size was 2.85. The median age was 38.7 years.

The median income for a household in the county was $34,492 and the median income for a family was $48,323. Males had a median income of $39,523 versus $28,952 for females. The per capita income for the county was $21,907. About 15.3% of families and 20.6% of the population were below the poverty line, including 29.0% of those under age 18 and 10.7% of those age 65 or over.

=== 2000 census ===
As of the census of 2000, there were 96,784 people, 41,180 households, and 25,490 families living in the county. The population density was 344 inhabitants per square mile (133/km^{2}). There were 45,615 housing units at an average density of 162 units per square mile (63 units/km^{2}). The racial makeup of the county was 93.37% White, 4.29% Black or African American, 0.18% Native American, 0.77% Asian, 0.04% Pacific Islander, 0.20% from other races, and 1.14% from two or more races. 0.68% of the population were Hispanic or Latino of any race.

There were 41,180 households, out of which 25.20% had children under the age of 18 living with them, 47.10% were married couples living together, 11.60% had a female householder with no husband present, and 38.10% were non-families. 31.30% of all households were made up of individuals, and 12.50% had someone living alone who was 65 years of age or older. The average household size was 2.27 and the average family size was 2.85.

In the county, the population was spread out, with 20.00% under the age of 18, 13.50% from 18 to 24, 26.80% from 25 to 44, 23.60% from 45 to 64, and 16.00% who were 65 years of age or older. The median age was 38 years. For every 100 females there were 91.40 males. For every 100 females age 18 and over, there were 88.50 males.

The median income for a household in the county was $28,479, and the median income for a family was $37,691. Males had a median income of $31,780 versus $22,243 for females. The per capita income for the county was $17,638. About 13.70% of families and 19.20% of the population were below the poverty line, including 24.60% of those under age 18 and 10.80% of those age 65 or over.

== Education ==
=== Higher education ===
There are two colleges, and one university in Cabell County, West Virginia. All three of them are located within Huntington, West Virginia.

- Huntington Junior College
- Marshall University
- Mountwest Community and Technical College

=== Public schools ===
All public schools in Cabell County are operated by Cabell County Schools, the sole school district in the county.

==== High schools ====
- Cabell County Career Technology Center, in Huntington
- Cabell Midland High School, in Ona
- Huntington High School, in Huntington

==== Middle schools ====
- Barboursville Middle School (Feeder school for Cabell Midland High School), in Barboursville
- Huntington East Middle School (Feeder school for Huntington High School), in Huntington
- Huntington Middle School (Feeder school for Huntington High School), in Huntington
- Milton Middle School (Feeder school for Cabell Midland High School), in Milton

==== Elementary schools ====
- Altizer Elementary School, in Huntington
- Central City Elementary School, in Huntington
- Cox Landing Elementary School, in Lesage
- Culloden Elementary School, in Culloden
- Davis Creek Elementary School, in Barboursville
- Explorer Academy, in Huntington
- Guyandotte Elementary School, in Huntington
- Highlawn Elementary School, in Huntington
- Hite-Saunders Elementary School, in Huntington
- Martha Elementary School, in Barboursville
- Meadows Elementary School, in Huntington
- Milton Elementary School, in Milton
- Nichols Elementary School, in Barboursville
- Ona Elementary School, in Ona
- South Side Elementary School, in Huntington
- Spring Hill Elementary School, in Huntington
- Village of Barboursville Elementary School, in Barboursville

=== Private schools ===
Cabell County has a number of private schools at the K-12 grade levels, they are all located in Huntington. Among them are:

- Covenant School
- Grace Christian School
- Huntington Prep School
- Mountain State Christian School - Culloden
- St. Joseph Central Catholic High School

== Communities ==
=== City ===
- Huntington (county seat; partly in Wayne County)

=== Town ===
- Milton

=== Village ===
- Barboursville

=== Magisterial districts ===
- District 1
- District 2
- District 3
- District 4
- District 5

=== Census-designated places ===
- Culloden
- Lesage
- Pea Ridge
- Salt Rock

=== Unincorporated communities ===
- Beverly Hills
- Belmont
- Chancellor Hills
- Fudges Creek
- Enslow Park
- Freeman Estates
- Grandview Heights
- Harveytown
- Hodges
- Indian Meadows
- Inez
- Melissa
- Ona
- Prairietown
- Reid
- Ridgewood
- Roach
- Sarah
- Stamford Park
- Swann
- Wilson
- Yates Crossing

== Politics ==
For most of its history, Cabell County was a swing county, voting for the national winner in every presidential election from 1892 to 2004, aside from 1924 and 1960. However, similar to the rest of West Virginia, it has since swung quite Republican. As an urban county, the swing to the GOP has been somewhat less pronounced than the rest of the state. Donald Trump carried the county by a margin of 25 percent over Hillary Clinton in 2016, by a margin of 18 percent over Joe Biden in 2020, and by a margin of 22 percent over Kamala Harris in 2024.

United States presidential election results for Cabell County, West Virginia
Year	Republican		Democratic		Third party(ies)	
Year	No.	%	No.	%	No.	%
1912	1,798	17.49%	4,793	46.62%	3,690	35.89%
1916	5,728	46.18%	6,446	51.97%	229	1.85%
1920	13,170	50.11%	12,845	48.87%	268	1.02%
1924	15,581	47.26%	16,211	49.17%	1,177	3.57%
1928	21,091	57.65%	15,340	41.93%	152	0.42%
1932	17,999	42.91%	23,498	56.01%	453	1.08%
1936	19,003	40.95%	27,319	58.87%	87	0.19%
1940	21,027	42.78%	28,125	57.22%	0	0.00%
1944	19,861	46.32%	23,020	53.68%	0	0.00%
1948	18,599	43.86%	23,680	55.84%	131	0.31%
1952	27,461	55.32%	22,179	44.68%	0	0.00%
1956	28,882	61.07%	18,408	38.93%	0	0.00%
1960	26,988	56.34%	20,911	43.66%	0	0.00%
1964	16,957	37.36%	28,437	62.64%	0	0.00%
1968	19,418	45.05%	19,018	44.12%	4,666	10.83%
1972	29,582	67.39%	14,312	32.61%	0	0.00%
1976	19,644	48.56%	20,811	51.44%	0	0.00%
1980	19,482	49.21%	17,732	44.79%	2,374	6.00%
1984	21,815	58.26%	15,513	41.43%	117	0.31%
1988	17,197	52.65%	15,368	47.05%	97	0.30%
1992	13,203	39.16%	15,111	44.82%	5,401	16.02%
1996	13,179	40.48%	16,277	49.99%	3,104	9.53%
2000	16,440	51.03%	14,896	46.24%	880	2.73%
2004	21,035	55.43%	16,583	43.70%	332	0.87%
2008	18,793	54.11%	15,292	44.03%	647	1.86%
2012	17,985	55.93%	13,568	42.19%	605	1.88%
2016	19,850	59.09%	11,447	34.08%	2,294	6.83%
2020	21,721	58.14%	14,994	40.13%	645	1.73%
2024	21,229	59.92%	13,474	38.03%	726	2.05%

== Notable people ==
- James F. Adams, Union Army soldier in the American Civil War, and recipient of the Medal of Honor.
- George Baumgardner, MLB player for the St. Louis Browns.
- Wayne Chapman, football coach.
- Brad Dourif, actor.
- Catherine Shipe East, government worker and feminist.
- Diamond Teeth Mary, blues singer.
- Hal Greer, NBA player.
- Thomas Hannan, revolutionary war soldier, settler of Cabell County.
- Hawkshaw Hawkins, bluegrass singer.
- Albert G. Jenkins, planter, lawyer, politician, and Confederate general.
- Alberta Gallatin Jenkins, stage and screen actress, daughter of Albert G. Jenkins.
- Evan Jenkins: State Senator and US Congressman of West Virginia.
- Ezra Midkiff, MLB player for the Cincinnati Reds and the New York Yankees.
- Katie Lee, television personality and chef.
- O.J. Mayo, NBA player.
- Breece D’J Pancake, short story author.
- Brett Rowe, stock car driver.
- Sampson Sanders, slaveholder famous for freeing his 51 slaves upon his death in 1849.
- Eli C. D. Shortridge, third governor of North Dakota from 1893 to 1895; born in Cabell County.
- Jason Starkey, NFL player for the Arizona Cardinals.
- Ruth Sullivan, autism advocate.
- Milton Supman, comedian known professionally as Soupy Sales (attended Huntington High School and Marshall College).
- Phil Swann, singer.
- Jim Thornton, announcer on Wheel of Fortune.
- Bill Walker, NBA player.
- Kayla Williams, gymnast and gold medalist (attended Huntington High).
- Carter G. Woodson, founder of Black History Month (moved to attend Douglass High School).
- Steve Yeager, MLB player for the Los Angeles Dodgers and the Seattle Mariners, co-MVP of the 1981 World Series.

== See also ==
- Beech Fork State Park
- Cabell County Courthouse
- Green Bottom Wildlife Management Area
- National Register of Historic Places listings in Cabell County, West Virginia
