= Fudges Creek, West Virginia =

Unincorporated community in West Virginia, United States

- Unincorporated community
- Location within the state of West Virginia Fudges Creek (the United States)
- Coordinates: 38°24′24″N 82°12′24″W
- Country: United States
- State: West Virginia
- County: Cabell
- Elevation: 646 ft (197 m)
- Time zone: UTC-5 (Eastern (EST))
  - Summer (DST): UTC-4 (EDT)
- GNIS ID: 1549538

Fudges Creek is an unincorporated community in Cabell County, West Virginia, United States.

The community takes its name from nearby Fudges Creek.
