= Roach, West Virginia =

- Unincorporated community
- Location within the state of West Virginia Roach (the United States)
- Coordinates: 38°21′40″N 82°13′24″W
- Country: United States
- State: West Virginia
- County: Cabell
- Elevation: 581 ft (177 m)
- Time zone: UTC-5 (Eastern (EST))
  - Summer (DST): UTC-4 (EDT)
- GNIS ID: 1545786

Roach is an unincorporated community in Cabell County, West Virginia, United States. Its post office has been closed.
