= Prairietown, West Virginia =

- Unincorporated community
- Location within the state of West Virginia Prairietown (the United States)
- Coordinates: 38°20′48″N 82°10′31″W
- Country: United States
- State: West Virginia
- County: Cabell
- Elevation: 630 ft (190 m)
- Time zone: UTC-5 (Eastern (EST))
  - Summer (DST): UTC-4 (EDT)
- GNIS ID: 1555403

Prairietown is an unincorporated community in Cabell County, West Virginia, United States. The name was supposed to be Perrytown, but was mis-labeled by cartographers. Named because the area is home to scores of descendants of Rev. Benjamin Level Perry, born 12 Apr 1808 in Orange Co, Virginia; died 08 Jun 1897 near "Perrytown".
