= Sarah, West Virginia =

- Unincorporated community
- Location within the state of West Virginia Sarah (the United States)
- Coordinates: 38°19′48″N 82°15′28″W
- Country: United States
- State: West Virginia
- County: Cabell
- Elevation: 577 ft (176 m)
- Time zone: UTC-5 (Eastern (EST))
  - Summer (DST): UTC-4 (EDT)
- GNIS ID: 1549913

Sarah is an unincorporated community in Cabell County, West Virginia, United States.
