= Ezra Midkiff =

American baseball player (1882–1957)

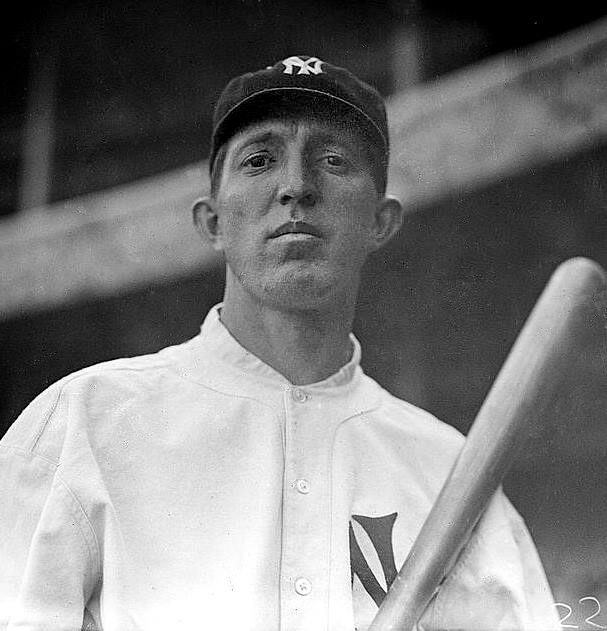
- Third baseman
- Born: November 13, 1882; Salt Rock, West Virginia, U.S.
- Died: March 20, 1957 (aged 74); Huntington, West Virginia, U.S.
- Batted: Left Threw: Right

MLB debut
- October 5, 1909, for the Cincinnati Reds

Last MLB appearance
- August 6, 1913, for the New York Yankees

MLB statistics
- Batting average: .207
- Hits: 77
- Runs batted in: 23
- Stats at Baseball Reference

Teams
- Cincinnati Reds (1909); New York Highlanders/Yankees (1912–1913)

Ezra Millington "Salt Rock" Midkiff (November 13, 1882 – March 20, 1957) was an American Major League Baseball third baseman who played in 1909 with the Cincinnati Reds and in 1912 and 1913 with the New York Highlanders (renamed the New York Yankees for the 1913 season).

== Early life ==
Midkiff was born in Salt Rock, West Virginia on November 13, 1882. He acquired his nickname "Salt Rock" from his birthplace.

== Major League career ==
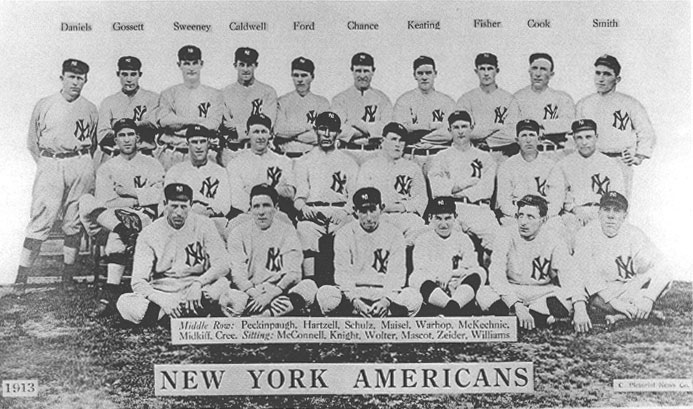
Midkiff, seated 2nd from right on middle row, in a team picture for the New York Yankees in 1913.

Midkiff was 26 years old when he made his Major League debut on October 5, 1909, with the Cincinnati Reds. After spending time in the minor leagues, Midkiff was acquired by the Highlanders from the San Antonio Bronchos of the Texas League in 1912. Midkiff spent 1913 as the starting third baseman for the Yankees, but Fritz Maisel took the job midway through the season, and Midkiff was sold to the minor league Baltimore Orioles in August.

== Minor league career ==
In 1914, Midkiff was a teammate of Babe Ruth before Ruth came to the majors. After parts of two seasons in Baltimore, Midkiff ended the 1914 season with the Louisville Colonels of the American Association.

In May 1915, Midkiff was named the Colonels' manager. Midkiff, who was at the time suffering from a broken ankle, was named Manager of the club in place of John F. Hayden. At the end of the season, Midkiff was let go, and signed with the Memphis Chickasaws of the Southern Association. He continued to play in the minor leagues until 1921, and as late as 1940 managed the Huntington Aces of the class-D Mountain State League.

== Death ==
After baseball, Midkiff served a sheriff of Cabell County, West Virginia as a Democrat. He died of a heart issue in Huntington, West Virginia on March 20, 1957.
