= Wilson, Cabell County, West Virginia =

Wilson, West Virginia
- Unincorporated community
- Location within West Virginia Location within the United States
- Coordinates: 38°25′34″N 82°19′49″W
- Country: United States
- State: West Virginia
- County: Cabell
- Elevation: 554 ft (169 m)
- Time zone: UTC-5 (Eastern (EST))
  - Summer (DST): UTC-4 (EDT)
- Area codes: 304 & 681
- GNIS feature ID: 1555997

Wilson is an unincorporated community in Cabell County, West Virginia, United States. Wilson is located on the Guyandotte River, 6.25 miles (10.06 km) east of downtown Huntington.
