= Salt Rock, West Virginia =

- Census-designated place
- Location in Cabell County and the state of West Virginia.
- Coordinates: 38°19′23″N 82°13′16″W
- Country: United States
- State: West Virginia
- County: Cabell

Area
  - Total: 3.140 sq mi (8.13 km^{2})
  - Land: 3.065 sq mi (7.94 km^{2})
  - Water: 0.075 sq mi (0.19 km^{2})

Population (2020)
  - Total: 373
  - Density: 122/sq mi (47.0/km^{2})
- Time zone: UTC-5 (Eastern (EST))
  - Summer (DST): UTC-4 (EDT)
- ZIP Codes: 25559

Salt Rock (also Saltrock) is a census-designated place (CDP) in southern Cabell County, West Virginia. As of the 2020 census, its population was 373 (down from 388 at the 2010 census). It lies along West Virginia Route 10 southeast of the city of Huntington, the county seat of Cabell County. Its elevation is 581 feet (177 m). Although Salt Rock is unincorporated, it has a post office, with the ZIP Code of 25559.

== History ==
The first white settlers arrived in the Salt Rock area from Giles County, Virginia, while pursuing an Indigenous raiding party that had taken their horses. Permanent settlement was established by 1800, with the McComas and Hatfield families among the earliest settlers.

In the early days before road construction, salt was transported to the area on pack horses from the Kanawha Salt Works. As transportation infrastructure improved, oxen and carts were used, followed by ox-wagons. Local residents later drilled a well by hand using a spring pole method along the river near the present-day Salt Rock bridge. Though the exact depth was unknown, the well produced salt water. Large kettles and a furnace were then constructed to manufacture salt locally. The community was named Salt Rock after this local salt manufacturing operation. Remnants of the old furnace stones were reportedly still visible along the banks of the Guyandotte River in the early 20th century.

Thomas Ward began producing salt in the area as early as 1817, and salt production soon became a major local industry. According to local legend, the community's name may also derive from the practice of farmers placing salt on rocks along the river to attract cattle to drink.

Archaeological evidence, including petroglyphs, village sites, mounds, and artifacts, indicates that Indigenous peoples inhabited the area as early as 1000 A.D.

== Salt Rock Petroglyphs ==
The Salt Rock Petroglyphs are a significant historic site located near the Guyandotte River in Salt Rock, West Virginia. Carved into two large sandstone boulders, the petroglyphs are attributed to the Fort Ancient culture (circa 1000–1700 CE). The carvings include a full-length human figure wearing a "weeping eye" mask, a bird, and a hybrid creature resembling both a deer and a serpent.

The site was first documented in 1848 by Ephraim Squier and Edwin Davis in Ancient Monuments of the Mississippi Valley, one of the earliest systematic studies of Native American earthworks and rock art. The carvings are believed to have ceremonial or spiritual significance, possibly linked to a nearby Fort Ancient village site at Gue Farm, where a similar mask was discovered.

The petroglyphs are considered among the most detailed and best-preserved in West Virginia. However, they are vulnerable to natural erosion and vandalism. Preservation efforts have been proposed, including the construction of a protective shelter over the stones.

The site is located on private property at coordinates 38.3113632°N 82.2062759°W and is not currently accessible to the public.

== Notable people ==
- Ezra Midkiff – Major League Baseball player who played for the Cincinnati Reds (1909) and New York Yankees (1912–1913)
- Josh Brunty – Professor and current head coach of the US Cyber Team
