= Bob Orders =

American football player (1932–2014)

- Orders c. 1953

No. 54
- Position: Center

Personal information
- Born: January 9, 1932; Kermit, West Virginia, U.S.
- Died: April 22, 2014 (aged 82); Charleston, West Virginia, U.S.
- Listed height: 6 ft 4 in (1.93 m)
- Listed weight: 227 lb (103 kg)

Career information
- College: Army 1949-1950; West Virginia 1952-1953
- NFL draft: 1953: 13th round, 151st overall pick

Awards and highlights
- First-team All-American (1953); Two-sport prep All-State selection; 1948 First-team All-West Virginia football team selection; Two-year letterman at Army; Two-year letterman at West Virginia; Two-time All-Southern Conference selection; 1953 West Virginia Athlete of the Year; West Virginia University Hall of Fame inductee; Mountaineer Legends Society inductee

Robert Orders (January 9, 1932 – April 22, 2014) was an American college football player who was a center for the Army Black Knights and West Virginia Mountaineers. Orders was a star two-sport athlete at Huntington High School in West Virginia and there earned prep All-State selection in both football and basketball. He was a two-year letterman at West Point and a two-year letterman at WVU. In 1953 Orders earned first team All-American honors from the NEA Service and both second and third team selections from various selectors. Orders was inducted into the WVU Sports Hall of Fame in 1996.

In the 1953 NFL draft, Orders was picked 151st overall in the 13th round by the Green Bay Packers but declined the offer, choosing to enter into military service.

While at the U.S. Military Academy, Orders was one of 90 players implicated in the 1951 Army "Cribbing Scandal", an investigation into a large scale honor-code violation centered around the Army Cadets football team. Orders was expelled from the academy and opted to return to West Virginia to complete his academic and athletic career.

== Early life ==
Robert Orders was born on January 9, 1932, in Kermit, West Virginia. He was raised in Huntington, West Virginia, and attended Huntington Central High School. At Huntington Central, Orders played as a two-sport athlete for the football and basketball teams. He was a prep all-state selection in both sports and made the 1948 first-team All-West Virginia football team.

Orders graduated with honors from Huntington Central High School in 1948 with offers from nine major schools, including The US Military Academy and West Virginia University. He chose to accept his West Point offer and enrolled at the academy.

== Cribbing scandal ==
While at West Point, Orders competed as a center for the academy's gridiron football team. In both his years at Army, the 1949 & 1950 seasons, Orders earned letters.

During the summer of 1951, a large scale honor-code violation was discovered in the school's athletic department. It was discovered that head coach Earl "Red" Blaik had instructed West Point representatives to visit various congressmen in order to persuade them to appoint applicants on the basis of athletic ability over academic and character ratings. Further allegations arose surrounding "all-expenses-paid" visits and "illegitimate" appointments to the academy on the part of Col. Earl Blaik's athletic department.

The primary conflict of the scandal, however, was the discover that "[...] a majority of the West Point football team was involved in breaking the academy's code of honor." The code states: "A Cadet will not lie, cheat, steal, or tolerate those who do." At the time, exams taken at different times for the same class at West Point used the same questions each time, so the first cadets to take the assessment would copy the test's contents and give it to the next test-takers. The scheme originated when members of the athletics programs, specifically the football team, found it difficult to achieve the grades necessary for athletics while also attending the mandatory, rigorous practices for the powerhouse program. Reports blame an over-emphasis on athletics as cadets' priority and the appointment of students lacking the academic requirements for attendance at the academy. Of the 90 dismissed cadets, 35 returned to colleges across the country, of those 32 were immediately eligible to continue their football career, 17 of whom decided to continue playing. Orders was among those implicated in the investigation and was one the 17 to continue with the sport.

== Career at West Virginia ==
Orders continued his academic and athletic careers at West Virginia University. His arrival was a welcome one and greeted with some fanfare as the Mountaineers had gone 4–6–1, 2–8, & 5–5 from 1949 to 1951. Orders, alongside a host of new West Virginia players, led the Mountaineers to a 7–2 season in 1951. That season included a 16–0 victory over eighteenth ranked Pitt in 1952, considered one of the greatest victories in team history. The 1952 victory over Pittsburgh marked WVU's first defeat of a top-20 team in program history. The conclusion of that season saw Orders earning letter distinction and All-Southern Conference selection.

The following season, West Virginia went 8–1 in the regular season and 4–0 in Southern Conference Play. Again the team defeated a then-seventeenth ranked Pitt team, that game is also considered one of the Mountaineers' greatest all-time victories and was the second time the team ever defeated a top-20 team on the gridiron. West Virginia was crowned as Southern Conference Champions and were invited to the 1954 Sugar Bowl, the game was West Virginia's first appearance in a New Year's bowl game and the team's first participation in an official post-season game. Despite a loss in that game, the season marked a new high in the program's history.

Following the 1953 season, Orders received his fourth letterman distinction. He also achieved his second All-Southern Conference selection and was picked by the NEA Service as a first team All-American along with second and third team All-American selections by Central Press, United Press, and Football Digest. He was named 1953 West Virginia Athlete of the Year. Mountaineers head coach Art Lewis would later describe Orders as "the best in-the-line blocker I've ever coached" and Fred Digby, founder of the Sugar Bowl, stated,"I don't believe I have ever seen a better offensive center than Bob Orders of West Virginia." Orders was credited with being a driving force behind West Virginia's success, being referred to as "the rock" in reference to his place in both the offensive and defensive lines.

In 1960, The Pittsburgh Press released an all-time West Virginia team which place Orders as the center and later named him the best player in the university's history.

In 1996 Orders was inducted into the WVU Sports Hall of Fame, and was named an inaugural member of WVU’s Mountaineer Legends Society in 2016. He is also a member of the West Virginia Sports Writers Hall of Fame.

While at West Virginia, Orders was in ROTC, Beta Theta Pi fraternity, and was the vice president of his senior class.

== Later life ==
After his graduation from West Virginia University with a Bachelor of Science degree in the College of Commerce, Orders was selected 151st overall by the Green Bay Packers in the 13th round of the 1953 NFL draft. Orders declined the offer from Green Bay and opted to joined the US Army immediately following his graduation from the ROTC. He served for two years at Fort Benning, Georgia, from 1954 to 1956, upon his honorable discharge, moved to Charleston, West Virginia, with his wife, Susan Ball Orders. He worked in insurance for two years and in asphalt and paving for another seven before founding Orders and Haynes Paving Company in 1966.

Orders served as a board member of the West Virginia University Foundation, Kanawha Banking and Trust (now United Bank), AAA, YMCA, Boy Scouts of America, Goodwill and the National Asphalt and Paving Association. Orders also served as president of the Contractor's Association of West Virginia.

He was a deacon and elder for the First Presbyterian Church of Charleston and was a member of the Lions Club International until his death.

He died on April 22, 2014, in his Charleston home at the age of 82.
