= Cabell County Schools =

School district in West Virginia, United States

Location
- Cabell County, West Virginia

District information
- Type: Public
- Grades: PreK-12
- Superintendent: Timothy Hardesty
- NCES District ID: 5400180

Students and staff
- Athletic conference: Mountain State Athletic Conference

Other information
- Website: www.cabellschools.com

Cabell County Schools is the operating school district within Cabell County, West Virginia.

== Schools ==
The following schools are in Cabell County Schools:

=== High Schools ===
- Crossroads Academy
- Cabell Midland High School
- Huntington High School
- Woody Williams Center for Advanced Learning and Careers

=== Middle Schools ===
- Barboursville Middle School
- Huntington East Middle School
- Huntington Middle School
- Milton Middle School

=== Elementary Schools ===
- Altizer Elementary School
- Central City Elementary School
- Cox Landing Elementary School
- Culloden Elementary School
- Davis Creek Elementary School
- Explorer Academy
- Guyandotte Elementary School
- Highlawn Elementary School
- Hite-Saunders Elementary School
- Martha Elementary School
- Meadows Elementary School
- Milton Elementary School
- Nichols Elementary School
- Ona Elementary School
- Salt Rock Elementary School
- Southside Elementary School
- Spring Hill Elementary School
- 1Village of Barboursville Elementary School

=== Virtual Schools ===
- Cabell County Learning Academy
