= Huntington High School (West Virginia) =

Public school in West Virginia, US

Location
- 1 Highlander Way; Huntington, West Virginia 25701; United States; 38°23′38″N 82°23′55″W

Information
- Type: Public
- Motto: By Faith and Service
- Established: 1996
- School district: Cabell County Schools
- Principal: Joedy Cunningham
- Staff: 117.85 (FTE)
- Grades: 9–12
- Student to teacher ratio: 14.60
- Campus size: 69 acres (0.28 km^{2})
- Campus type: Suburban
- Colors: Old Gold and Hunter Green
- Athletics conference: Mountain State Athletic Conference
- Mascot: Highlander
- Nickname: Highlanders
- Rival: Cabell Midland High School
- Website: Huntington High School

Huntington High School is a four-year high school located in Huntington, West Virginia, United States.

== History ==
Huntington High School was established in 1996 through the consolidation of the old Huntington and Huntington East High Schools. The school has a student body of approximately 1600 students. Huntington High School carries the Highlander mascot with the colors old gold and hunter green. The Huntington High Staff consists of a principal, five assistant principals, five counselors, 142 teachers, five secretaries, an athletic director, and 10 custodians. Eleven cooks staff the cafeteria and offer a variety of both hot and cold lunch selections daily. Four administrative offices can be found throughout the building to facilitate the needs of both students and staff. The award-winning curricular and extra-curricular programs offered at Huntington High School provide activities for all areas of interest. Huntington High is accredited by the North Central Association.

Huntington High School (which combined old Huntington and Huntington East High School) was originally called Cabell West High School during the school project planning period. The name was then changed to Huntington Summit when the name of the other public high school in Cabell County was changed to Cabell Midland. The Cabell County Board of Education then decided that the new school should have connections to the two schools, Huntington High and Huntington East, that were being consolidated together. That is why the new school kept the Huntington High School name and then adopted the Highlanders nickname from the soon-to-be-closed Huntington East High School. The new school colors have no connection to the old high schools.

=== Jamie Oliver's Food Revolution ===
In the fall of 2009, the British celebrity chef Jamie Oliver arrived in Huntington, West Virginia, which had recently been named the unhealthiest city in America. He starred and produced in Jamie Oliver's Food Revolution, a reality TV series that aired during 2010 and 2011 on ABC in the United States. Oliver visited Huntington High School during his campaign to curb obesity in the United States. In 2016, after the filming of this television show focused on moderating eating habits and fighting obesity, the Cabell County Board of Education announced the school would pilot a program of unlimited and free food for all students regardless of socio-economic status.

Former Highlanders students criticized the show, stating that a segment filmed in the school's gymnasium was deceptively edited by ABC. More specifically, some students claim that the film crew requested multiple retakes of the assembly when Oliver announced that french fries would no longer be served in the cafeteria because the students' collective 'booing' was not deemed sufficiently authentic for their "reality" show. Shortly after Oliver left, a study by the West Virginia University Health Research Center reported that 77 percent of students were “very unhappy” with his food. Students who relied on school meals for nearly half of their daily calories routinely dumped their trays in the trash.

=== 2022 Walkouts ===
In 2022, the high school made national news over a series of walkouts associated with a religious service being held in the school's auditorium.

== Student body ==
Huntington High, with an enrollment of 1,731, is one of the largest high schools in the state. The population is 50.85% male. The school is 77.46% White, 14.70% Black, 1.82% Hispanic, 0.85% Asian, and 4.86% of 2 or more races.

== Athletics ==
Huntington High School's athletic programs are well-represented at the state level. HHS has produced over 100 West Virginia State Championships in multiple sports.

=== 2005-2007 Boy's basketball dynasty ===
The 2005–2007 Huntington High School boys basketball "three-peat" is widely celebrated as the most dominant era in West Virginia high school sports history. Under head coach Lloyd McGuffin, the Huntington High Highlanders captured three consecutive Class AAA state championships in 2005, 2006, and 2007.

The 2006–2007 Huntington High School boys basketball team, led by McDonald's All Americans and first round NBA draft picks O. J. Mayo and Patrick Patterson, earned a top five ranking nationally by Sports Illustrated, USA Today and Prep Nation and won their third straight Class AAA state championship. Other members of the roster include Chris Early, Mike Taylor, Jamaal Williams, Bruce Senior, Colin Oakley, C.J. Crawford, Brandon Hutchinson, and Lambros Svingos. The team traveled across the country—playing at venues like Duke University's Cameron Indoor Stadium, Marshall University's Cam Henderson Center, University of Kentucky Memorial Coliseum—and drew packed crowds wherever they played. Huntington finished the 2007 season with a 25–2 record, routing South Charleston 103–61 in the state title game, where Mayo recorded a triple-double with 41 points. They won their three state tournament games by an average of 48 points. Widely considered the greatest high school basketball team in West Virginia history, the roster was made entirely of home-grown local players from Huntington.

After retiring from his high school career as the number one ranked prospect in the nation, Mayo would go on to play one standout season at the University of Southern California (USC), earning first-team All-Pac-10 honors. He was drafted 3rd overall in the 2008 NBA Draft by the Minnesota Timberwolves and immediately traded to the Memphis Grizzlies. He played 8 total seasons in the NBA for the Grizzlies, Dallas Mavericks, and Milwaukee Bucks, making the NBA All-Rookie Team in 2009.

Patterson starred at the University of Kentucky for three seasons, graduating in just three years. He was named SEC Freshman of the Year (2008) and a First-Team All-SEC selection twice before turning pro. He was selected 14th overall in the 2010 NBA Draft by the Houston Rockets. He enjoyed a solid 11-to-12-year NBA career playing as a reliable stretch-forward for the Rockets, Sacramento Kings, Toronto Raptors, Oklahoma City Thunder, and Los Angeles Clippers. Huntington High School honored Patterson's contribution to the school and the city by retiring his number.

Chris Early was ranked as a Top 150 national recruit by Rivals.com and would initially sign with the University of Oklahoma and later transfer to the University of Chattanooga (UTC). He spent four season with UTC and served as a team captain during his tenure. Bruce Senior would later commit to playing for the Marshall University Thundering Herd under Coach Donnie Jones. Jamaal Williams brought his skills to the collegiate level for the Saluqis at Southwest Tennessee Community College in Memphis, Tennessee. Mike Taylor joined the roster of the West Virginia Wild, an inaugural team in the American Basketball Association (ABA). He played alongside local legends and former collegiate stars from Marshall University and West Virginia University. Lambros Svingos eventually became the Head Coach for Huntington High School Boy's Basketball Team.

=== State championships ===
==== Pre-consolidation state championships ====
Listed below are all championships won by Huntington East High School (E) and Old Huntington High School (H).

	State championships	State runners-up
Sport	Year(s)	Year(s)
Baseball	1949 (E), 1961 (H), 1964 (H), 1966 (H), 1976 (H), 1980 (E), 1981 (E), 1982 (E), 1986 (E), 1987 (E)	1974 (E)
Boys basketball	1925 (H), 1931 (H), 1937 (H), 1944 (H), 1947 (E), 1961 (H), 1969 (H), 1988 (H)	1932 (H), 1941 (H), 1948 (E), 1955 (H)
Girls basketball	1919 (H)	1920 (H), 1986 (E), 1992 (E), 1993 (E), 1996 (E)
Cheer		1989 (H)
Boys cross country	1961 (H), 1962 (H), 1964 (E), 1965 (E)	1958 (H), 1959 (E), 1960 (E), 1967 (E)
Football		1964 (H), 1966 (H)
Golf	1960 (H), 1961 (H), 1963 (H), 1964 (H), 1968 (H), 1973 (H)	1954 (H), 1966 (H), 1975 (H), 1991 (E), 1996 (H)
Softball	1996 (H)
Boys tennis	1956 (H), 1957 (H), 1962 (E), 1973 (H), 1995 (H)
Girls tennis	1995 (H), 1996 (H)
Boys track	1914 (H), 1915 (H), 1918 (H), 1919 (H), 1920 (H), 1927 (H), 1931 (H), 1938 (H), 1939 (H), 1940 (H), 1942 (H), 1945 (H), 1947 (H), 1963 (H), 1967 (H), 1990 (H), 1993 (H)
Girls track	1982 (H), 1985 (H), 1988 (H), 1989 (H), 1990 (H)
Volleyball	1985 (E), 1986 (E), 1987 (E), 1988 (E), 1990 (E)	1984 (E)

==== Post-consolidation state championships ====
Listed below are all championships won by Huntington High after 1996.

	State championships	State runners-up
Sport	Year(s)	Year(s)
Boys basketball	2005, 2006, 2007, 2014, 2015, 2017	2016
Girls basketball	2000, 2017, 2021, 2022	2007, 2008, 2009, 2016
Football	2022	2013, 2021
Golf	1997, 1998, 1999, 2019
Softball	2007, 2008
Girls soccer	2004	2003
Boys swimming	2024
Boys tennis	2000, 2004, 2011, 2012, 2017
Girls tennis	1997, 1998, 2001, 2004, 2009, 2011, 2012, 2013, 2014, 2016, 2017, 2021, 2025	2022
Boys track	2023, 2026
Girls track	2026	2025
Wrestling	2013, 2014

=== Huntington Prep School ===
In 2009, Huntington Prep School was originally housed within St. Joseph Central Catholic High School, but in 2020 ended that relationship. Since 2021, Huntington Prep became part of Cabell County Schools after they moved host schools to Huntington High School.

== Clubs and organizations ==
- Beta Club
- Esports Club
- Fellowship of Christian Athletes
- Future Business Leaders of America
- Gardening Club
- Herpetology Club
- International Thespian Society
- JROTC
- Key Club
- Latin Club
- National Honors Society
- ONYX Dance Team
- Operation BEST
- Philanthropy Club
- Poetry Club
- Nickelback Fan Club
- Science Olympiad
- Student Government (Member of the National Association of Student Councils)
- Speech & Debate / National Speech and Debate Association
- Young Democrats
- Young Libertarians
- Young Republicans

== Notable alumni ==
=== As Old Huntington High School ===
- 1917 - Charlie Honaker, former NFL halfback, Cleveland Bulldogs
- 1917 - Hoge Workman, retired relief pitcher in Major League Baseball and a player-coach in the National Football League
- 1922 - Johnson Fry, former MLB pitcher, Cleveland Indians
- 1930 - Eddie King, former athletic director, Morris Harvey College
- 1939 - Dagmar, former actress, model, and television personality of 1950
- 1942 - Marshall Hawkins, retired NBA basketball Forward
- 1944 - Soupy Sales, former comedian and entertainer, notable panelist on the television hit What's My Line?
- 1948 - Bob Orders, former NFL center, Green Bay Packers
- 1955 - Leo Byrd, gold medalist at the 1959 Pan American Games for Basketball
- 1955 - Homer Heck, former West Virginia House of Delegates
- 1962 - Jacqueline Jackson, author and peace activist
- 1974 - Stephen T. Williams, mayor of Huntington, West Virginia
- 1977 - Bruce R. Evans, venture capitalist, corporate director and philanthropist
- 1982 - Rick Reed, former MLB starting pitcher for the Cincinnati Reds, Pittsburgh Pirates, New York Mets, & Minnesota Twins
- 1983 - Jim Thornton, radio, television announcer, and voice actor; current Wheel of Fortune announcer
- 1984 - Ken Chertow, U.S. Olympic freestyle wrestler at the 1988 Summer Olympics

=== As Huntington High School ===
- 1999 - Justin McElroy, podcaster, co-founder of Polygon; co-host of My Brother, My Brother and Me
- 1999 - Jeff Morrison, 1999 NCAA Tennis Singles Champion for the Florida Gators
- 2002 - Chase Harrison, former MLS goalkeeper
- 2002 - Travis McElroy, podcaster, voice actor; co-host of My Brother, My Brother and Me
- 2003 - Sean Hornbuckle, Minority Leader of the West Virginia House of Delegates
- 2005 - Miko Alley, former soccer player for Philippines women's national football team
- 2005 - Griffin McElroy, podcaster, voice actor, and listed as a Forbes "30 Under 30" media luminary in 2017; co-host of My Brother, My Brother and Me
- 2007 - O. J. Mayo, retired NBA basketball shooting guard
- 2007 - Patrick Patterson, retired NBA basketball small forward
- 2011 - Kayla Williams, 2009 Vault World Champion
- 2016 - Tavian Dunn-Martin, CEBL point guard
- 2019 - Darnell Wright, five-star football recruit and 10th overall pick in the 2023 NFL draft
- 2023 - Trentyn Flowers, NBA small forward
- 2025 - Darryn Peterson, five-star recruit and one of the top players in the 2025 recruiting class

== Popular culture ==
- Rand University, a feature-length 30 for 30 documentary, explores Randy Moss's origins, with its opening scenes set at Huntington High School
