= Wilson, Kanawha County, West Virginia =

Wilson, West Virginia
- Unincorporated community
- Location within West Virginia Location within the United States
- Coordinates: 38°23′07″N 81°35′36″W
- Country: United States
- State: West Virginia
- County: Kanawha
- Elevation: 614 ft (187 m)
- Time zone: UTC-5 (Eastern (EST))
  - Summer (DST): UTC-4 (EDT)
- Area codes: 304 & 681
- GNIS feature ID: 1555998

Wilson is an unincorporated community in Kanawha County, West Virginia, United States. Wilson is 3.25 miles (5.23 km) northeast of Charleston.
