= Cabell Midland High School =

Location
- 2300 Route 60; Ona, West Virginia 25545; United States; 38.42818°N 82.2073°W

Information
- Type: Public
- Motto: Live Pure, Speak True, Right Wrong
- Established: 1994
- School district: Cabell County Schools
- Principal: Matthew Adkins
- Grades: 9–12
- Campus type: Rural
- Colors: Scarlet and silver
- Athletics: Football, basketball, cross country, track, volleyball, cheerleading, soccer, baseball, softball, archery, wrestling
- Athletics conference: Mountain State Athletic Conference
- Nickname: The Knights
- Rival: Huntington High School
- Website: https://www.cabellschools.com/o/cmhs

Cabell Midland High School is a four-year high school located in Ona, West Virginia. The school's name is derived from two sources: "Cabell" for the county in which it is located, and "Midland" for the famous Midland Trail.

== Overview ==
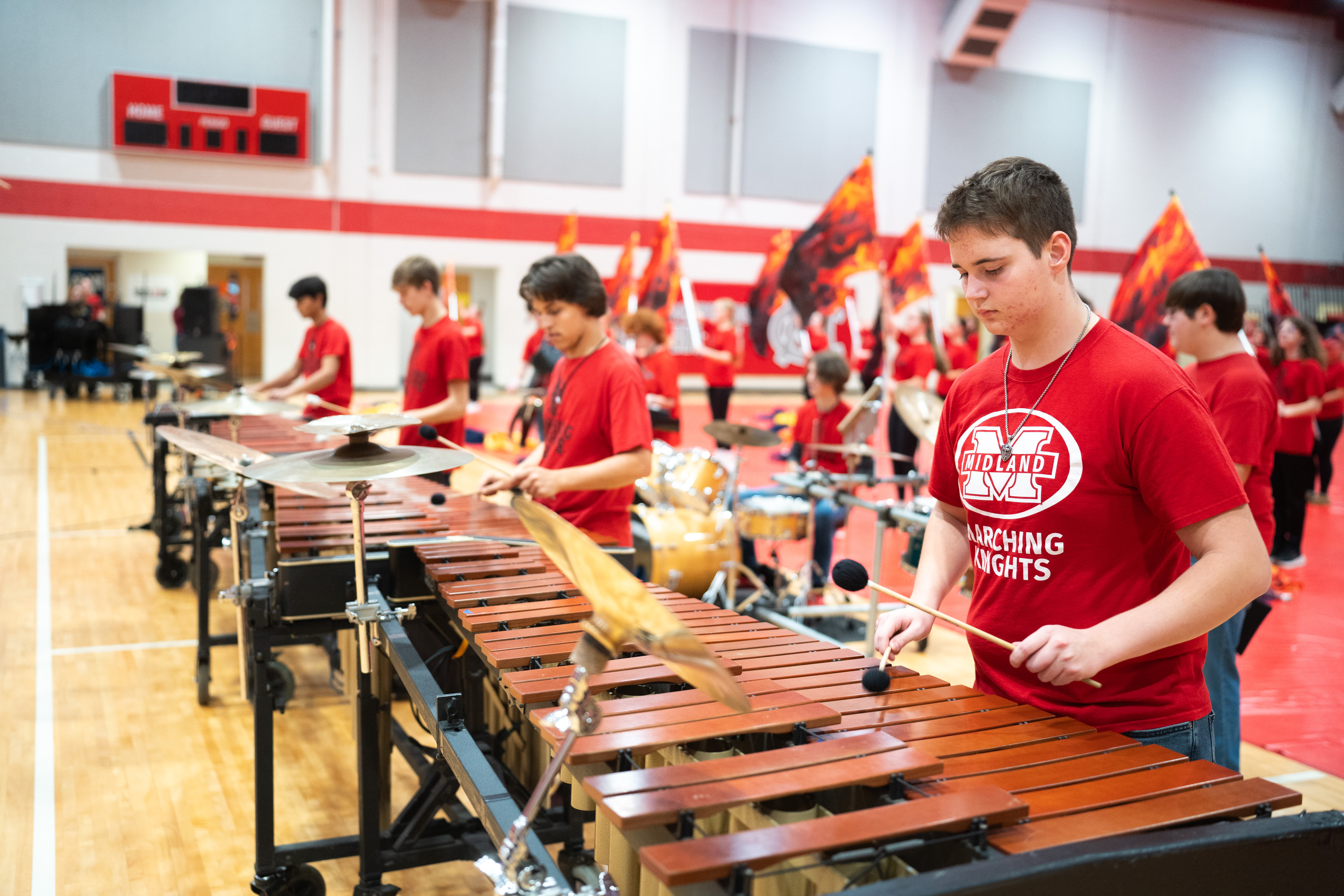
Students' musical performance in 2024

The school serves students predominantly from the eastern part of Cabell County from Barboursville Middle School and Milton Middle School. The building was constructed in 1994 through of the consolidation of Barboursville High School and Milton High School. The approximately 286,000-square-foot (26,600 m^{2}) building was designed by the West Virginia architectural firm Williamson Shriver Architects. The design received an Honor Award for Architectural Excellence from the West Virginia Chapter of the American Institute of Architects (AIA-WV) in 1995. The temporary name of the school during the planning stages was Cabell East High School, but after asking for input and ideas from the public, the official name of Cabell Midland High School was later decided on by the Cabell County Board of Education.

== Student body ==
Cabell Midland had an enrollment of 1,713 as of the 2023–2024 school year. The population was 97.8% White, 0.8% Black, 0.8% Asian, 0.4% Hispanic, and 0.2% American Indian. The student-to-teacher ratio was 17.9, ranking 116th of the 159 secondary schools in the state. As of the 2018–2019 school year, Cabell Midland has 1,857 students and a faculty of 195 employees.

== Athletics ==
CMHS is a member of the Mountain State Athletic Conference (MSAC) and competes in the state's "large school" division of AAAA.

=== State championships ===
==== Pre-Consolidation State championships ====
Listed below are all championships won by Milton High School (M) and Barboursville High School (B).

Sport	State championships	State runners-ups
Boys basketball	1975 (B)	1961 (M)
Football	1953 (B)	1949 (M), 1954 (B), 1983 (B), 1984 (B)
Golf	1965 (B), 1966 (B), 1983–1985 (B)	1964 (B), 1980 (B), 1993 (B)
Softball	1987 (M), 1990 (M), 1991 (M)	
Girls track	1980 (M), 1981 (M)	

==== Post-Consolidation State championships ====
Listed below are all championships won by Cabell Midland High School after the year 1994.

Sport	State championships	State runners-ups
Baseball	2003, 2023, 2024	2006, 2013
Boys basketball	2002	
Girls basketball		2021
Cheer		2001
Marching Band	2011, 2012, 2013, 2014, 2015, 2016, 2017, 2018, 2019, 2020, 2021, 2022, 2023, 2024	
Boys cross country	1996, 2000, 2001, 2004, 2009, 2010, 2012, 2015, 2018	1999, 2003, 2005, 2007, 2011, 2013, 2014, 2016
Girls cross country	2025	1994, 1997, 2018
Football		2012, 2019
Golf	2000, 2015–2017	2004, 2013, 2021, 2022
Boys soccer		2019
Girls soccer	2017	
Softball	1995, 1997, 1999, 2000, 2005, 2021, 2025	
Girls tennis	2000	
Boys track	1996, 1997, 1998, 1999, 2003–2005, 2008, 2016, 2024	
Girls track	2006	
Volleyball	1995	1995, 1997, 2018

=== Mascot and school colors ===
Cabell Midland's mascot is the Scarlet Knight, which was chosen via a poll in 1993. The school colors are scarlet and silver.

== Notable alumni ==
- Josh Brunty – head coach of the US Cyber Team
- Katie Lee – food critic, chef, third wife of Billy Joel
- J.J. Roberts – National Football League player for the Tampa Bay Buccaneers
- Jason Starkey – former National Football League player
- Morgan Zerkle – coach for Marshall Thundering Herd softball
