= Ona, West Virginia =

- Unincorporated community
- Location within the state of West Virginia Ona (the United States)
- Coordinates: 38°25′29″N 82°12′48″W
- Country: United States
- State: West Virginia
- County: Cabell

Area
  - Total: 28.060 sq mi (72.675 km^{2})
  - Land: 27.840 sq mi (72.106 km^{2})
  - Water: 0.220 sq mi (0.569 km^{2})

Population (2020 United States Census)
  - Total: 4,512
  - Density: 162.1/sq mi (62.57/km^{2})
- Time zone: UTC-5 (Eastern (EST))
  - Summer (DST): UTC-4 (EDT)
- ZIP codes: 25545
- GNIS feature ID: 1544405

Ona is a small unincorporated community along US 60 (the old Midland Trail) in Cabell County, West Virginia, United States. It is situated roughly halfway between the towns of Barboursville to the west and Milton to the east. It has a population of 4,512 and spans over a radius of 28.06 square miles.

Ona is a part of the Huntington-Ashland, WV-KY-OH, Metropolitan Statistical Area (MSA).

== Landmarks and culture ==
Ona is home to three notable places. The first is Cabell Midland High School, which is the consolidated regional secondary school for students living in the eastern half of Cabell County. This is a rather large high school of modern construction, with extensive athletic facilities. The student population varies from 1,500 to 2,000 students.

A second landmark is the Ona Speedway. This is a prime location for local stock-car racing competitions. The track has had its share of financial difficulties and has been closed several times in prior years. It has, however, been operating continuously since 2006. The last time NASCAR held a Cup level race on a Tuesday was August 11, 1970, when Richard Petty won the West Virginia 300 in Ona.

The third landmark is the Ona Airpark. This airstrip consists of a 3154x40 foot runway (heading 064/244 magnetic) with an associated taxiway, 48 hangars, FBO and a parking lot. Flying lessons are offered Hangar 9 Aviation on site. The airport's IATA Airport Code is 12V, and its CTAF frequency is 122.8 MHz. Landing and departure control are conducted from Charleston's Yeager Airport. Ona Airpark does not have its own control tower.

Ona is also home to the Ona Little League Athletic Complex, part of the Ona Milton Little League, which sits just across the Mud River from the Ona Airpark. Spectators from around the tri-state come every spring and fall to enjoy a relaxing afternoon or evening of baseball or softball.

== Notable people ==
- J.J. Roberts, National Football League player
