= Bruce R. Evans =

American venture capitalist, corporate director and philanthropist

- Born: c. 1959; West Virginia, U.S.
- Education: Vanderbilt University (BE); Harvard University (MBA)
- Occupations: Venture capitalist, corporate director, philanthropist
- Title: Managing director
- Spouse: Bridgitt Bertram
- Children: 4

Bruce R. Evans (born c. 1959) is an American venture capitalist, corporate director and philanthropist. He is a former managing director of Summit Partners and the Chairman of the Vanderbilt University Board of Trust.

== Early life ==
Bruce R. Evans was born circa 1959 in West Virginia. He was educated at the Huntington High School in Huntington, West Virginia. He graduated from Vanderbilt University, where he earned a bachelor's degree in mechanical engineering and economics in 1981. He earned a master's in business administration from the Harvard Business School.

== Career ==
Evans began his career as a salesman for IBM in Louisville, Kentucky. Since 1986, he has been at Summit Partners, where he is managing director and chair of the board of managers.

Evans served on the boards of directors of Fleetcor from 2002 to 2014. He was also a board member of the National Venture Capital Association. He serves on the board of Analog Devices, Casa Systems, Fuze, and Masternaut.

== Philanthropy ==
Evans joined the board of trust of his alma mater, Vanderbilt University, in 2009; he succeeded Mark Dalton as its chairman in 2017. He has donated $1 million to the university, and $400,000 to the Harvard Business School. Via the Evans Family Foundation, Evans has also made charitable contributions to Boston College, Bowdoin College, Miami University, and the Roxbury Latin School. In 2018, Evans and his wife Bridgitt, announced they are committing $20 million to help support Vanderbilt University initiatives focused on the undergraduate living-learning experience, as well as leadership positions in the School of Engineering.

== Personal life ==
Evans is married to Bridgitt Bertram, an HBS alumna and contemporary art collector. They have four children. They reside in Boston, and they own another property in Telluride, Colorado.
