= Ken Chertow =

American wrestler (born 1966)

Personal information
- Full name: Kenneth Jay Chertow
- Born: October 7, 1966 (age 60) Chicago, Illinois, U.S.
- Home town: Huntington, West Virginia, U.S.

Sport
- Country: United States
- Sport: Wrestling
- Events: Freestyle and Folkstyle
- College team: Penn State
- Team: USA
Medal record
Men's freestyle wrestling
Representing the United States
Pan American Championships
Gold medal – first place	1986 Colorado Springs	57 kg
Junior World Championships
Gold medal – first place	1984 Washington, D.C.	56 kg
Collegiate Wrestling
Representing the Penn State Nittany Lions
NCAA Division I Championships
Bronze medal – third place	1987 College Park	126 lb
Bronze medal – third place	1988 Ames	118 lb

Kenneth Jay "Ken" Chertow (born October 7, 1966) is an American folkstyle and freestyle wrestler, who competed at the 1988 Summer Olympics in Seoul, South Korea. Coach Chertow conducts wrestling camps across the United States. He serves as a mentor for thousands of young wrestlers whom he coaches at his clinics and summer camps in Pennsylvania and across the nation.

== Prep ==
Chertow won two West Virginia high school state championships at Huntington High School in Huntington, West Virginia, along with Most Outstanding Wrestler awards. He culminated his prep career by winning Junior Nationals in both freestyle and Greco-Roman wrestling.

== College ==
While studying and training at Pennsylvania State University, Chertow was a 3x NCAA All-American, World Espoir Champion, Pan American Champion, and 1988 U.S. Olympian. Chertow also excelled in the classroom, where he was a 3X Academic All-American, graduating with a 3.6 GPA. He intended to become a doctor and enrolled in Medical school at Ohio State University, but ultimately dropped out to pursue a further wrestling career Chertow is also a member of the Alpha Epsilon Pi fraternity.

== Camps ==
Chertow conducted summer day camps throughout college and started the Gold Medal Training System upon graduation from Penn State in 1989. During Chertow's first five years conducting camps, he also coached at both Ohio State and Penn State. During his three years at Ohio State, he helped build the Buckeyes wrestling team into a national powerhouse. Ohio State finished 4th and 5th in the 1991 and 1992 NCAA Championships.

== Coaching ==
Chertow returned to Penn State in 1992 and joined the Nittany Lion Coaching Staff. As an assistant coach, Chertow helped the team win the National Dual Meet Championship and place 2nd in the NCAA Championships, which at the time was Penn State's best finish since 1953.

In 1994, Chertow left college coaching to help young people through his local wrestling school and to develop his camp system. Many of Chertow's wrestlers have excelled, winning State and National Championships. From 1998–2010, high school campers won 500+ State Championships, while younger campers won well over 250 AAU, NHSCA, and USA National Championships.

Chertow conducts clinics throughout the country, has produced a series of instructional videos, and is the broadcast analyst for College Sports Television (CSTV) and the Big Ten Network (BTN).

Chertow has also written a motivational book titled, Wrestling: A Commitment to Excellence.

== Accomplishments ==
- 3X Academic All American
- 3X NCAA All American
- 2X Junior National Champion
- 2X Junior World Champion (team and individual)
- Midlands Champion & OW
- Elected to Midlands Hall of Fame
- Olympic Festival Champion
- U.S. National Team Competitor for 7 Consecutive Seasons
- 200+ USAW, NHSCA & AAU National Champions
- Tulsa National Team Championship
- Wrestling USA National Champions
- Gold Medal Training Camp 1989-2008
- 50+ H.S. State Champs 1998-2008
- Featured Clinician at: NCAA Coaches Clinic, NWCA National Convention
- Penn State Coach
- Ohio State Coach
- National Dual
- Big Ten & CBS Expert Analyst
- Broadcaster of the Year

== See also ==
- List of Pennsylvania State University Olympians
