= Jim Thornton =

American announcer and voice actor (born 1964/5)

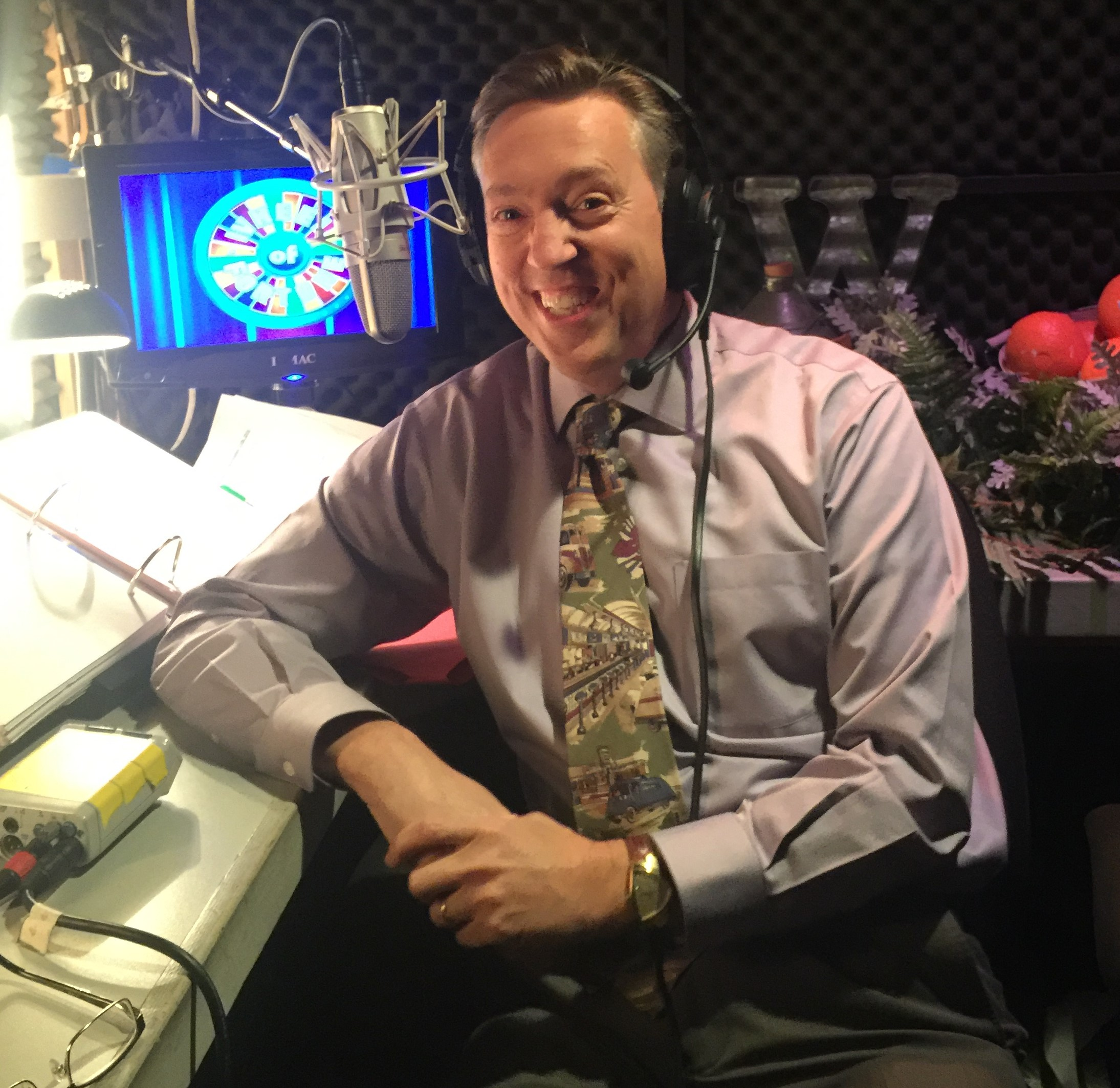
- Thornton in 2016
- Born: 1964 or 1965 (age 61–62); Huntington, West Virginia, U.S.
- Occupation: Radio/television announcer
- Years active: 1985–2026
- Spouse: Sue Thornton
- Children: 1

Jim Thornton (born 1964 or 1965) is an American former radio and television announcer, news anchor, and voice actor. He is known for his voiceover work in video games, movies and television shows. He served as the announcer of Wheel of Fortune, following the death of longtime announcer Charlie O'Donnell, from 2011 until he was fired in September 2026.

== Early life and education ==
Born in Huntington, West Virginia, Jim Thornton graduated from Huntington High School in 1983 and then moved to Los Angeles in 1984, where he started his broadcasting career a year later. He also has a degree in linguistics from Marshall University.

== Career ==
=== Radio ===
Thornton was the afternoon anchor on all-news radio KNX 1070 in Los Angeles, having been promoted from traffic reporting. He has also announced on Celebrity Deathmatch and narrated a portion of Monsters, Inc.

=== Game show announcer ===
Thornton did substitute announcing work on The Price Is Right following the death of former announcer Rod Roddy in 2003. In December 2010, he auditioned for the same role on Wheel of Fortune following the death of the show's announcer Charlie O'Donnell, and was confirmed as the show's new announcer on June 13, 2011. Because of this job, Thornton has scaled back from his job at KNX. Thornton also assumed the role of announcer on the spin-off Celebrity Wheel of Fortune when it began in 2021.

Thornton switched places with host Pat Sajak on the episode of Wheel of Fortune airing April 26, 2023, hosting the bonus round while Sajak served as announcer. This was done as a contestant named Sarah Ward, who was a fan of Thornton, wanted to meet him in-person.

On April 17, 2026, Thornton made a cameo appearance on Spain's version of Wheel of Fortune, La Ruleta de la Suerte (The Wheel of Fortune), to celebrate its 20th anniversary.

=== 2026 firing and aftermath ===
In May 2026, a female passenger on a flight with Thornton alleged that "...she could see Thornton's laptop during the flight and described what she saw as disturbing messages and images in a pedophile chatroom that appeared to involve discussions about children." The crew alerted authorities after being provided evidence. Law enforcement officers questioned Thornton after the flight, after which he was permitted to leave the airport. Sony announced an investigation into Thornton, as well as Thornton's suspension from Wheel, on September 1, 2026. Sony also announced it would "recast" his role.

On September 3, 2026, TMZ released pictures of Thornton viewing a chat forum using the anonymous browser Tor with some exchanges referencing sexual content, including a mention of minors, and a link to an Instagram post highlighting the arrest of a man in London for viewing indecent images of children on his phone while on public transportation. Thornton's lawyer, Allison Hart, released a statement denouncing TMZ's report, stating Thornton "...did not engage in any illegal conduct, was not arrested, and has not been charged with any crime ... when questioned about the complaint made by a fellow passenger on the flight, law enforcement spoke to him for five minutes or less, immediately determined that no wrongdoing had occurred and told my client he was free to go." Hart claimed Thornton was trying to access resources for people experiencing suicidal thoughts, and had been sent a link to the wrong chatroom, went on to say that the website in question is "not unlawful, there is no unlawful child pornography or other pedophilic content, and [Thornton] has never viewed, downloaded or consumed any child pornography whether on that commercial flight in May or at any other time."

Thornton was officially fired from Wheel of Fortune the next day. His parts in the then-upcoming 44th season, which had already begun taping, were re-recorded by an interim announcer; as of his firing, no new announcer had been chosen. Brittany Sims of TV Insider commented on edits that appeared to remove Thornton from a September 2026 episode, additionally stating that the interim announcer was "believed to be" Marc Elmer.

== Personal life ==
Thornton has been married to Sue Thornton since the late 1990's. They have a son, Sam, who was diagnosed with Type 1 diabetes in 2009.

== Filmography ==
=== TV series ===
Year	Title	Role	Notes
1985–2011	KNX 1070 Newsradio	Afternoon Anchor	Left both roles in 2011 to work full time on Wheel of Fortune.
1996–2011	CBS 2 News	Traffic Reporter for KCBS-TV	Left both roles in 2011 to work full time on Wheel of Fortune.
2004	The Price Is Right	Try-Out Announcer	10 episodes
2004	The Soup	Announcer	1 episode
2006-2007	Celebrity Deathmatch	Johnny Gomez	16 episodes
2009	The Cleveland Show	Announcer	2 episodes
2010	Tim & Eric Awesome Show, Great Job!	Announcer	Episode: "Comedy"
2010–2026	Wheel of Fortune	Announcer	2,987 episodes
2021–2026	Celebrity Wheel of Fortune	Announcer	75 episodes (10 of which are streaming exclusive)

=== Shorts ===
Year	Title	Role	Notes
2009	Let's Pollute	Narrator	

=== Movies ===
Year	Title	Role	Notes
2001	Monsters, Inc.	Commercial Narrator	

=== Video games ===
Year	Title	Role	Notes
2006	Hitman: Blood Money	Additional voices	
2008	WALL-E	Old-Time Announcer	
2010	Mafia II	DJ	
2012	Wheel of Fortune	Announcer	
