= William "Red" Dawson =

American football player and coach (born 1942)

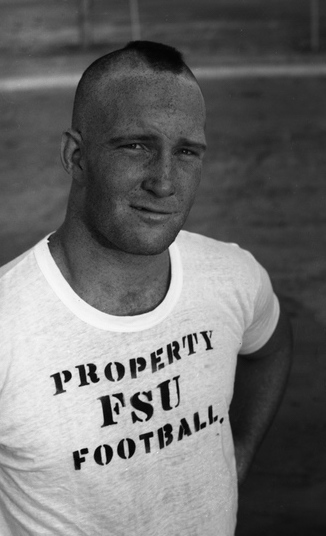
- Dawson in 1964

No. 83, 88
- Positions: Tight end, Defensive end

Personal information
- Born: December 4, 1942 (age 83); Valdosta, Georgia, U.S.
- Listed height: 6 ft 3 in (1.91 m)
- Listed weight: 240 lb (109 kg)

Career information
- High school: Valdosta
- College: Florida State (1960-1964)
- NFL draft: 1964: 12th round, 161st overall pick
- AFL draft: 1964: 19th round, 148th overall pick

Career history

Playing
- Boston Patriots (1965); Orlando Panthers (1966); Arkansas Diamonds (1968)

Coaching
- Marshall (1968–1970) Defensive coordinator; Marshall (1970–1971) Acting head coach; Marshall (1971) Defensive coordinator

Career AFL statistics
- Games played: 9
- Stats at Pro Football Reference

William Alfred "Red" Dawson (born December 4, 1942) is an American former professional football player and college coach. He played college football for the Florida State Seminoles before playing professionally for the Boston Patriots of the American Football League (AFL). After his playing career, Dawson was a defensive coordinator for the Marshall Thundering Herd. He was nicknamed "Red" for his red hair.

== Playing career ==
The Valdosta, Georgia, native attended Florida State University and was an All-America at both tight end and defensive end. He was selected by both the NFL's Los Angeles Rams (12th round, 161st overall) and AFL's Boston Patriots (19th round, 148th overall), but signed with the Patriots. He played nine games for Boston before being released on November 10, 1965.

In 1966, Dawson played for the Orlando Panthers of the Continental Football League.

== Coaching career ==
In 1968, Dawson was hired by new Marshall head coach Perry Moss as receivers coach. Dawson had previously played for Moss as a member of the Orlando Panthers. After the season, which saw the Thundering Herd post a 0–9–1 record, allegations of rules violations and broken promises came to light and were proven true. Ultimately Marshall was found guilty of over 100 National Collegiate Athletic Association rules violations and was later expelled from the Mid-American Conference. Moss was fired, and former assistant Rick Tolley was named his successor.

On November 14, 1970, the Thundering Herd traveled to Kinston, North Carolina, via a Douglas DC-9 chartered to take the team, coaches, school officials, and boosters to the game against the East Carolina Pirates and back home. The Herd lost, 17–14, on a controversial intentional grounding call against quarterback Ted Shoebridge on the last play of the game. En route back to Huntington, West Virginia, Southern Airways Flight 932 clipped some trees on approach to Tri-State Airport, and the plane crashed nearly vertically into a ravine short of the runway. All 75 people on board were killed, including 37 players and five of the eight coaches of the team.

Dawson was one of the few members of the team who was not on the plane; he and coach Gail Parker were on a pre-planned recruiting trip to see a linebacker named Billy Joe Mantooth at Ferrum Junior College in Ferrum, Virginia. Dawson had driven to the East Carolina game and was to drive to Ferrum from Greenville at the game's conclusion. However, en route, Dawson and Parker heard about the crash on the radio. Mantooth eventually signed with West Virginia University.

After the crash and the funerals and memorials for the dead, Marshall University decided to rebuild a football team. Dawson was named acting head coach until Jack Lengyel was hired as head coach on St. Patrick's Day, 1971. Lengyel persuaded Dawson to stay on as an assistant. The 1971 season, in which the Thundering Herd won two emotional home games, was Dawson's last full season. Dawson resigned in the fall of 1972 and never returned to coaching. In the years since he has been suffering from "survivor guilt".

== Popular culture ==
Red Dawson was portrayed by Matthew Fox in the 2006 Warner Bros. motion picture We Are Marshall, though the film incorrectly claims Dawson gave up his place on the plane to Deke Brackett. In reality, Gail Parker was the one giving up his place.

Dawson himself played a non-speaking cameo role in the film, playing the head coach of Marshall's opponent, Morehead State University, in the first game of the 1971 season, a 29-6 loss.

== See also ==
- List of teachers portrayed in films
