= Spring Hill Cemetery (Huntington, West Virginia) =

Cemetery in Huntington, West Virginia

Details
- Established: 1874
- Location: 1427 Norway Ave, Huntington, West Virginia 25705
- Owned by: Greater Huntington Park and Recreation District
- Size: 110 acres
- No. of graves: +80,000
- Website: Official website
- Find a Grave: Spring Hill Cemetery

Spring Hill Cemetery is a historic cemetery in Huntington, West Virginia. Established in 1874, Spring Hill Cemetery's oldest grave is dated 1838, with the first official burial being 1873.

== Notable burials ==
The Southern Airways Flight 932 memorial at Spring Hill Cemetery in 2006.

- 1861 - Albert G. Jenkins, former United States House of Representatives
- 1875 - Peter Cline Buffington, first mayor of Huntington, West Virginia
- 1886 - Charles B. Hoard, former United States House of Representatives
- 1900 - Eustace Gibson, former Speaker of the West Virginia House of Delegates
- 1905 - Delos W. Emmons, co-founder of Huntington, West Virginia
- 1930 - James A. Hughes, former United States House of Representatives
- 1940 - Eloise Hughes Smith, 1912 RMS Titanic disaster survivor
- 1954 - Skeeter Shelton, former Major League Baseball Outfielder
- 1959 - Will E. Neal, former United States House of Representatives

=== The Marshall Plane Crash ===
In 1970, the Southern Airways Flight 932 was carrying 37 members of the Marshall University Thundering Herd football team, eight members of the coaching staff, 25 boosters, two pilots, two flight attendants, and a charter coordinator. The team was returning home after a 17–14 loss to the East Carolina Pirates at Ficklen Stadium in Greenville, North Carolina. A mass funeral was held at the field house and many of the dead were buried at the Spring Hill Cemetery, some together because bodies were not identifiable.

== Popular culture ==
One of the final scenes of We Are Marshall took place next to the Southern Airways Flight 932 memorial, as the team went into their first game after the crash.
