= Marshall University Memorial Fountain =

- U.S. National Register of Historic Places
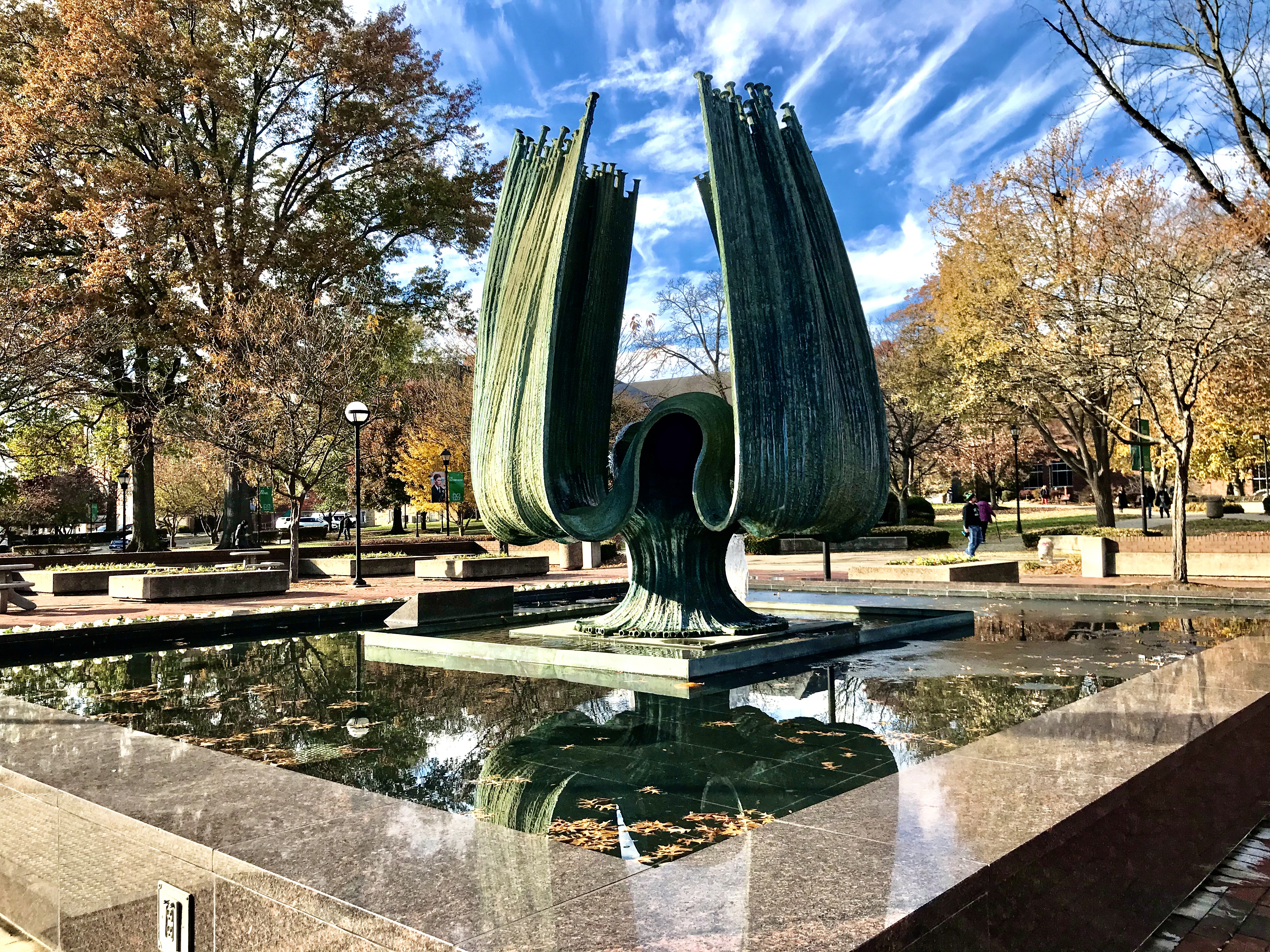
- Marshall University Memorial Fountain in 2020.

- Location within West Virginia Location within the United States
- Location: 1 John Marshall Dr, Huntington, West Virginia 25755
- Coordinates: 38°25′22″N 82°25′44″W
- Built: November 12, 1972
- Architect: Harry Bertoia
- NRHP reference No.: 100010591
- Added to NRHP: July 19, 2024

The Marshall University Memorial Fountain is a memorial fountain next to the Memorial Student Center, in Huntington, West Virginia. The fountain was listed on the National Register of Historic Places on July 19, 2024.

Designed by Harry Bertoia, the fountain stands 13 feet tall and weighs over 6,500 pounds. Finished in 1972, the fountain was built in memory of the Marshall Plane Crash on November 14, 1970. A plaque includes the names of all 75 victims – 37 Marshall football team members, 5 coaches, 7 staff members, 21 supporters, and 5 crew members.

Every year, on the anniversary of the crash, the fountain is shut off during a commemorative ceremony and not activated again until the following spring.

== Popular culture ==
The fountain can be seen in multiple parts of:

- Marshall University: Ashes to Glory, a documentary by Deborah Novak and John Witek, was released on November 18, 2000, about the crash and the subsequent recovery of the Marshall football program in the decades following.
- We Are Marshall, a film dramatizing the crash of Flight 932 and its repercussions, premiered on December 12, 2006, in Huntington.

== See also ==
- National Register of Historic Places listings in Cabell County, West Virginia
