= Billy Joe Mantooth =

American football player (1951–1986)

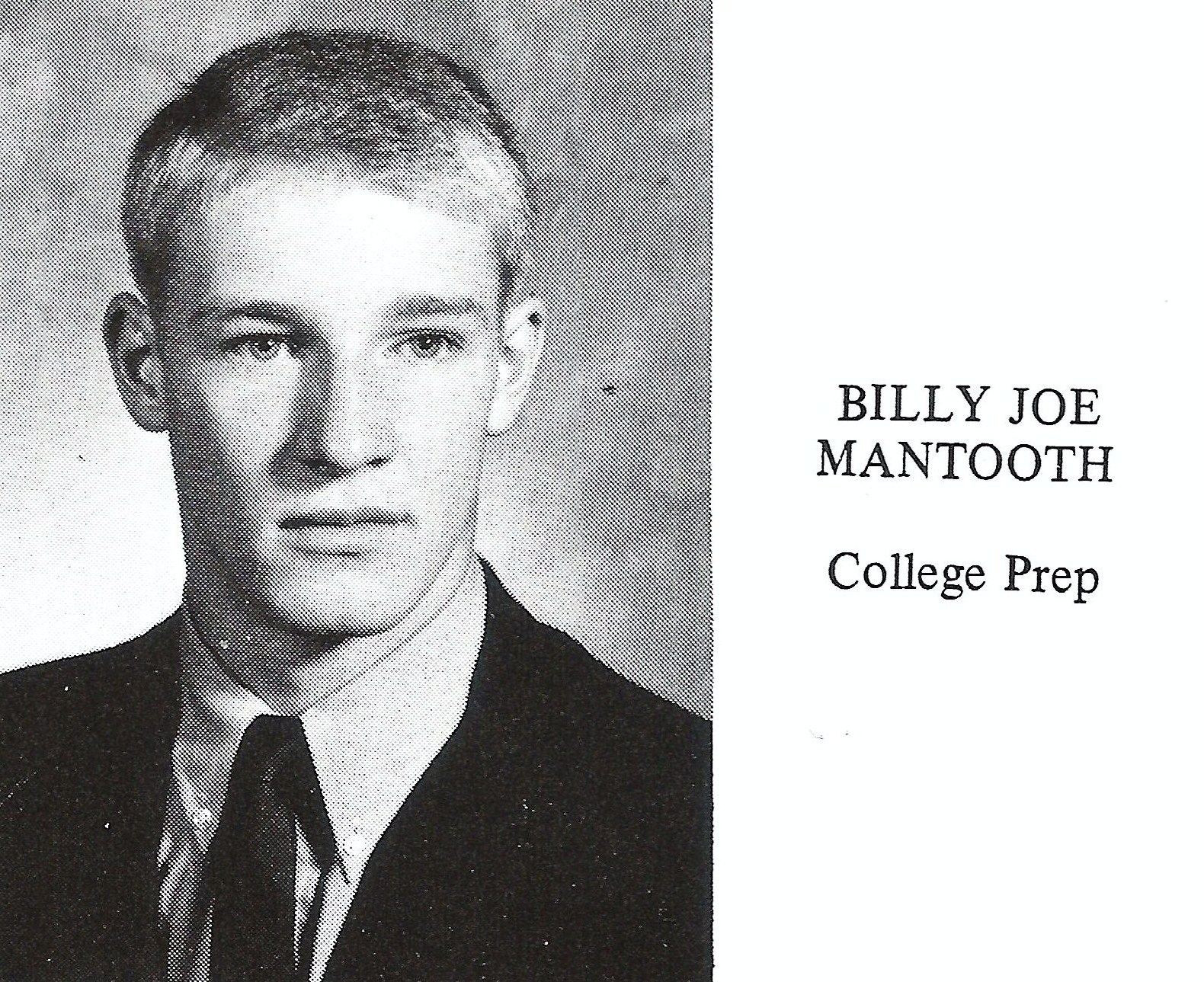
- Mantooth in his 1969 high school yearbook

Profile
- Position: Linebacker

Personal information
- Born: 1951
- Died: July 23, 1986 near Sutton, West Virginia, U.S.
- Listed height: 6 ft 2 in (1.88 m)
- Listed weight: 225 lb (102 kg)

Career information
- High school: Herbert Hoover
- College: Ferrum; West Virginia (1971–1972)
- NFL draft: 1973: undrafted

Career history
- Philadelphia Eagles (1973)*; Houston Oilers (1974–1975)
- * Offseason or practice squad member only

Awards and highlights
- NJCAA All-American (1970)

Billy Joe Mantooth (1951 – July 23, 1986) was an American professional football linebacker from Clendenin, West Virginia. Nicknamed "the Man-Eater", he played junior college football at Ferrum College and received NJCAA All-American honors in 1970. He transferred to West Virginia University, where he lettered in 1971 and 1972. Mantooth spent the 1973 preseason with the Philadelphia Eagles and was subsequently associated with the Houston Oilers during the 1974 and 1975 seasons. Mantooth is also known for his indirect role in keeping two Marshall University football staffers, who were on a recruiting trip to see him, off of Southern Airways Flight 932; the chartered flight crashed on its return trip to West Virginia and killed all 75 people aboard.

Mantooth died in a single-vehicle crash on Interstate 79 near Sutton, West Virginia, on July 23, 1986.

== Playing career ==
=== High school ===
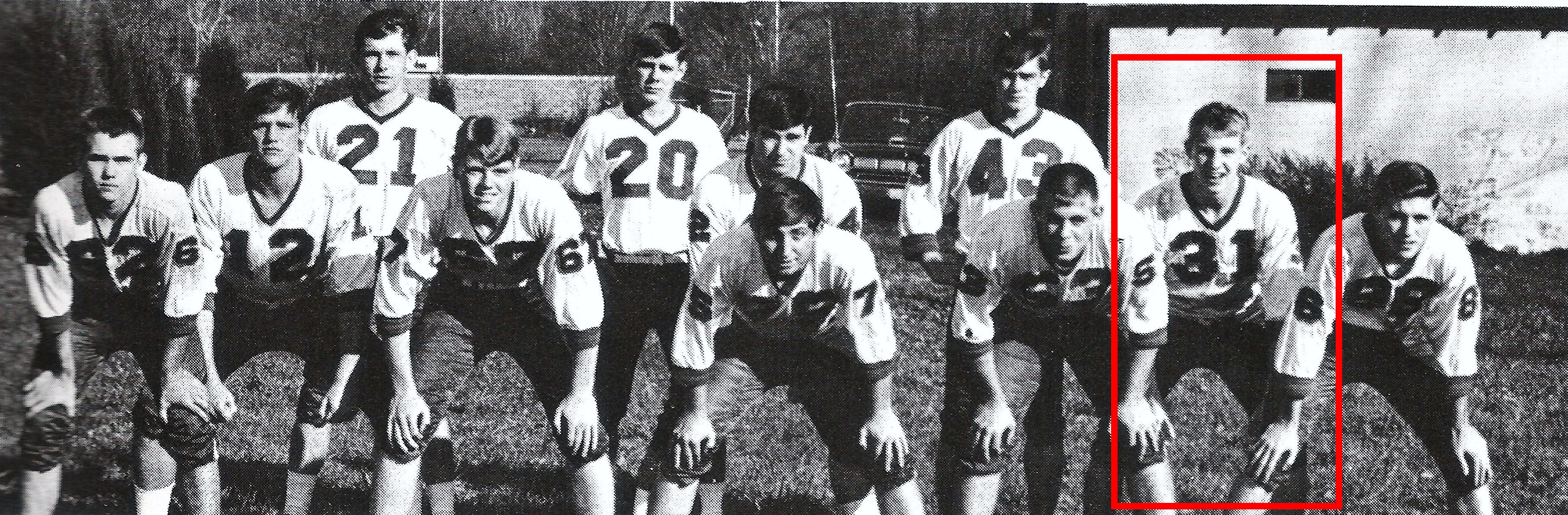
Mantooth (highlighted), wearing No. 31 with Herbert Hoover's starting defensive unit in the school's 1969 yearbook

Mantooth attended Herbert Hoover High School and was a member of its 1969 graduating class. On the football team, he wore No. 31 and was pictured in the school's yearbook with the starting defensive unit.

=== College ===
Mantooth began his college career as a linebacker at Ferrum Junior College. He received NJCAA All-America honors in 1970.

Following Marshall's game at East Carolina on November 14, 1970, Marshall coaches Red Dawson and Gail Parker traveled by car to Ferrum to recruit Mantooth. Dawson had driven to Greenville, while Parker had flown with the team and traded places for the return trip with assistant coach Deke Brackett, who had traveled with Dawson. The recruiting trip kept Dawson and Parker off Southern Airways Flight 932, which crashed near Tri-State Airport while returning to West Virginia, killing all 75 people aboard, including Brackett.

Mantooth subsequently transferred to West Virginia. He lettered at linebacker in 1971 and 1972 and was listed as the starting middle linebacker for the 1972 season opener against Villanova.

In West Virginia's 1972 game against Penn State, Bob Nagle was awarded a touchdown on a play that a 2009 WVU Athletics retrospective described as a fumble recovered by Mantooth and Dennis Harris at the 3-yard line.

=== Professional career ===
Mantooth joined the Philadelphia Eagles as a free agent in 1973 after head coach Mike McCormack noticed him at an NFL free-agent camp in April. The Eagles released him in July, before the regular season began.

The Philadelphia Bell selected Mantooth in the 37th round of the World Football League's 1974 pro draft. He subsequently joined the Houston Oilers. The Oilers released him in November 1974 after he sustained a leg injury; West Virginia University records also list him with Houston in 1975.

== Post-playing career ==
On April 7, 1981, Mantooth was involved in an altercation with former NFL player Dan Fowler at a health club in Lexington, Kentucky. In the criminal case, Mantooth was found guilty of punching Fowler and fined $500. An ensuing civil case filed by Fowler, Fowler v. Mantooth, made it to the Kentucky Supreme Court in 1984, where a $20,000 punitive-damages award against Mantooth was reinstated after having previously been overturned by the Court of Appeals.

== Personal life and death ==
Mantooth was married to Pamela, with whom he had a daughter, Michelle.

Mantooth died on July 23, 1986, his 35th birthday, in a single-vehicle crash on Interstate 79 near Sutton, West Virginia. He was living in Bridgeport, West Virginia, and was employed by Metec Inc. of Lexington, Kentucky, at the time of his death.
