= Southern Airways Flight 932 =

1970 aircraft accident in West Virginia

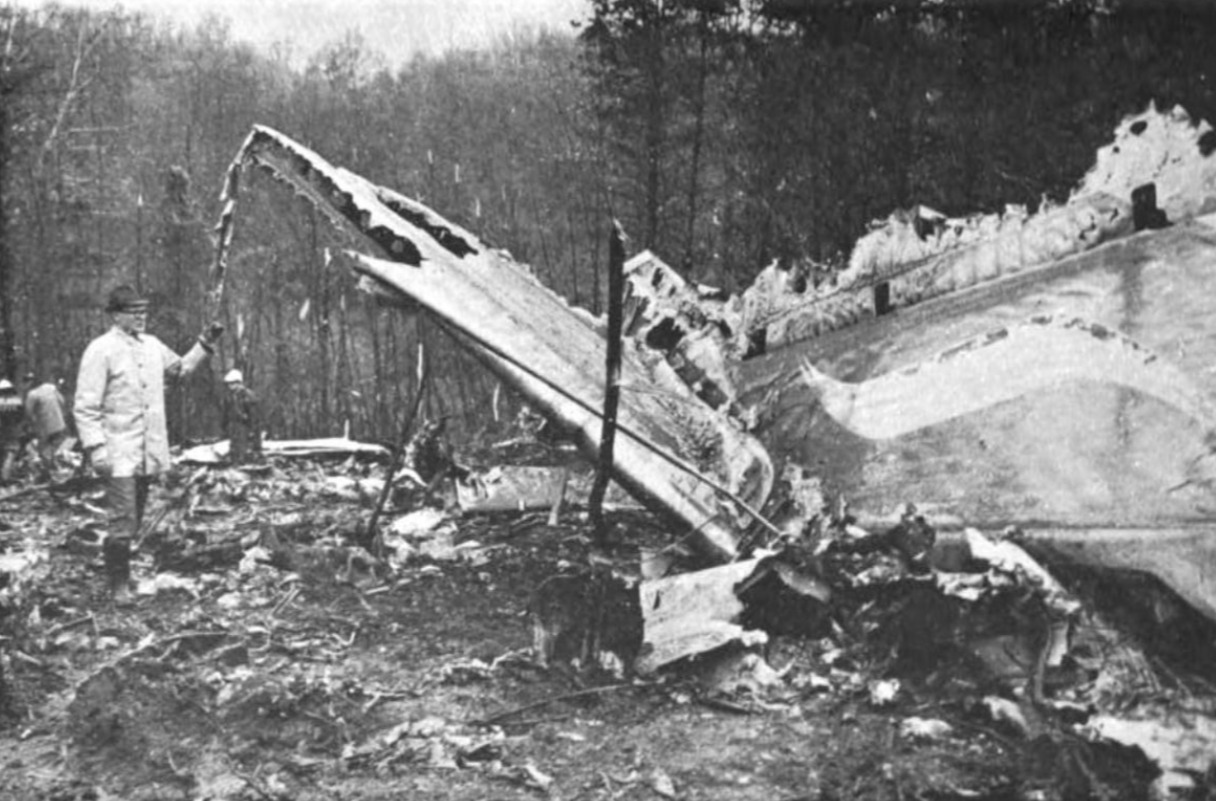
- Wreckage of the aircraft

Accident
- Date: November 14, 1970
- Summary: Controlled flight into terrain
- Site: Near Tri-State Airport, Huntington, West Virginia, US; 38°22′27″N 82°34′42″W

Aircraft
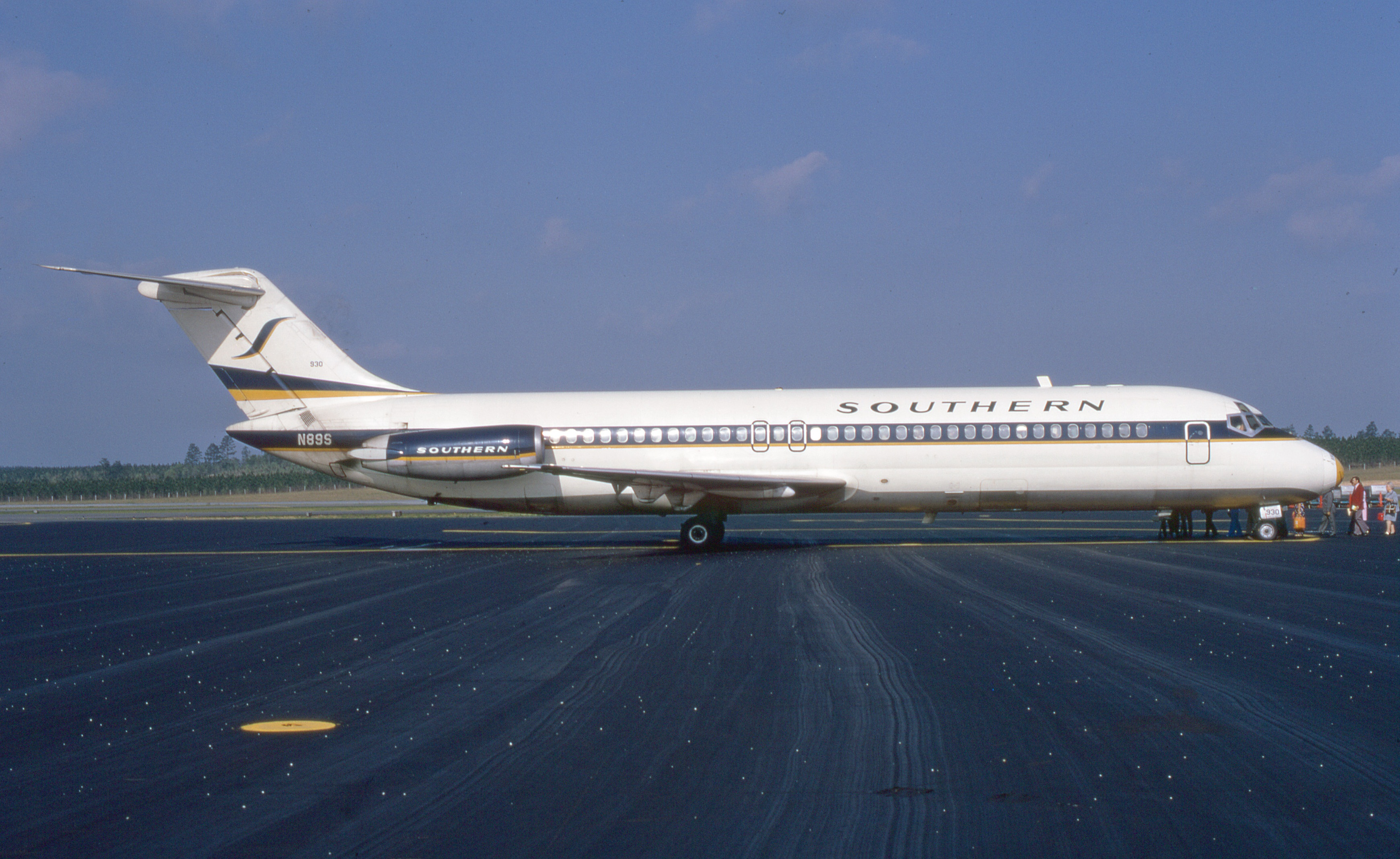
- A Southern Airways Douglas DC-9-31, similar to the one involved in the accident
- Aircraft type: Douglas DC-9-31
- Operator: Southern Airways
- IATA flight No.: SO932
- ICAO flight No.: SOU932
- Call sign: SOUTHERN 932
- Registration: N97S
- Flight origin: Kinston Regional Jetport, Kinston, North Carolina
- 1st stopover: Tri-State Airport, Huntington, West Virginia
- 2nd stopover: Hopkinsville-Christian County Airport, Hopkinsville, Kentucky
- Last stopover: Alexandria International Airport, Alexandria, Louisiana
- Destination: Ryan Field, Baton Rouge, Louisiana
- Occupants: 75
- Passengers: 71
- Crew: 4
- Fatalities: 75
- Survivors: 0

Southern Airways Flight 932 was a chartered Southern Airways twin engine McDonnell Douglas DC-9-30 domestic United States commercial jet flight from Stallings Field (ISO) in Kinston, North Carolina, to Huntington Tri-State Airport/Milton J. Ferguson Field (HTS) near Kenova and Ceredo, West Virginia. At 7:36 pm on November 14, 1970, the aircraft crashed into a hill just short of the Tri-State Airport, killing all 75 people on board – 37 members of the Marshall University football team, 5 coaches, 7 staff members, 21 boosters, 2 pilots, 2 flight attendants, and a charter coordinator. The team was returning home after a 17–14 loss to the East Carolina Pirates at Ficklen Stadium in Greenville, North Carolina. The accident is the deadliest tragedy for any sports team in US history.

It was the second college football team plane crash in a little over a month, after a crash on October 2nd that killed 14 Wichita State players, head coach Ben Wilson, and 16 others.

== Aircraft and crew ==
The aircraft was a 95-seat, twin-jet engine McDonnell Douglas DC-9-30 with tail registration N97S. The airliner's crew was Captain Frank Abbott (47), First Officer Jerry Smith (28), plus two flight attendants. All were qualified for the flight. This was the only flight that year for the Marshall University football team.

== Events leading to the crash ==
At the time, Marshall's athletic teams rarely traveled by plane, since most away games were within easy driving distance of the campus. In light of the crash of the Wichita State football team just over a month earlier, school officials originally planned to cancel the flight. Instead, they opted to fly on a different plane than the one which crashed in Colorado (a Martin 4-0-4), and chartered the Southern Airways DC-9. The original proposal to charter the flight was refused because it would exceed the takeoff limitations of their aircraft. The subsequent negotiations resulted in a reduction of the weight of passengers and baggage and the charter flight was scheduled. The airliner left Stallings Field at Kinston, North Carolina, and the flight proceeded to Huntington without incident. The crew established radio contact with air traffic controllers at 7:23 pm with instructions to descend to 5,000 ft (1,500 m).

== Accident ==
The controllers advised the crew that "rain, fog, smoke and a ragged ceiling" were at the airport, making landing more difficult, but possible. At 7:34 pm, the airliner's crew reported passing Tri-State Airport's outer marker. The controller gave them clearance to land. The aircraft began its normal descent after passing the outer marker, but did not arrest its descent and hold altitude at 1,240 ft (380 m), as required by the assigned instrument approach procedure. Instead, the descent continued for another 300 ft (91 m) for unknown reasons, apparently without either crew member actually seeing the airport lights or runway. In the transcript of their cockpit communications in the final minutes, the pilots briefly debated that their autopilot had captured the glide slope, although the airport was not equipped with a glide slope. The report also noted that the aircraft approached the Catlettsburg Refinery in the final 30 seconds before impact, which "could have ... affected ... a visual illusion produced by the difference in the elevation of the refinery and the airport," which was nearly 300 ft (91 m) higher than the refinery, with hills in between. The co-pilot, monitoring the altimeter, called out, "It's beginning to lighten up a little bit on the ground here at ... seven hundred feet ... We're two hundred above [approach minimums]," and the charter coordinator, present in the cockpit, replied, "Bet it'll be a missed approach." The flight data recorder shows that the aircraft descended another 220 ft (67 m) within 12 seconds, and the co-pilot calls out "four hundred" and agrees with the pilot they are on the correct approach. In the next second, though, the co-pilot quickly calls out "hundred and twenty-six ... hundred", and the sounds of impact immediately follow.

The airliner collided with the tops of trees on a hillside 5,543 ft (1,690 m) short of runway 11 (now runway 12). The plane burst into flames and created a swath of charred ground 95 ft (29 m) wide and 279 ft (85 m) long. According to the official National Transportation Safety Board (NTSB) report, the accident was "unsurvivable". The aircraft "dipped to the right, almost inverted, and had crashed into a hollow 'nose-first' ". By the time the plane came to a stop, it was 4,219 ft (1,286 m) short of the runway and 275 ft (84 m) south of the middle marker. Although the airport runway has since been lengthened past its original threshold, making historical measurements more difficult, the NTSB official report provides, "the accident occurred during hours of darkness at 38° 22' 27" N. latitude and 82° 34' 42" W. longitude." The report additionally notes, "Most of the fuselage was melted or reduced to a powder-like substance; however, several large pieces were scattered throughout the burned area." The remains of six passengers were never identified.

== Investigation ==
The NTSB investigated the accident and its final report was issued on April 14, 1972. In the report, the NTSB concluded, "the probable cause of this accident was the descent below Minimum Descent Altitude during a nonprecision approach under adverse operating conditions, without visual contact with the runway environment." They further stated, "The Board has been unable to determine the reason for this [greater] descent, although the two most likely explanations are (a) improper use of cockpit instrumentation data, or (b) an altimetry system error." At least one source says that water that had seeped into the plane's altimeter could have thrown off its height readings, leading the pilots to believe the plane was higher than was actually the case.

The board made three recommendations as a result of this accident, including recommendations for heads-up displays, ground proximity warning devices, and surveillance and inspection of flight operations.

== Subsequent events at Marshall ==
On November 15, 1970, a memorial service was held at the indoor, 8,500-seat Veterans Memorial Fieldhouse with moments of silence, remembrances, and prayers. The following Saturday, another memorial service was held at the outdoor, 18,000-seat Fairfield Stadium. Classes at Marshall, along with numerous events and shows by the Marshall Artists Series (and the football team's game against the Ohio Bobcats), were cancelled and government offices were closed. A mass funeral was held at the field house and many of the dead were buried at the Spring Hill Cemetery, some together because bodies were not identifiable.

The effects of the crash on Huntington went far beyond the Marshall campus. Because it was the Herd's only charter flight of the season, boosters and prominent citizens were on the plane, including a city councilman, a state legislator, and four physicians. Seventy children had at least one parent die in the crash, with 18 of them left orphaned.

On St. Patrick's Day, 1971, College of Wooster football coach Jack Lengyel was introduced as Marshall's new head coach. Lengyel said he immediately felt a connection to Marshall when he heard about the crash. In the following weeks, Lengyel's effort to rebuild the team was aided by receivers' coach Red Dawson. Dawson was a coach from the previous staff who had driven back from the East Carolina game along with Gail Parker, a freshman coach. Parker flew to the game, but did not fly back, having switched places with Deke Brackett, another coach. Dawson and Parker were buying boiled peanuts at a country store in rural Virginia when they heard the news over the radio. Before the trip, they were scheduled to go on a recruiting mission to Ferrum College after the ECU–Marshall game, in an ultimately unsuccessful effort to recruit junior college linebacker Billy Joe Mantooth. After the crash, Red Dawson helped bring together a group of players who were on the junior varsity football team during the 1970 season, as well as students and athletes from other sports, to form a 1971 football team.

The NCAA granted Marshall permission to use freshmen on the varsity squad, something which was not normally allowed at the time (the NCAA repealed that prohibition at its annual convention in January 1972). Following its plane crash, Wichita State was granted similar permission to use freshmen on the varsity to resume its 1970 season.

Head coach Rick Tolley was among the crash victims. Marshall approached Penn State assistant Bob Phillips first about the position but he declined. Dick Bestwick, an assistant at Georgia Tech, was approached and accepted the position on February 28 before backing out days later to return to Tech. Lengyel was hired to take Tolley's place on March 11, 1971. Lengyel, who came from a coaching job at the College of Wooster, was hired by the recently hired athletic director Joe McMullen, under whom he had previously worked at the University of Akron in the 1950s.

The Marshall University football team won only two games during the 1971 season, against Xavier and Bowling Green. Lengyel coached the Thundering Herd to a 9–33 record during his tenure, which ended after the 1974 season.

=== Memorials ===
Memorial at Spring Hill Cemetery in Huntington, West Virginia to honor the victims of the 1970 plane crash

Marshall University acting President Donald Dedmon appointed a memorial committee soon after the crash. The committee decided upon one major memorial within the campus, a plaque and memorial garden at Fairfield Stadium, and a granite cenotaph at the Spring Hill Cemetery; the new Memorial Student Center was named as a memorial as well.

On November 12, 1972, the Marshall University Memorial Fountain was dedicated at the entrance of the Memorial Student Center. The sculpture's designer, Harry Bertoia, created the $25,000 memorial using bronze, copper tubing, and welding rods. The 6,500 lb, 13 ft-high (2,900 kg, 4 m-high) sculpture was completed within a year and a half. A plaque was placed on the base on August 10, 1973, listing the names of all 75 victims and concluding:

They shall live on in the hearts of their families and friends forever, and
this memorial records their loss to the university and to the community.

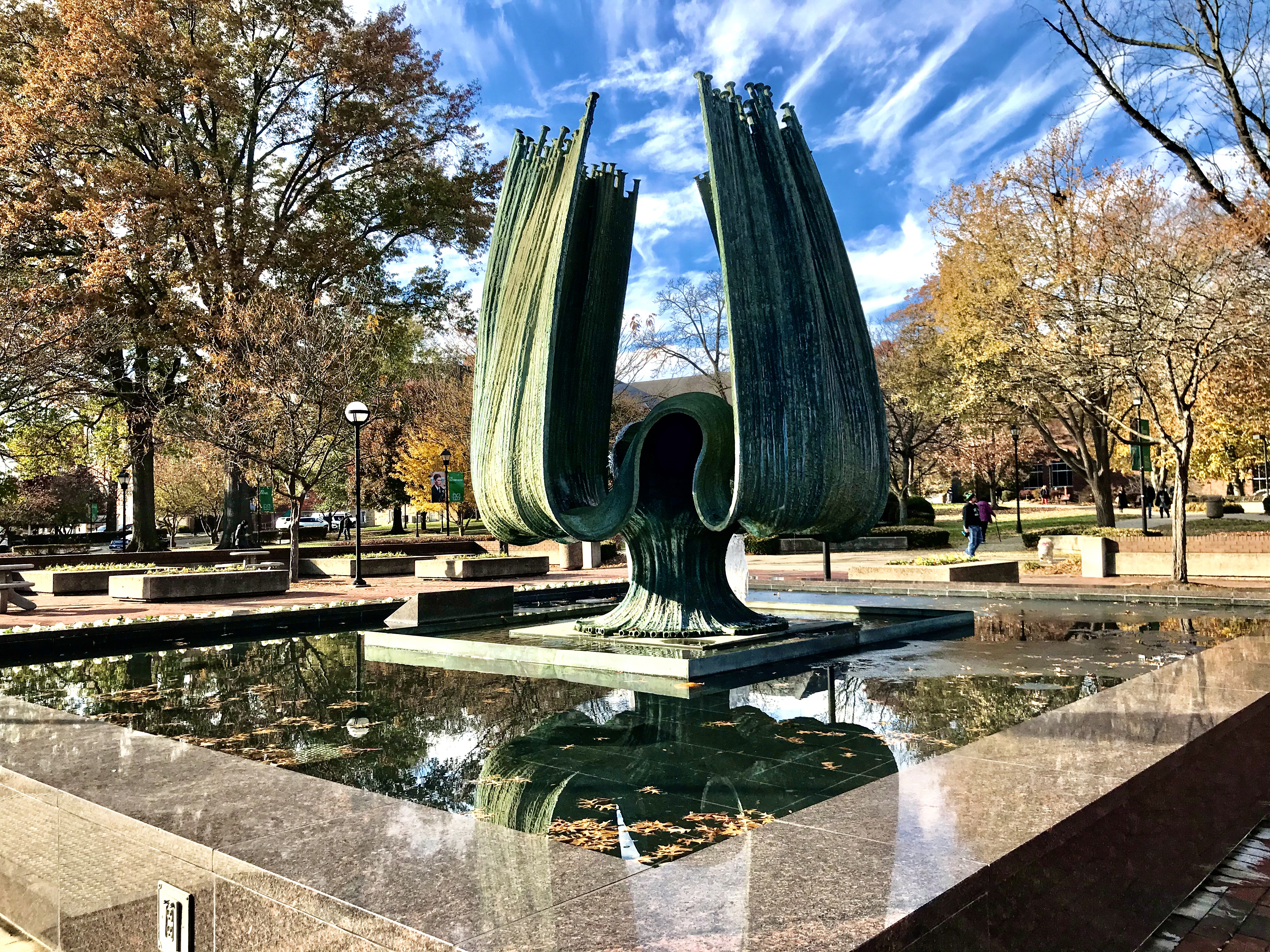
Memorial Fountain on campus outside Memorial Student Center

Every year, on the anniversary of the crash, the fountain is shut off during a commemorative ceremony and not activated again until the following spring. A number of the victims are buried in a grave site in the Spring Hill Cemetery in Huntington. Between the cemetery and Marshall's Joan C. Edwards Stadium, 20th Street was renamed Marshall Memorial Boulevard in honor of the crash victims.

On November 11, 2000, the "We Are Marshall" Memorial Bronze was dedicated. The $150,000 bronze 17×23 ft (5×7 m) statue was created by artist Burl Jones of Sissonville, West Virginia, based upon ideas by John and Ann Krieger of Huntington. It was funded by Marshall fans and is attached to Joan C. Edwards Stadium on the west façade. It was unveiled to thousands, 90 minutes before the game with the Miami University RedHawks.

On December 11, 2006, a memorial plaque was dedicated at the plane crash site. The ceremony featured Dawson and Hardin as guest speakers. The Ceredo and Kenova fire departments were recognized at the event.

The memorial plaque reads (with inaccurate numbers):

On Nov. 14, 1970, 75 people died in the worst sports related air tragedy in U.S. history, when a Southern Airways DC-9 crashed into the hillside nearby. The victims included 36 Marshall University football players, 9 coaches and administrators, 25 fans and air crew of 5. No one survived this horrific disaster.

Another plaque memorializing the 1970 Marshall football team was unveiled at East Carolina University on the same day and can be seen at the guest team entrance of Dowdy–Ficklen Stadium. Featured speakers were Chancellor Steve Ballard, Athletic Director Terry Holland, Pirates' broadcaster Jeff Charles, and Marshall president Stephen J. Kopp.

A memorial bell tower was planned for a location on WV 75 near exit 1 along Interstate 64.

November 14, 2013, marked the first time that Marshall played a road game on an anniversary of the disaster. As a memorial to the 75 victims, the Marshall players wore the number 75 on their helmets. Marshall defeated the Tulsa Golden Hurricane 45–34 that night. The tribute was repeated for the rest of the season, including when Marshall met Rice in the 2013 Conference USA Football Championship Game.

Marshall was scheduled to commemorate the 50th anniversary of the air disaster in their football season opener on August 29, 2020. The opponent was scheduled to be East Carolina, the same team that defeated Marshall before the disaster took place. The anniversary game did not occur due to the COVID-19 pandemic.

During halftime of the 2023 East Carolina–Marshall game, the 1970 ECU Pirates team presented a signed memorial football to Red Dawson and Keith Morehouse, son of Marshall announcer Gene Morehouse, who was killed in the crash.

== In film and television ==
=== Film ===
- Marshall University: Ashes to Glory, a documentary by Deborah Novak and John Witek, was released on November 18, 2000, and is about the crash and the subsequent recovery of the Marshall football program in the decades following.
- We Are Marshall, a film dramatizing the crash and its repercussions, premiered on December 12, 2006, in Huntington. It starred Matthew McConaughey as Jack Lengyel and Matthew Fox as Red Dawson.

=== Television ===
The events of the crash are documented in an episode of Aircrash Confidential titled "Disastrous Descents".

== See also ==
- Alitalia Flight 404 – another DC-9 which clipped trees and crashed nearly inverted before landing in Zurich in 1990
- Humboldt Broncos bus crash
- List of accidents and incidents involving commercial aircraft
- List of accidents involving sports teams
- Southern Airways Flight 242 – the only other fatal Southern Airways accident
- Wichita State University football team plane crash – fatal crash of a plane chartered by a college football that occurred 6 weeks before Southern Airways Flight 932.
