= Sigma Alpha Kappa =

Sigma Alpha Kappa may refer to:

- Sigma Alpha Kappa, a defunct local men's fraternity at Loyola University New Orleans
- Sigma Alpha Kappa, a defunct local men's fraternity of Ferrum College
- Sigma Alpha Kappa, a local men's fraternity at Emory and Henry College
