= Athletic supporter =

Athletic supporter may refer to:

- Jockstrap, an men's undergarment for protection during sports
- Booster club, contributes money to an associated club, sports team, or organization
