= Jake Cabell =

American football coach

Playing career
- 1972: North Carolina Central
- 1975–1976: Nebraska
- Position: Cornerback

Coaching career (HC unless noted)
- 1977–1979: Nebraska (freshmen DC)
- 1980–1986: Eastern Washington (DC)
- 1987–1991: Oregon State (RC)
- 1992: Southwestern (KS)
- 1993: Western Illinois (DB)
- 1995: Iowa Wesleyan (DC/RC/S&C)
- 1996–1999: Tennessee State (DC/RC)
- 2001: Texas Southern (DC)
- 2010: North Carolina Central (DB)
- 2011: West Creek HS (TN)

Head coaching record
- Overall: 5–4 (college)

Jake Cabell is an American football coach and former player.

== Playing career ==
Cabell played cornerback for the Nebraska Cornhuskers under head coach Bob Devaney. He was recruited in the class of 1974 and played during the 1975 and 1976 seasons. Cabel was a junior college transfer because he played for one year at Ferrum College in Ferrum, Virginia, where he earned an associate degree. Before that, he played his freshman year at North Carolina Central.

== Coaching career ==
=== Southwestern ===
Cabell was the 24th football coach for the Southwestern College Moundbuilders in Winfield, Kansas, and held that position for the 1992 season. His coaching record at Southwestern was five wins and four losses.

=== Assistant coaching ===
Cabell has been an assistant coach at various colleges for over 30 years, including Oregon State University, Eastern Washington University, and Tennessee State University, where he served one game in an authority capacity because of the suspension of the head coach. He was an assistant coach at North Carolina Central University in 2010. 2014-(DC)whitwell high school

== Head coaching record ==
Year	Team	Overall	Conference	Standing	Bowl/playoffs
Southwestern Moundbuilders (Kansas Collegiate Athletic Conference) (1992)
1992	Southwestern	5–4	5–3	T–3rd	
Southwestern:		5–4	5–3		
Total:		5–4			
