= We Are Marshall =

2006 film directed by McG

- Theatrical release poster
- Directed by: McG
- Screenplay by: Jamie Linden
- Story by: Jamie Linden; Cory Helms
- Produced by: Basil Iwanyk; McG
- Starring: Matthew McConaughey; Matthew Fox; Ian McShane; Anthony Mackie; Kate Mara; January Jones; Brian Geraghty; David Strathairn
- Cinematography: Shane Hurlbut
- Edited by: Priscilla Nedd-Friendly; Gregg London
- Music by: Christophe Beck
- Production companies: Legendary Pictures; Thunder Road Pictures; Wonderland Sound and Vision
- Distributed by: Warner Bros. Pictures
- Release date: December 22, 2006
- Running time: 131 minutes
- Country: United States
- Language: English
- Budget: $65 million
- Box office: $43.5 million

We Are Marshall is a 2006 American biographical sports drama film directed by McG. It depicts the aftermath of the 1970 plane crash that killed 75 people: 37 players of the Marshall University Thundering Herd football team, five coaches, two athletic trainers, the athletic director, 25 boosters, and the airplane crew of five.

Matthew McConaughey stars as head coach Jack Lengyel, with Matthew Fox as assistant coach William "Red" Dawson, David Strathairn as university president Donald Dedmon, and Robert Patrick as ill-fated Marshall head coach Rick Tolley. Then-governor of Georgia Sonny Perdue has a cameo role as an East Carolina University football coach.

It was scored by Christophe Beck and written by Jamie Linden. The film addressed rebuilding the program and the healing that the community undergoes. Dr. H. Keith Spears was the Marshall University consultant.

We Are Marshall was released by Warner Bros. Pictures on December 22, 2006. The film received mixed to negative reviews from critics and was a box office bomb, grossing $43.5 million against a $65 million budget.

== Plot ==
On the evening of November 14, 1970, Southern Airways Flight 932, a McDonnell Douglas DC-9 chartered by Marshall University to transport the Thundering Herd football team back to Huntington, West Virginia following their 17–14 defeat to the East Carolina University Pirates, clips trees on a ridge just one mile short of the runway at Tri-State Airport in Ceredo, West Virginia, and crashes into a nearby gully, killing all 75 people aboard.

The deceased include the 37 players; head coach Rick Tolley and five members of his coaching staff; Charles E. Kautz, Marshall's athletic director; team athletic trainer Jim Schroer and his assistant, Donald Tackett; sports information director and radio play-by-play announcer Gene Morehouse; 25 boosters; and five crew members.

In the wake of the tragedy, University President Donald Dedmon leans towards indefinitely suspending the football program, but he is ultimately persuaded to reconsider by the pleas of the Marshall students and Huntington residents, and especially the few football players who didn't make the flight, led by Nate Ruffin. Dedmon hires Jack Lengyel as head coach who, with the help of Red Dawson (one of two surviving members of the previous coaching staff) manages to rebuild the team in a relatively short time, despite losing many of their prospects to the West Virginia University Mountaineers. Dedmon travels to Kansas City, where he pleads with the NCAA to waive their rule prohibiting freshmen from playing varsity football (a rule which had been abolished in 1968 for all sports except for football and basketball, and would be abolished for those sports in 1972). Dedmon returns victorious.

The new team is composed mostly of the 18 returning players (three varsity, 15 sophomores), incoming freshmen, and walk-on athletes from other Marshall sports programs. Due to their lack of experience, the "Young Thundering Herd" ends up losing its first game, 29–6, to the Morehead State Eagles. The loss weighs heavily on Dawson and Ruffin, who had been hurt on the first play of the game. The Herd's first post-crash victory is a 15–13 win against Xavier University in the first home game of the season. Hours after the victory a grief-stricken Coach Dawson remains in the team's locker room, in disbelief over the Herd's first win since the crash. He walks out to a still-full stadium of Marshall fans who share his astonishment and don't want to leave the stadium either.

In the film's closing credits, we learn of the futures of each of the film's main characters: Coach Jack Lengyel, Coach Dawson, Nate Ruffin, Reggie Oliver, President Dedmon, Keith Morehouse, and others; and of the eventual success of Marshall football in the decades following the tragedy.

== Cast ==
- Matthew McConaughey as Jack Lengyel
- Matthew Fox as William "Red" Dawson
- Ian McShane as Paul Griffen
- Anthony Mackie as Nate Ruffin
- January Jones as Carole Dawson
- Kimberly Williams-Paisley as Sandy Lengyel
- Brian Geraghty as Tom Bogdan
- David Strathairn as Donald Dedmon
- L. Warren Young as Mickey Jackson
- Arlen Escarpeta as Reggie Oliver
- Kate Mara as Annie Cantrell (cheerleader and narrator)
- Mike Pniewski as Bobby Bowden
- Robert Patrick as Coach Rick Tolley (uncredited)
- Governor of Georgia, Sonny Perdue - Cameo as an East Carolina football coach (uncredited)
- Mayor of Huntington, David Felinton - Cameo as a sports interviewer (uncredited)

== Production ==
=== Filming ===
The memorial at Spring Hill Cemetery in Huntington, West Virginia to the victims of the Southern Airways Flight 932 crash was the site of one of the film's pivotal scenes.

Filming of We Are Marshall commenced on April 3, 2006, in Huntington, West Virginia, and was completed in Atlanta, Georgia. The premiere for the film was held at the Keith-Albee Theatre on December 12, 2006, in Huntington; other special screenings were held at Pullman Square. The movie was released nationwide on December 22, 2006.

=== Historical accuracy ===
==== Dedmon's involvement in the story ====
Donald Dedmon was the acting president of Marshall at the time of the accident. His involvement in hiring Jack Lengyel is not historically documented. John G. Barker was hired as the school's president in early 1971, and started work on March 1, 1971, so Dedmon's firing because of Marshall's return to the football field is inaccurate. Dedmon returned to his job as Vice President of Academic Affairs only three months after the crash, which is the job he held during the 1971 football season. He was hired to be president of Radford College in early 1972.

==== Coaches who turned down the job after interviewing ====
Penn State assistant coach Bob Phillips was a close acquaintance of athletic director Joe McMullen, but took his name out of consideration after visiting Marshall. Dick Bestwick, the freshman coach at Georgia Tech, was actually hired to be the Marshall coach on February 24, 1971 but turned down the job two days later.

=== Closing credits ===
During the final moments of the movie, a voiceover from Annie explains where the program went after that first season, the highs and lows. Actual game footage serves as a backdrop, including a regular season game against the Akron Zips in which offensive linemen carried an injured Byron Leftwich back to the huddle after each play. As the final credits roll, actual footage from the 1970 season is shown, featuring players who perished in the crash. Also shown is news footage from the crash. As the cast credits roll, each actor is shown standing with the real-life person who they portrayed in the film. The film fades out with scenes of Marshall's rise to becoming an NCAA Division 1-AA power in the 1980s and 1990s, and their subsequent jump to Division 1-A (FBS).

== Home media ==
We Are Marshall was released on DVD, HD DVD, and Blu-ray in the United States on September 18, 2007, by Warner Home Video.

== Lawsuit ==
Deborah Novak and John Witek, who produced the 2000 documentary Marshall University: Ashes to Glory, filed a $100 million lawsuit in federal court in California accusing Warner Bros. Pictures and others associated with the We Are Marshall film of fraud, copyright infringement, and breach of contract. Novak, who directed Marshall University: Ashes to Glory, is from Huntington and is a Marshall alumnus. In October 2008, a federal judge dismissed the lawsuit in a summary judgment in favor of Warner Bros.

== Critical reception ==
We Are Marshall received negative reviews from critics and was a box office bomb, grossing only $43.5 million against a budget of $65 million. On Rotten Tomatoes 48% of 126 professional critics gave the film a positive review, with an average rating of 5.8/10. The site's consensus states: "Matthew McConaughey almost runs We Are Marshall to the end zone, but can't stop it from taking the easy, feel-good route in memorializing this historic event in American sports." On Metacritic it has a score of 53% based on reviews from 31 critics, indicating "mixed or average reviews". Audiences polled by CinemaScore gave the film an average grade of "A−" on an A+ to F scale. Overall critics gave the movie a D− on a A+ to F scale.

The film's directing was criticized by many reviewers. Peter Hartlaub, from the San Francisco Chronicle, blamed director McG for "half of the movie problems" and further stated: "He has a kinetic and kitschy style that could make next year's "Hot Wheels" movie a surprise hit, but he's completely out of place here." Peter Howell from the Toronto Star said the film lacked genuine drama or conflict.

McConaughey's performance was seen by critics as one of the film's highlights. Roger Moore from the Orlando Sentinel gave it 4 stars out of 5 and said in his review that "We Are Marshall (it's the rally cry of the team) doesn't always have a handle on the grief, but it does keep emotions close to the surface. That allows McConaughey to be the most refreshing, funny and believable he ever has been."
