= Rick Tolley =

American football player and coach (1940–1970)

Biographical details
- Born: January 6, 1940; Havaco, West Virginia, U.S.
- Died: November 14, 1970 (aged 30); Kenova, West Virginia, U.S.

Playing career
- 1958–1961: Virginia Tech
- Positions: Center, linebacker

Coaching career (HC unless noted)
- 1965–1966: Ferrum (assistant)
- 1968: Wake Forest (DL)
- 1969–1970: Marshall

Head coaching record
- Overall: 6–13

Rickey Dale Tolley (January 6, 1940 – November 14, 1970) was an American football coach. He served as the head football coach at Marshall University during the 1969 and 1970 seasons. He died in the 1970 plane crash that killed all of the crew and passengers, including most of the Marshall football team and coaching staff and several team boosters.

== Early life and playing career ==
Tolley played basketball, baseball, and football at Mullens High School in Mullens, West Virginia. He played college football as a center and linebacker at Virginia Polytechnic Institute and State University.

== Coaching career ==
Tolley started his coaching career in 1962 at John S. Battle High School in Bristol, Virginia as an assistant football coach for two years and then served as an assistant baseball coach at the University of Virginia for another year. He then joined the football coaching staff at Ferrum Junior College for three years, in one of which they won the National Junior College Championship. He then left to become the defensive line coach at Wake Forest University in 1968.

He joined Perry Moss's Marshall football staff as defensive line coach in early 1969, replacing Ken Cooper, who had resigned to coach in Florida. He was interior line coach at the time of Moss's removal from the head coaching duties.

Tolley became the interim head coach of Marshall just four days before the start of fall practice for the 1969 season. He started the season with over 40 players but through attrition, the number of players dropped to just 32 after the team lost the first six games. The team was on its way to a collegiate record losing streak. Tolley was able to turn things around and managed to win three straight games against Bowling Green (21–16), Kent State (31–20) and East Carolina (38–7). The final game of the 1969 season was a loss against Ohio (38–35) with the Bobcats scoring their winning touchdown with five seconds left.

During the entire season Tolley was considered the "acting" head football coach. Tolley had expressed his desire to be the permanent head coach, but the university had not appointed a permanent athletic director and would name a head coach until after the season was complete. Twenty-eight Marshall players had signed a petition and presented it to Governor Arch Moore asking that suspended head coach Perry Moss be named to the top spot. Newly appointed Athletic Director Charles Krautz announced Tolley's selection appointment to the permanent head coaching position on December 1, 1969. His appointment was a unanimous recommendation by a special selection committee submitted to Donald Dedmon, executive vice president of the university, who made the final decision, in an absence of Roland Nelson, Marshall University president who was on vacation.

Tolley was killed in the Marshall football plane crash on November 14, 1970, along with members of his coaching staff and 37 of his football players.

== In media ==
Tolley is depicted in the movie We Are Marshall by actor Robert Patrick (uncredited). Patrick was 18 years older (when the movie was made) than Tolley (at death), causing Tolley to be portrayed in the film as middle-aged.

== Personal life ==
Tolley was married to the former Mary Jane Edmundson of Charlottesville, Virginia from 1963 to his death. The couple had no children. Mary Jane Tolley later moved back to Virginia, where she taught English and creative writing for high school students. She never remarried, and is now retired and living an active life in Richmond. She can be seen in a final scene in the movie We Are Marshall with many people gathered around the university Memorial Water Fountain honoring and remembering the crash victims.

== Head coaching record ==
Year	Team	Overall	Conference	Standing	Bowl/playoffs
Marshall Thundering Herd (NCAA University Division independent) (1969–1970)
1969	Marshall	3–7			
1970	Marshall	3–6			
Marshall:		6–13			
Total:		6–13			
