= Marshall University: Ashes to Glory =

- Directed by: Deborah Novak
- Written by: Deborah Novak; Joe Witek
- Produced by: John Witek
- Music by: Jay Flippin
- Distributed by: West Virginia Public Broadcasting
- Release date: November 18, 2000
- Running time: 119 minutes
- Country: United States
- Language: English

Marshall University: Ashes to Glory is a 2000 documentary film about the November 14, 1970 Marshall University plane crash that killed 75 people (including 37 members of the 1970 Marshall Thundering Herd football team, most of its coaching staff, and a number of school officials and Huntingtonians), and the efforts of new head coach Jack Lengyel and the coaching staff (which included members of the previous staff), to rebuild the team and help heal the city of Huntington, West Virginia.

Marshall University was given special permission by the NCAA to play incoming freshmen at the varsity level for the 1971 season. This team was dubbed the Young Thundering Herd and led by the few upperclassmen who didn't make the trip. Several players from other Marshall sports programs rounded out the team's roster. In the preseason "Green and White Game" versus the Marshall alumni (coached by new athletics director Joe McMullen), the Young Thundering Herd defeated the alums 26-0.

The Young Thundering Herd went on to upset the Xavier Musketeers on the last play of the game: a 13-yard screen pass from quarterback Reggie Oliver to freshman fullback Terry Gardner, in their home opener. In their homecoming game later in the season, the team defeated the ranked Bowling Green Falcons. These were the only two victories of the year for the Thundering Herd.

The Thundering Herd would lose more games during the 1970s than any other school. However, they had their first winning season in twenty years in 1984. That was the beginning of an era of success which saw them win more games in the 1990s — 125 — than any other NCAA Division I school, and win NCAA Division I-AA championships in 1992 and 1996, the latter with an unbeaten season.

Ashes to Glory has won an Emmy Award for best sports documentary.

The day before the official opening, Thundering Herd head coach Bob Pruett asked the filmmakers to give a private screening for the team on the eve of a 2000 Mid-American Conference game against the Miami University RedHawks. The Herd defeated the RedHawks 51-31 on November 11 and went on to win the conference championship game 19–14 over the Western Michigan Broncos on December 2 at Marshall University Stadium, now Joan C. Edwards Stadium.

== We Are Marshall lawsuit ==
Deborah Novak and John Witek filed a $40 million lawsuit in federal court in California accusing Warner Bros. and others associated with the We Are Marshall film of fraud, copyright infringement and breach of contract. Novak, who directed Marshall University: Ashes to Glory, is a Huntington native and Marshall alumna. In October 2008, a federal judge dismissed the lawsuit in a summary judgment in favor of Warner Bros.

== See also ==
- List of American football films
