= Donald Dedmon =

American academic administrator and communications consultant

Donald Newton Dedmon

4th President of Radford University
- In office March 20, 1972 – August 15, 1995
- Preceded by: Charles Knox Martin, Jr.
- Succeeded by: Douglas Covington

Acting President of Marshall University
- In office July 1970 – March 1, 1971
- Preceded by: Roland Nelson
- Succeeded by: John G. Barker

Personal details
- Born: Donald Newton Dedmon; August 13, 1931 Hartville, Missouri, U.S.
- Died: February 13, 1998 (aged 66) Naples, Florida, U.S.
- Spouse: Geraldine Mary Sanders
- Education: Missouri State University (BS); University of Iowa (MA, Ph.D.)

Donald Newton Dedmon (August 13, 1931 – February 13, 1998) was an American academic administrator and communications consultant.

== Early life and education ==
Dedmon was born in Wright County, Missouri, and received his undergraduate degree English and speech from Southwest Missouri State College (now Missouri State University) in 1953, and taught high school before earning a Master of Arts degree in speech in 1956 and a PhD in oral education from the University of Iowa in 1961.

== Career ==
He taught at Saint Cloud State College, in St. Cloud, Minnesota, from 1959 to 1962 and at Southern Illinois University, in Carbondale, Illinois from 1962 to 1964. He later became chair of the Department of Speech at Colorado State University. From 1966 to 1968, he served as a communications consultant for pharmaceutical company Smith, Kline & French.

Dedmon became the dean of the College of Arts and Sciences at Marshall University in 1968, and was appointed executive vice president the following year, becoming acting president of the University in 1970. In this role, he led the campus through the November 14, 1970, plane crash in which 37 members of the Marshall University Thundering Herd football team, eight members of the coaching staff, and 25 school boosters were killed. The team was returning home after a 17-14 loss against the East Carolina University Pirates at Ficklen Stadium in Greenville, North Carolina. Dedmon was portrayed by David Strathairn in the movie We Are Marshall, which details the aftermath of the crash and its effect on the school community.

Dedmon became president of Radford University on March 20, 1972, and served for more than twenty years, during which time the University experienced rapid growth and a major transition from a small women's college to a co-ed institution, before reaching university status in 1979. The enrollment tripled during his tenure.

Dedmon spent much of the early 1990s away from Radford University on sabbatical in Hawaii in and later on medical leave during a lengthy recovery at his beach house in South Carolina following major surgery due to a ruptured spleen.

Due to ill health Dedmon announced his retirement from Radford University in June 1994, but officially held the presidency while on medical leave until August 1995. His last public appearance at Radford University was in September 1995, when he spoke at the inauguration of his successor, Douglas Covington.

The Dedmon Center at Radford University was named in his honor. The 58,000-square-foot athletic center opened in 1981 and was renovated in 2009.

In 2018, Dedmon was posthumously inducted in the Radford University Athletics Hall of Fame.

== Personal life ==
Dedmon married Geraldine Mary Sanders, a native of Canada in 1957. They had two daughters. After retiring from Radford University, Dedmon moved to South Florida where he spent the remainder of his life. He died in Naples, Florida in 1998 at the age of 66.

== See also ==
- List of presidents and principals of Marshall University
