= Deke Brackett =

American football player and coach (1911–1970)

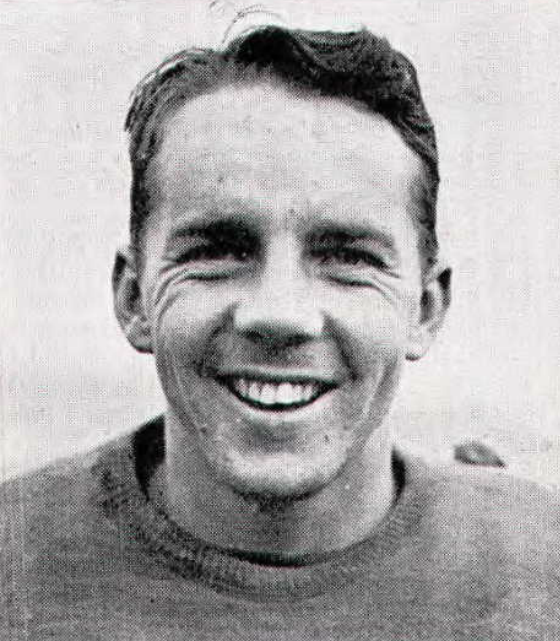
- Brackett from 1933 Volunteer

Biographical details
- Born: January 2, 1911
- Died: November 14, 1970 (aged 59); Kenova, West Virginia, U.S.

Playing career
- 1931–1933: Tennessee
- Position: Quarterback

Coaching career (HC unless noted)
- 1934–1936: Tennessee (assistant)
- 1937–1939: The Citadel (assistant)
- 1940: Hampden–Sydney (assistant)
- 1941–1945: Tennessee (assistant)
- 1946–1949: Arkansas (ends)
- 1950–1962: UCLA (backfield)
- 1967: Orlando Panthers (assistant)
- 1968–1970: Marshall (K/freshman coord.)

Herbert Benjamin "Deke" Brackett (January 2, 1911 – November 14, 1970) was an American football player and coach.

Brackett played quarterback at the University of Tennessee from 1931 to 1933. He played in the same backfield as halfback Beattie Feathers, future College Football Hall of Famer and NFL All-Decade Team member. After graduating, Brackett remained at Tennessee as an assistant. After stints at The Citadel and Hampden-Sydney, he returned to Tennessee as an assistant to new head coach John Barnhill. Brackett followed Barnhill to Arkansas in 1946. Following Barnhill's resignation after the 1949 season, Brackett moved to UCLA where he was the Bruins' backfield coach until 1962.

Brackett returned to coaching as an assistant with the Orlando Panthers of the Continental Football League. He returned to college football in 1968 when his head coach with the Panthers, Perry Moss hired him to work on his staff at Marshall University.

Brackett died in the 1970 plane crash that killed most of the Marshall football team and coaching staff and several team boosters. Brackett was supposed to go on a recruiting trip with fellow assistant William "Red" Dawson, however graduate assistant Gail Parker gave Brackett his seat and went on the recruiting trip instead.
