= Matthew Fox =

American actor (born 1966)

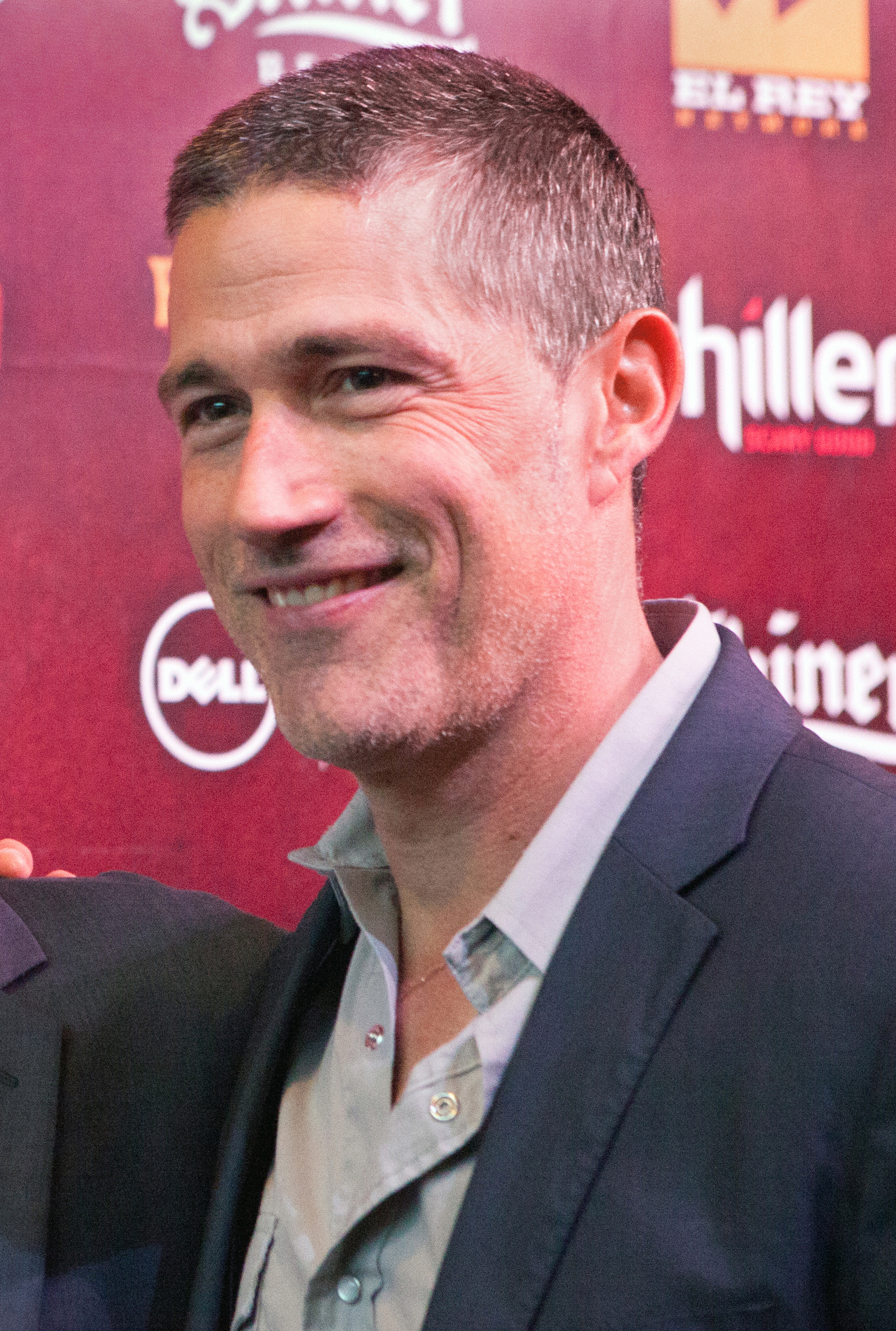
- Fox in 2015
- Born: Matthew Chandler Fox; July 14, 1966 (age 60); Abington, Pennsylvania, U.S.
- Education: Columbia University (BA)
- Occupation: Actor
- Years active: 1992–2015, 2021–present
- Spouse: Margherita Ronchi (m. 1992)
- Children: 2

Matthew Chandler Fox (born July 14, 1966) is an American actor. He is known for his roles as Charlie Salinger on Party of Five (1994–2000) and Jack Shephard on the drama series Lost (2004–2010), the latter of which earned him Golden Globe Award and Primetime Emmy Award nominations. Fox has also performed in feature films, including We Are Marshall (2006), Vantage Point (2008), Alex Cross (2012), Emperor (2012) and Bone Tomahawk (2015).

== Early life ==
Fox was born in Abington, Pennsylvania, the son of Loretta B. (née Eagono) and Francis G. Fox. He has two brothers, Francis, Jr. (b. 1961) and Bayard (b. 1969). One of his paternal great-great-great-grandfathers was Union General George Meade. His father was from a "very blue-blood" Pennsylvania family of mostly English descent, while his mother was of half Italian and half British ancestry. The second of three boys, Fox's family moved to Wyoming when he was a year old. They settled in Crowheart, Wyoming, on the Wind River Indian Reservation. His mother was a teacher, and his father, who had been a consultant for an oil company, raised longhorn cattle and horses, and grew barley for Coors beer. Fox attended Wind River High School in Morton, Wyoming, graduating in 1984, then attended Deerfield Academy for a postgraduate year. He graduated from Columbia University with a B.A. in economics in 1989. While at Columbia, he was a wide receiver on the school's football team.

== Career ==
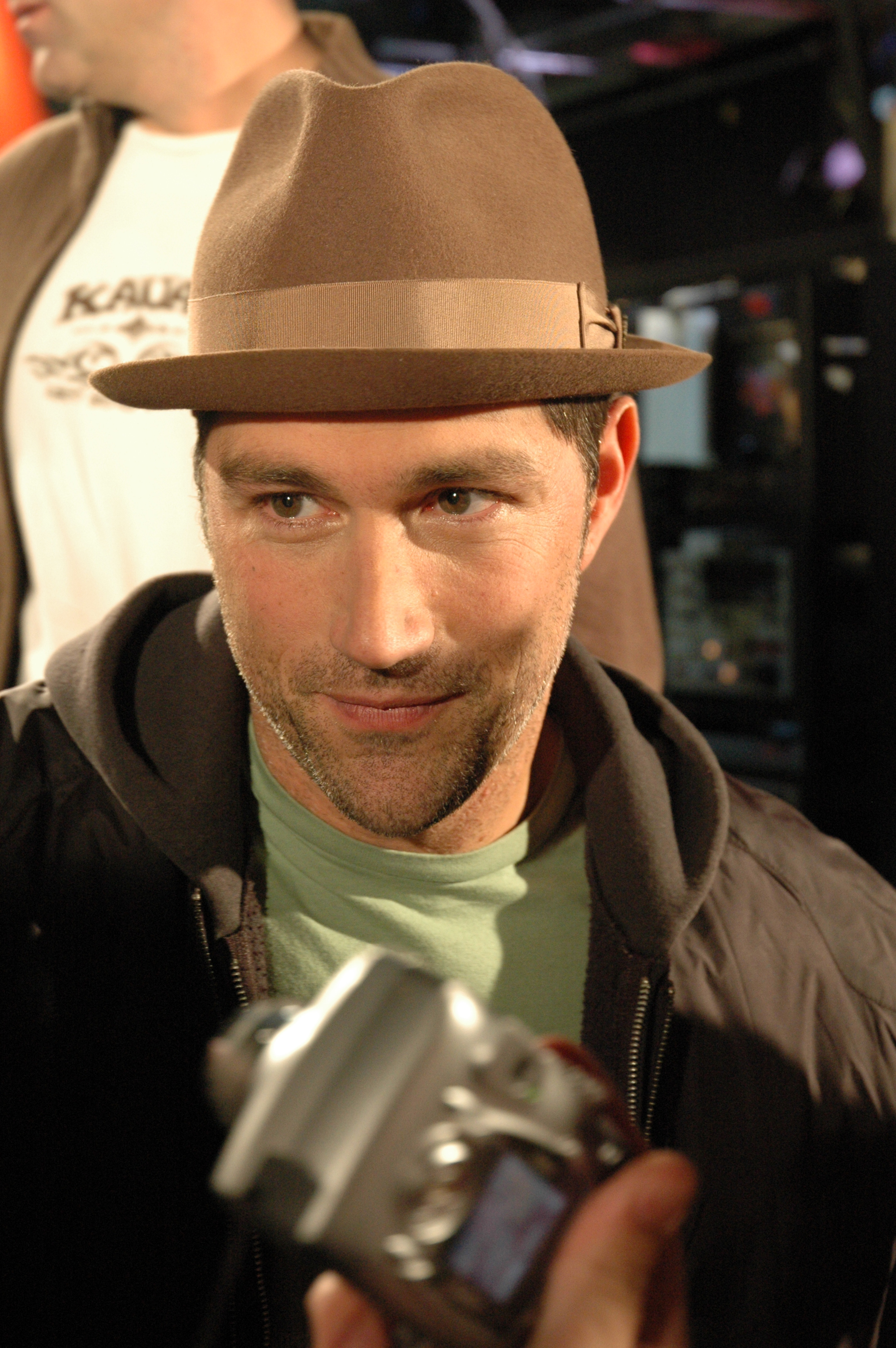
Fox outside of Citytv in Toronto during an open autograph session, December 6, 2006

At the age of 25, Fox made his debut on an episode of Wings. That same year, he also starred on a short-lived dramatic series, Freshman Dorm. Still not a familiar face on the small screen, he continued to be cast in supporting roles, including the role of Charlie in the CBS Schoolbreak Special series If I Die Before I Wake, before he made his big-screen debut in My Boyfriend's Back (1993).

In 1994, Fox was cast in a starring role as Charlie Salinger, the eldest of five siblings who lose both parents in a car accident on the 1994–2000 teen drama Party of Five, co-starring with Scott Wolf, Neve Campbell, Jennifer Love Hewitt, and Lacey Chabert. In 1996, People Magazine named Fox one of the 50 Most Beautiful People in the World. In 1999, he co-starred with Donald Sutherland in the true story-based film Behind the Mask (1999). After Party of Five was canceled following its sixth season, Fox starred in another TV series, Haunted, in 2002.

From September 2004 until May 2010, Fox played the role of the dedicated yet troubled surgeon, Dr. Jack Shephard, on Lost. He initially auditioned for the role of James "Sawyer" Ford. However, co-creator J. J. Abrams thought he would be better for the role of Jack, a role originally slated to be for the pilot episode only. Fox was nominated for a Golden Globe in the category "Best Actor – Television Series Drama", won the 2005 Satellite Award, and shared the 2006 Screen Actors Guild Award for "Outstanding Performance by an Ensemble in a Drama Series", for his role in Lost.

On December 2, 2006, Fox hosted Saturday Night Live with musical guests Tenacious D. In 2006, he co-starred with Matthew McConaughey in the sports drama We Are Marshall. He also played a bit part in the action film Smokin' Aces (along with Lost's co-star Néstor Carbonell and future cast member Kevin Durand) and starred in the 2008 thriller Vantage Point. In May 2008, Fox starred as Racer X in the movie Speed Racer.

Fox has repeatedly stated that he is "done with television" after Lost.

In 2011, he starred in the stage play In a Forest, Dark and Deep with Olivia Williams in London's West End.

Fox co-starred in Alex Cross (2012), as the villain, Michael "The Butcher" Sullivan, nicknamed "Picasso". For the role, Fox developed an extremely muscular physique and shed most of his body fat. The film was a critical and commercial failure but Fox was praised for his transformation and credibility in a vastly different role from Lost's Jack Shephard.

He appeared very briefly in the 2013 film World War Z which starred Brad Pitt.

He starred in the film Extinction that was released in July 2015. Directed by Miguel Ángel Vivas, the film is an adaptation of Juan de Dios Garduño's bestselling novel, Y pese a todo.

That same year, Fox also co-starred in the critically acclaimed American horror Western Bone Tomahawk. He had always wanted to act in a Western.

From 2014 to 2021, Fox took a break from acting to spend time with his family.

In 2021, Fox was cast in the lead role of a limited series Last Light, which was released on Peacock.

== Personal life ==
In 1992, Fox married his long-time girlfriend, Margherita Ronchi, a native of Italy. The couple met while Fox was a student at Columbia. The couple has two children. Fox is also a photographer. A bonus disc released with The Complete First Series of Lost features "The Art of Matthew Fox", showing pictures he took of the cast and crew while on set.

Fox has a passion for flying airplanes, and owns a Bonanza G36. "To be up there by yourself, and it's all up to you whether it's gonna be an amazing flight or it's not gonna go as beautiful[ly]. I feel like I'm hyper-prepared when I fly. There is so much you don't have control over."

=== Legal issues and allegations of abuse ===
On August 28, 2011, Fox was arrested for an alleged assault of a female bus driver in Cleveland, Ohio. Prosecutors decided not to charge Fox. In May 2012, the bus driver withdrew a civil suit after her lawyer departed and revealed that she "intentionally failed and refused to provide full and timely cooperation and information". In October 2012, Fox appeared on The Ellen DeGeneres Show and rebutted the accusations. He stated that he was punched in the face by a man and retaliated and that the bus driver tried to extort him.

In May 2012, his Lost co-star Dominic Monaghan tweeted about Fox, "He beats women. Not isolated incidents. Often." Fox called Monaghan's claims "a pile of bullshit" and said he was not going to "waste too much breath on that." He also told Men's Journal in 2012 that he has "never hit a woman before. Never have, never will."

That same year, Fox was arrested for driving under the influence.

== Filmography ==
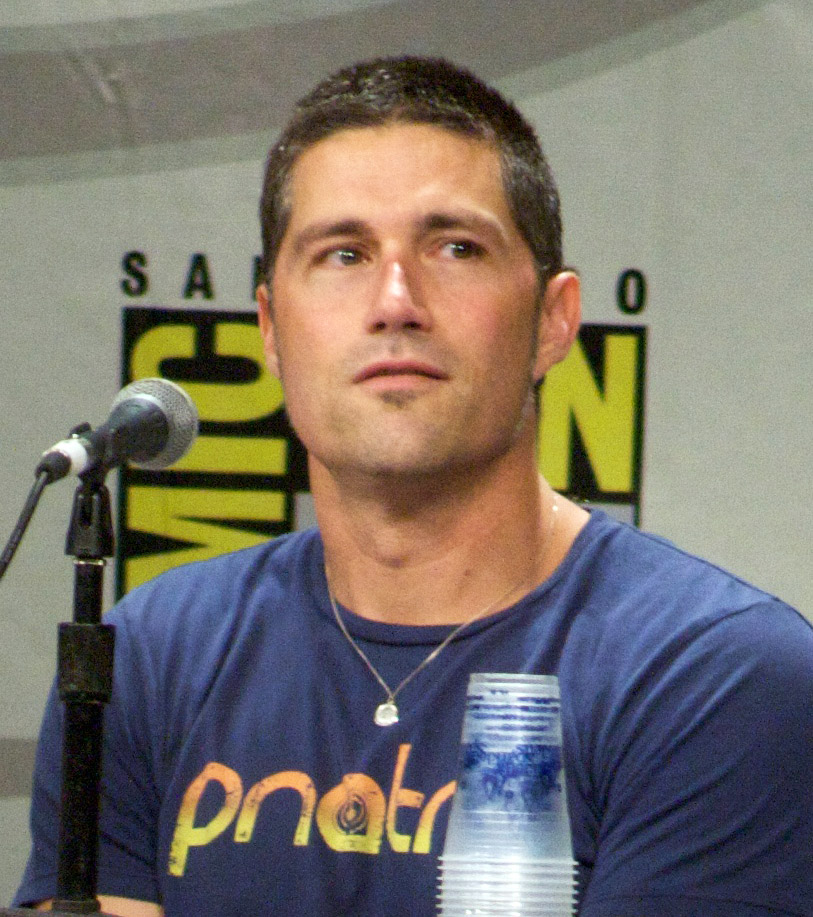
Fox at the 2008 San Diego Comic-Con

=== Film ===
Year	Title	Role	Notes
1993	My Boyfriend's Back	Buck Van Patten	
1995	Wishful Thinking	Max	1995 Sundance June Filmaker´s Lab
2006	Smokin' Aces	Bill Security Super	
2006	We Are Marshall	William "Red" Dawson	
2008	Vantage Point	Secret Service Agent Kent Taylor	
2008	Speed Racer	Rex Racer / Racer X	
2012	Alex Cross	"The Butcher of Sligo" / "Picasso"	
2012	Emperor	Bonner Fellers	
2013	World War Z	USAF Parajumper	
2015	Extinction	Patrick	
2015	Bone Tomahawk	John Brooder	

=== Television ===
Year	Title	Role	Notes
1992	Wings	Ty Warner	Episode: "Say It Ain't So, Joe"
1992	Freshman Dorm	Danny Foley	5 episodes
1993	CBS Schoolbreak Special	Charlie Deevers	Episode: "If I Die Before I Wake"
1994–2000	Party of Five	Charlie Salinger	142 episodes; also director in episode "Taboo or Not Taboo"
1995	MADtv	Charlie Salinger	Episode: "1.6"
1999	Behind the Mask	James Jones	Television movie
2002	Haunted	Frank Taylor	11 episodes
2004–2010	Lost	Jack Shephard	Main role; 113 episodes
2006	Saturday Night Live	Himself (host)	Episode: "Matthew Fox/Tenacious D"
2007–2008	Lost: Missing Pieces	Jack Shephard	4 episodes
2022	Last Light	Andy Yeats	5 episodes; also executive producer
2023	Caught	Pete Mitchell	6 episodes
2026	The Madison	Paul Clyburn	6 episodes

=== Video games ===
Year	Title	Voice role
2008	Speed Racer: The Videogame	Racer X

== Awards and nominations ==
Year	Award	Award category	Title of work	Result
2005	Satellite Awards	Satellite Award for Best Actor in a Television Drama Series	Lost	Won
2005	Academy of Science Fiction, Fantasy & Horror Films	Best Actor on Television	Lost	Nominated
2005	Peoples Choice Awards	Favorite Male Television Star	Lost	Nominated
2005	Teen Choice Awards	Choice TV Actor: Drama	Lost	Nominated
2005	Teen Choice Awards	Choice TV: Chemistry (shared with Evangeline Lilly)	Lost	Nominated
2005	Television Critics Association Awards	Individual Achievement in Drama	Lost	Nominated
2006	Academy of Science Fiction, Fantasy & Horror Films	Best Actor on Television	Lost	Won
2006	National Television Awards	Most Popular Actor	Lost	Nominated
2006	Saturn Awards	Best Lead Actor in a Television Series	Lost	Won
2006	Golden Globe Awards	Best Lead Actor in a Drama	Lost	Nominated
2006	Screen Actors Guild Awards	Screen Actors Guild Award for Outstanding Performance by an Ensemble Cast in a Drama Series	Lost	Won
2006	Teen Choice Awards	Choice TV Actor: Action/Drama	Lost	Nominated
2006	Teen Choice Awards	Choice TV Chemistry (shared with Josh Holloway and Evangeline Lilly)	Lost	Nominated
2007	Saturn Awards	Best Lead Actor in a Television Series	Lost	Nominated
2007	Teen Choice Awards	Choice TV Actor: Drama	Lost	Nominated
2008	Saturn Awards	Saturn Award for Best Actor on Television	Lost	Won
2008	Academy of Science Fiction, Fantasy & Horror Films	Best Actor on Television	Lost	Won
2008	Prism Awards	Performance in a Drama Series Episode	Lost	Nominated
2008	Teen Choice Awards	Choice TV Actor: Action	Lost	Nominated
2009	Saturn Awards	Best Lead Actor in a Television Series	Lost	Nominated
2009	Teen Choice Awards	Choice TV Actor: Action	Lost	Nominated
2009	People's Choice Awards	Favorite TV Actor – Drama	Lost	Nominated
2010	Saturn Awards	Best Lead Actor in a Television Series	Lost	Nominated
2010	Emmy Awards	Outstanding Lead Actor in a Drama Series	Lost	Nominated
2010	Scream Awards	Outstanding Television Performance	Lost	Won
2010	Scream Awards	Outstanding Ensemble Cast	Lost	Nominated
2010	Scream Awards	Outstanding Science Fiction Actor	Lost	Nominated
