= Skeeter Shelton =

American baseball player (1888–1954)

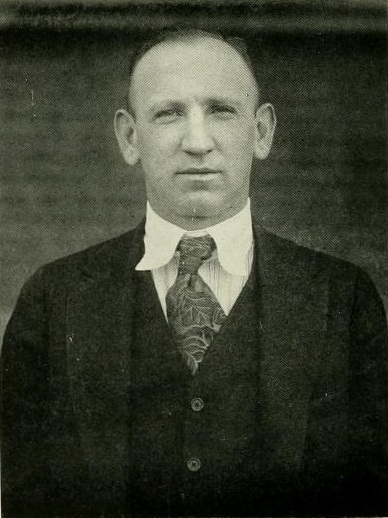
- Outfielder
- Born: June 29, 1888; Huntington, West Virginia, U.S.
- Died: January 9, 1954 (aged 65); Huntington, West Virginia, U.S.
- Batted: Right Threw: Right

MLB debut
- August 25, 1915, for the New York Yankees

Last MLB appearance
- September 1, 1915, for the New York Yankees

MLB statistics
- Batting average: .025
- Home runs: 0
- Runs batted in: 0
- Stats at Baseball Reference

Teams
- New York Yankees (1915)

Andrew Kemper "Skeeter" Shelton (June 29, 1888 – January 9, 1954) was an American Major League Baseball outfielder. He was born and died in Huntington, West Virginia.

Shelton played for the New York Yankees in the 1915 season, appearing in 10 consecutive games over an eight-day period from August 25 to September 1. In his ten career games, he had one hit in 40 at-bats for a .025 batting average. At center field, he was perfect, handling 22 total chances (20 putouts, 2 assists).

He batted and threw right-handed. Shelton was the baseball coach at West Virginia University from 1918 to 1920 and at Marshall University from 1922 to 1923.

Shelton committed suicide on January 9, 1954 at his home in Huntington after being depressed about heart issues.

== Head coaching record ==
=== Football ===
Year	Team	Overall	Conference	Standing	Bowl/playoffs
Marshall Thundering Herd (Independent) (1921–1922)
1921	Marshall	5–2–1			
1922	Marshall	5–4			
Marshall:		10–6–1			
Total:		10–6–1			
