= Jack Lengyel =

American football coach, lacrosse coach, and college athletics administrator

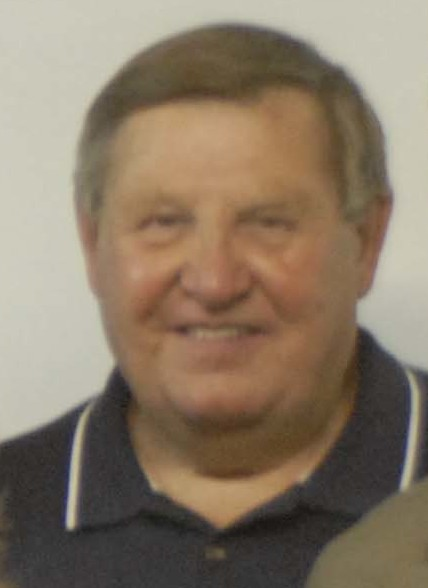
- Lengyel in 2008

Biographical details
- Born: March 4, 1935 (age 91); Akron, Ohio, U.S.

Coaching career (HC unless noted)

Football
- 1959: Akron (assistant)
- 1961–1962: Heidelberg (assistant)
- 1963–1965: Cornell (assistant)
- 1966–1970: Wooster
- 1971–1974: Marshall

Baseball
- 1961–1963: Heidelberg

Lacrosse
- 1968–1970: Wooster

Administrative career (AD unless noted)
- 1978–1980: Louisville (associate/acting AD)
- 1980–1983: Missouri (associate AD)
- 1983–1986: Fresno State
- 1986–1988: Missouri
- 1988–2001: Navy
- 2002: Temple (interim AD)
- 2002–2003: Eastern Kentucky (interim AD)
- 2004–2005: Colorado (interim AD)

Head coaching record
- Overall: 33–54 (football); 26–22 (baseball); 10–11 (lacrosse)

Jack Robert Lengyel (born March 4, 1935) is an American software executive and former college football coach, college lacrosse coach, and athletics administrator. He served as the head football coach at the College of Wooster from 1966 to 1970 and at Marshall University from 1971 until 1974, compiling a career college football record of 33–54. At Marshall, he took over the Thundering Herd football program after the Southern Airways Flight 932 plane crash that killed nearly the entire team in 1970. Lengyel was the athletic director at California State University, Fresno from 1983 to 1986, at the University of Missouri from 1986 to 1988, and at the United States Naval Academy from 1988 to 2001. He served as the interim athletic director at Temple University in 2002, at Eastern Kentucky University from 2002 to 2003, and at the University of Colorado Boulder from 2004 to 2005.

== Early life and coaching career ==
Lengyel's family name means 'from Poland' in Hungarian. He graduated from The University of Akron where he was an assistant coach in 1959, and was a member of the Lone Star Fraternity (Pi Kappa Epsilon). In 1962, he earned a Master of Education degree from Kent State University. He was an assistant coach at Heidelberg College (1961–1962) and Cornell University (1963–1965) before becoming head football coach at the College of Wooster in 1966. At Wooster, Lengyel transformed a team that was 0–9 to winning consecutive games. He also coached lacrosse at Wooster for three seasons, from 1968 to 1970.

=== Marshall ===
Lengyel was hired by athletic director Joe McMullen after head coach Rick Tolley was killed along with 37 players and 38 other coaches, university administrators, school boosters, and flight crew members in a plane crash on November 14, 1970. He was selected for the job after it was rejected by a Penn State assistant and an assistant from Georgia Tech turned it down. When Lengyel arrived at Marshall he was forced to recruit athletes from other sports (baseball and basketball) as well as allow a large number of walk-ons in order to rebuild the devastated football program. Although the team struggled in Lengyel's first season at the helm, it managed to defeat Xavier 15–13, scoring a touchdown on the final play of the game. His overall record at Marshall as the head coach was 9–33.

== Administrative career ==
After leaving Marshall, Lengyel went into the private sector before returning to sports as associate director of athletics at the University of Louisville from 1978 to 1980 and the University of Missouri from 1980 to 1983. He then went to California State University, Fresno as director of athletics from 1983 to 1986. He returned to University of Missouri to become their athletic director from 1986 to 1988.

In 1988, he became the athletic director at the United States Naval Academy, where he served for 14 years before retiring in 2001. He received the 2005 John L. Toner Award from the National Football Foundation and College Football Hall of Fame for his service at Navy. Since retiring from Navy in 2001, he has also been the interim director of athletics at Temple University, Eastern Kentucky University, and most recently University of Colorado.

Lengyel also served many years on the board of trustees for the Foundation of the United States Naval Academy. He is currently the vice president of business development for XOS Digital, a sports media and technology company.

On January 12, 2008, seven members of a high school basketball team from Bathurst, New Brunswick, Canada and their coach's wife were killed in a highway crash when the 15-seat van they were traveling in collided with a tractor-trailer while returning from a game in Moncton in snowy conditions. Drawing similarities between the two tragedies, on March 13, 2008, Jack Lengyel funded his own traveling expenses to New Brunswick, Canada to assist in counseling the grieving community.

Lengyel went on record with the Canadian Press stating that schools should not be transporting students in small, multi-passenger vans. The New Brunswick government announced soon after the crash that it was suspending the use of the vans.

In 2019, Lengyel was named to the National Football Foundation (NFF) & College Hall of Fame's 150th Anniversary Team of Excellence.

== In media ==
In the 2006 film We Are Marshall, based on the Marshall plane crash and Marshall's 1971 team, Lengyel was portrayed by Matthew McConaughey.

== Head coaching record ==
=== Football ===
| Year | Team | Overall | Conference | Standing | Bowl/playoffs |
|---|---|---|---|---|---|
Wooster Fighting Scots (Ohio Athletic Conference) (1966–1970)
| 1966 | Wooster | 1–8 | 1–5 | 12th | |
| 1967 | Wooster | 6–3 | 5–1 | T–2nd | |
| 1968 | Wooster | 6–3 | 5–2 | T–4th | |
| 1969 | Wooster | 3–6 | 3–4 | T–9th | |
| 1970 | Wooster | 7–2 | 5–1 | T–3rd | |
| Wooster: | | 24–21 | 19–13 | | |
Marshall Thundering Herd (NCAA University Division / Division I independent) (1971–1974)
| 1971 | Marshall | 2–8 | | | |
| 1972 | Marshall | 2–8 | | | |
| 1973 | Marshall | 4–7 | | | |
| 1974 | Marshall | 1–10 | | | |
| Marshall: | | 9–33 | | | |
| Total: | | 33–54 | | | |

=== Men's lacrosse ===
Record table
| Season | Team | Overall | Conference | Standing | Postseason |
|---|---|---|---|---|---|
Wooster Fighting Scots () (1967–1969)
| 1967 | Wooster | 7–1 | | | |
| 1968 | Wooster | 1–5 | | | |
| 1969 | Wooster | 2–5 | | | |
| Wooster: | | 10–11 (.476) | 10–11 (.476) | | |
| Total: | | 10–11 (.476) | | | |

== See also ==
- List of teachers portrayed in films
