= List of mayors of Huntington, West Virginia =

Mayor of Huntington, West Virginia
- Incumbent; Patrick Farrell since 2025
- Formation: 1871
- First holder: Peter Cline Buffington (1871 - 1874)
- Website: Mayor's Office

This is a list of mayors of Huntington, West Virginia, United States of America.

== History ==
Since 1985 Huntington, West Virginia has operated under a strong mayor/city council form of government. The mayor is elected to four-year terms in partisan elections contested at the same time as United States presidential elections. The current mayor is Patrick Farrell, a Republican who is currently in his first term. Mayors in Huntington are term-limited to three terms and have the authority to veto acts of the city council.

== Mayors ==
=== Pre strong mayor format ===
Order	Mayor	Term Began	Term Ended	Notes
1	Peter Cline Buffington	1871	1874	First mayor of Huntington, West Virginia
2	Thomas J. Burke	1874	1876	
3	M. G. Nichols	1876	1877	
4	Thomas J. Burke	1877	1878	
5	J. M. Layne	1878	1879	
6	Edward S. Buffington	1879	1880	Son of Peter Cline Buffington
7	George Cullen	1880	1882	
8	J. M. Layne	1882	1883	
9	Hamilton Dickey	1883	1884	
10	A. L. Crider	1884	1885	
11	E. A. Bennett	1885	1886	
12	A. H. Woodworth	1886	1887	
13	Thomas S. Garland	1887	1889	
14	Thomas S. Garland	1890	1891	
15	Hamilton Dickey	1891	1892	
16	W. H. Bull	1892	1893	
17	George I. Neal	1893	1895	
18	C. R. Enlow	1895	1896	
19	Ely Ensign	1896	1896	
20	William F. Hite	1897	1898	
21	Charles A. Nash	1898	1899	
22	H. A. Brandebury	1899	1901	
23	H. C. Gordon	1901	1903	
24	Charles M. Buck	1903	1905	
25	H. C. Gordon	1905	1906	
26	John W. Ensign	1906	1908	
27	John B. Stevenson	1908	1909	
28	Rufus Switzer	1909	1912	
29	Floyd S. Chapman	1912	1915	
30	Edmund Sehon	1915	1918	
31	Leon S. Wiles	1918	1918	Died in office
32	Charles W. Campbell	1919	1922	
33	Will E. Neal	1925	1928	
34	J. Boyce Taylor	1928	1929	
35	Porter W. Smith	1930	1934	
36	Martin V. Chapman	1935	1935	
37	George R. Seamonds	1937	1939	
38	Claude V. Swann	1940	1942	
39	Paul O. Fiedler	1943	1946	
40	Douglas C. Tomkies	1947	1948	
41	W. W. Payne	1949	1952	
42	Cecil C. Thompson	1953	1954	
43	George E. Theurer	1955	1955	
44	Harold L. Frankel	1957	1959	
45	Robert O. Ellis, Jr.	1959	1959	
46	John J. Durkin	1961	1961	
47	George Garner	1962	1963	
48	A. E. Harris	1964	1964	
49	John B. Meek	1965	1965	
50	R. O. Robertson, Jr.	1966	1966	
51	Owen L. Duncan	1967	1967	
52	Gordon Miller	1968	1968	
53	Robert V. Bolling	1969	1969	
54	Robert E. Hinerman	1970	1970	
55	Milton T. Herndon	1971	1971	
56	Gordon T. Millard	1972	1972	
57	Owen L. Duncan	1973	1973	
58	Phyllis Cyrus	1973	1974	
59	Harold L. Frankel	1974	1975	
60	J. A. Caldwell	1975	1976	
61	Harold L. Frankel	1977	1978	
62	George Malott	1978	1978	
63	Dean Sturm	1979	1980	
64	William D. Toney	1981	1981	
65	Robert P. Alexander	1982	1983	

=== Strong mayor format ===
Order	Mayor	Term Began	Term Ended	Notes
66	Bobby Nelson	1985	1993	First mayor in Strong mayor format
67	Jean Dean	1993	2000	First woman mayor
68	David Felinton	2001	2008	
69	Kim Wolfe	2009	2012	
70	Stephen T. Williams	2013	2025	First three-term mayor
71	Patrick Farrell	2025	Present	

== See also ==
- Huntington, West Virginia
