= Peter Cline Buffington =

First mayor of Huntington, West Virginia

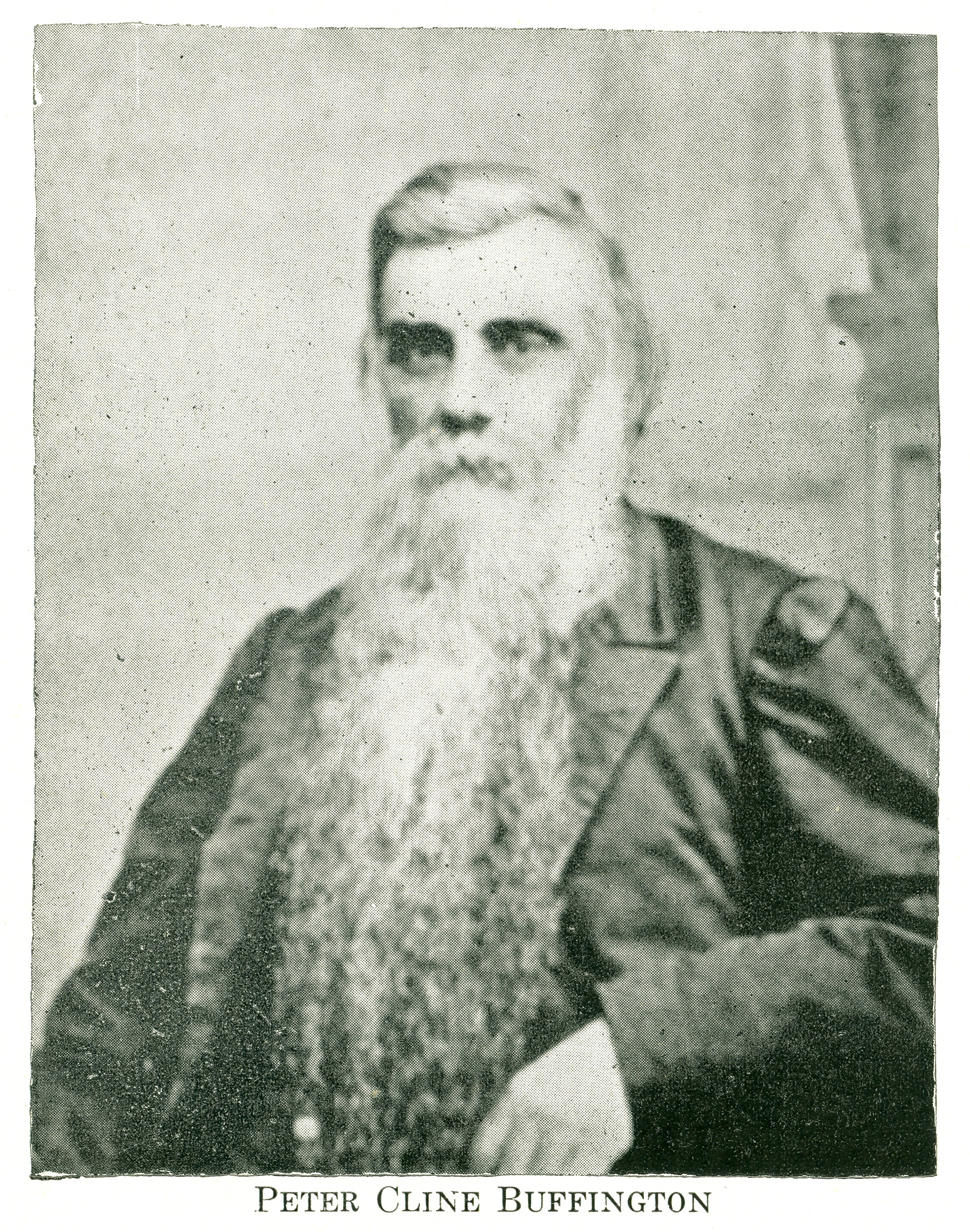

Mayor of Huntington
- In office 1871–1874
- Succeeded by: Albert H. Woodworth

Personal details
- Born: September 22, 1814; Guyandotte, West Virginia, US
- Died: April 18, 1875 (aged 60); Huntington, West Virginia, US
- Spouse(s): Eliza Jane Stanard Buffington; Louisa I. Garland Buffington

Peter Cline Buffington was the first mayor of Huntington, West Virginia.

== Career ==
Before becoming mayor, Buffington was the first president of the first bank in Huntington, West Virginia, The Bank of Huntington.

On December 31st, 1871, an election was held where Buffington was elected the first mayor of Huntington. After being elected, Buffington pushed for an election of a marshal and the recruitment of a police force, this group was later authorized to appoint a special police force to handle a large crowd that was attending a circus in the city.

== Personal life ==
Buffington had five children with his two spouses: Willie Ann and Edward with Eliza Jane; Garland, Peter Jr., and Juliette with Louisa.

== Namesakes ==
Buffington Elementary School, built in 1872, was named after Peter Cline Buffington and his family. The building was demolished in 1996 after John W. Clark Oil Co. purchased it for future commercial construction.

== See also ==
- List of mayors of Huntington, West Virginia
