= Ferrum College =

Private college in Ferrum, Virginia, US

- Former names: Ferrum Training School (1913–1940); Ferrum Training School – Ferrum Junior College (1940–1948); Ferrum Junior College (1948–1971)
- Motto: Latin: Non sibi sed aliis
- Motto in English: Not Self, But Others
- Type: Private college
- Established: 1913; 113 years ago
- Religious affiliation: United Methodist Church
- Endowment: $60 million (2024)
- President: Mirta Martin
- Faculty: 50
- Undergraduates: 760
- Location: Ferrum, Virginia, U.S. 36°55′35.6″N 80°1′26.9″W
- Campus: Rural, 700 acres (2.8 km^{2})
- Colors: Black and gold
- Nickname: Panthers
- Sporting affiliations: NCAA Division II – Conference Carolinas
- Mascot: Panther
- Website: ferrum.edu
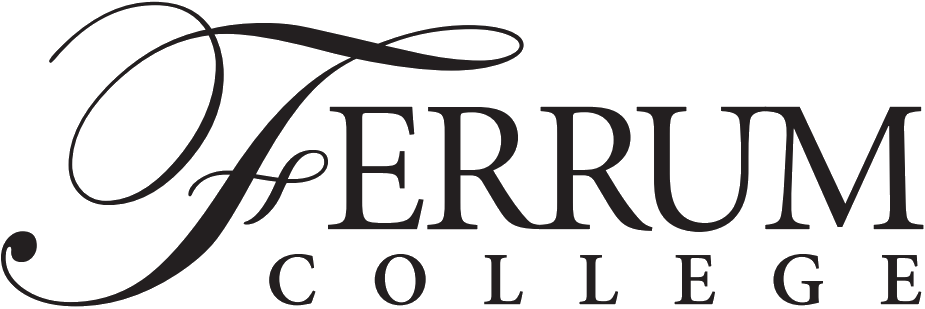

Ferrum College is a private college in Ferrum, Virginia. The college was established in 1913 as the "Ferrum Training School" (also referred to as the "Ferrum Institute" by its board of trustees) for primary and secondary education to serve the mountain communities of rural Southwest Virginia.

The school was known as "Ferrum Junior College" between 1940 and 1976. It was founded by the United Methodist Church and gradually developed from primary to post-secondary education. Today, Ferrum enrolls around 800 undergraduate and graduate students and offers over 54 undergraduate majors and four graduate programs. Ferrum College's 700-acre (280 ha) campus is in the foothills of the Blue Ridge Mountains near Rocky Mount, Virginia, in Franklin County.

Its athletic teams, known as the Panthers, compete in Division II of the NCAA in the Conference Carolinas. Ferrum has 11 men's teams and 14 women's teams. The football team is commonly referred to as the "Black Hats".

The Ferrum College campus is listed on the National Register of Historic Places and the Virginia Landmarks Register.

== History ==
=== Founding ===
Charitable members of the Methodist Episcopal Church in Virginia established the school—Ferrum Training School—in Ferrum, Virginia in 1913 to provide educational opportunities to underprivileged youth in the state's Blue Ridge Mountains region. The Virginia Conference Woman's Home Missionary Society (VCWHMS) under President Mrs. Lee Britt wished to serve and educate the rural population of southwestern Virginia. Already in 1909, President Britt informed Benjamin Beckham, presiding elder of the Danville district, that the VCWHMS had gathered $1,200 toward constructing a school somewhere in the district. In 1911, the village of Ferrum was selected as the location of the train depot on the Norfolk and Western Railway between Roanoke and Winston-Salem. In 1912, Beckham offered to help raise $25,000, and in 1913, the society formed a board of trustees and purchased 80 acres of land for the campus from local farmer George Goode, with another 50 acres donated by citizens of the village, allowing the board to officially establish Ferrum Training School.

Construction began in earnest in 1914 and Beckham moved his family to the site, opening the first section of John Wesley Hall to begin the first term of instruction in the fall of 1914. The small school grew with the support of the railway, which constructed a cinder road from the Ferrum Depot to Ferrum Training School. The board of trustees purchased an additional 96 acres in 1916, and Ferrum graduated their first diploma-earning student in 1917: Berta Thompson (1897–1975), who went on to become a public-school teacher.

After steady growth in its first decade, despite numerous crises involving sickness, financial difficulties, and luring faculty to rural Virginia, in 1926 Ferrum's trustees voted to recast the institution as a junior college. In 1928, the village of Ferrum opened a public elementary school. Between 1926 and 1935, Ferrum Training School transitioned into secondary education with the occasional postsecondary course in religious training. After 1935, Ferrum Training School under President James A. Chapman began seeking accreditation, the name of the institution in 1940 becoming "Ferrum Training School – Ferrum Junior College".

=== From crisis to growth ===
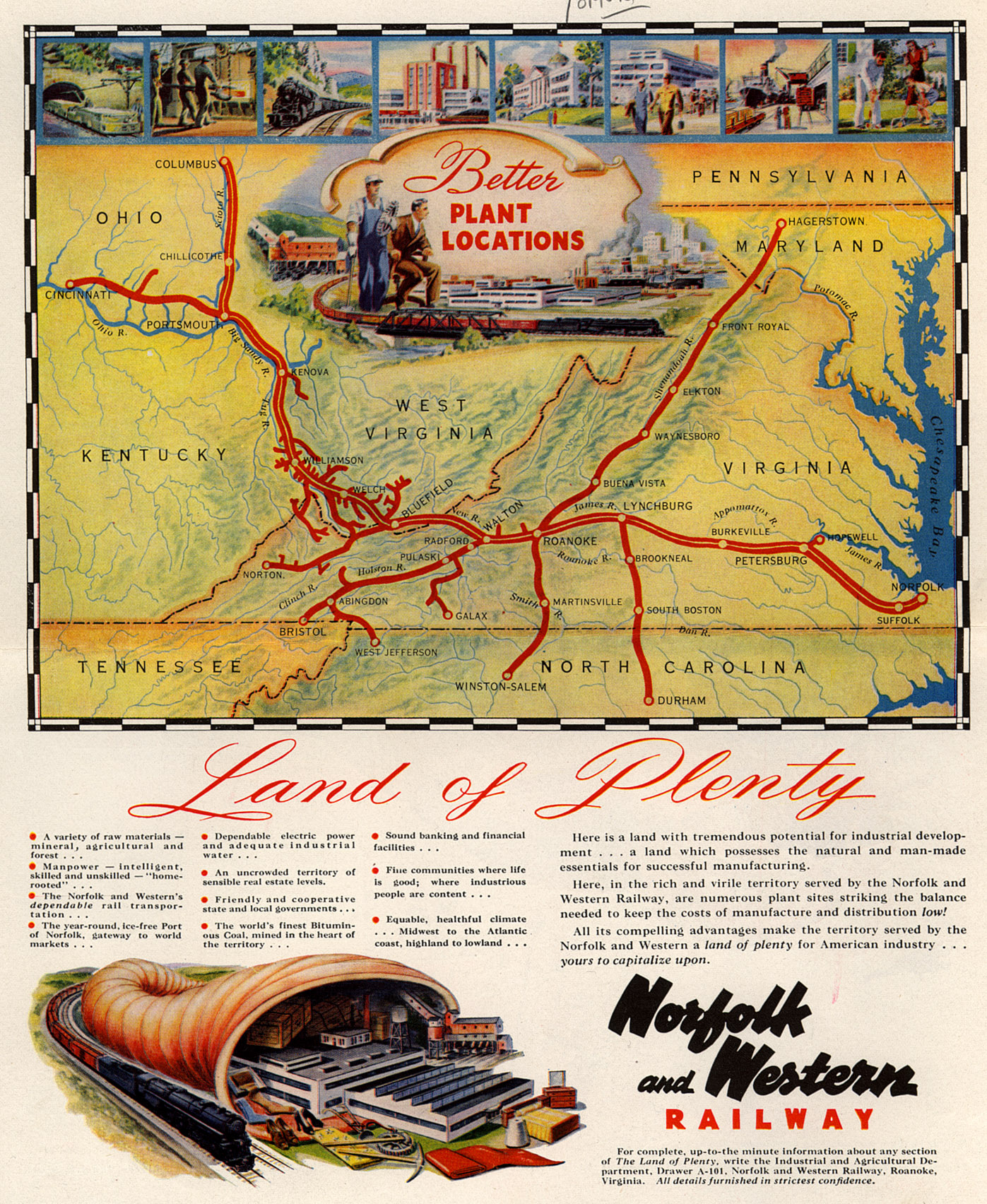
Norfolk and Western magazine ad with system map, 1948: Ferrum lies between Roanoke and Martinsville.

By 1940, half of the enrolled students were college level; the elementary division closed before the end of World War II. With the closing of the original training school's primary school, some thought that the mountain mission school had served its purpose. In a 1948 editorial for the Richmond Christian Advocate, its editor, George Reamey, recommended the school be closed. The resignation of the fourth president, Derby in 1948, came in part from similar concerns about the viability of the school in postwar Virginia. However, this crisis inspired a wide outpouring of support from alumni and a decision to make stronger appeals and more competitive salaries to entice faculty and staff to the college's rural location. At the same time, the school's name was shortened to just "Ferrum Junior College".

Ferrum was located in an extremely rural area. The nearest city was miles away and the isolation was not welcomed by many. Derby recommended that salaries be raised and living conditions be improved as soon as possible to help in recruiting teachers and students.

— Carolyn Pilla Nolen, The History of Ferrum College, 1996

President Derby's successor was fittingly one of the many alumni who championed a future for Ferrum Training School, Nathaniel Davis of the class of 1924. Under his leadership, the school continued its transition into a junior college and instituted an annual hike for the students in the surrounding mountains. By the 1950s, the junior college transformation was complete, with the high school division closing in 1955.

=== Ferrum Junior College ===
With the arrival of the new President C. Ralph Arthur in 1954, a new era on campus began. President Arthur pressed the Methodist Church for stronger financial support, oversaw the removal of undercredentialed and ill-trained faculty, and the hiring of professional collegiate-level educators to be enticed by school-provided housing that President Arthur convinced the board of trustees to build. President Arthur was a tireless fundraiser from local businesses, government officials at every level, and throughout the branches of the Methodist Church. The changes at the school led to unprecedented growth in the student population; from only 238 students in 1958 to 646 in 1962. By the 50th Anniversary celebrated in the 1963–1964 academic year, the school had 799 students and 50 full-time faculty. Another shift was the rise in collegiate athletics, exemplified by the long career of Hank Norton, who began coaching in 1960 and continued his association with the college for over three decades.

As early as 1963, the Methodist Church Annual Conference had recommended that its schools in Virginia consider enrollment of all students without regard to race. Beginning in 1966, Ferrum welcomed its first four African-American students: Alice Baker as the school's first, followed over the next year by Fred Dunnings of Rocky Mount, Jerry Venable from Staunton - the school's first black student athlete - and Allen White from Philadelphia.

Founded by members of the Methodist Episcopal Church, Ferrum College saw changes at the board of trustees level with the merging of various Methodist branches in 1939 (healing the split in 1844 over the differences between north and south on the criminality of slavery) and again in 1968 to form the United Methodist Church.

In 1970, Arthur succumbed after a long battle with cancer. His funeral was held in the newly opened Vaughn Chapel; classes were suspended, but with all students on campus to pay their respects to the man who had utterly transformed the campus from a mountain primary school to a prestigious junior college. Arthur was interred in a vault beneath the chapel bell tower.

=== Ferrum College ===
Presidents of Ferrum
President	From	To
Benjamin M. Beckham	1913	1934
John A. Carter	1934	1935
James A. Chapman	1935	1943
Luther J. Derby	1943	1948
Nathaniel H. Davis '24	1948	1952
Stanley E. Emrich	1952	1954
C. Ralph Arthur	1954	1970
Joseph T. Hart	1971	1986
Jerry M. Boone	1987	2002
Jennifer L. Braaten	2002	2016
Joseph "Jody" Carson Spooner	2016	2017
David L. Johns	2018	2022
Mirta M. Martin	2022	present

With the passing of Arthur, the ambitions of the board of trustees turned them to Joseph Hart for the eighth president. A historian and political scientist by training, Hart began his tenure by explaining to the board of trustees that Ferrum would continue to grow in academics, but also as a cornerstone of the local community, likely a change brought about by Arthur's insistence that the faculty live within the bounds of the town.

In our assessment of where to go from there, it was fairly obvious that we needed to put renewed emphasis on the quality of the whole program, not just academics but student activities as well... we gradually paid off everything except a long-term note that goes until 2010. We gradually built up enrollment to 1600 which helped us pay to pay off the debt, after which we cut back enrollment by 100 students a year to remain competitive until we hit 1200... We saw very soon that we could not develop the college from an academic standpoint separate from the community. The Blue Ridge Institute highlighted the heritage and people of our community. Many people came to the Folk Life Festivals who had never been on the Ferrum Campus before.

— President John Hart, interview with Carolyn Pilla Nolen, 1995

Many of the junior colleges of the 1950s and 1960s began to transition either into the new community college model or otherwise to transform into four-year colleges; Ferrum Junior College was in an increasingly untenable position. In response, the school moved to attract more faculty and programs, until in 1976, Ferrum received accreditation from the Southern Association of Colleges and Schools to operate as a four-year college, five years after it adopted its current name.

In 2020, this historic trend continued when Ferrum College received similar accreditation to confer graduate degrees.

Today, Ferrum College offers bachelor's degrees in over 50 major degree programs and several graduate programs.

The college is affiliated with the Virginia Annual Conference of the United Methodist Church and the United Methodist Women of the Virginia Annual Conference.

== Campus ==
- Ferrum College Historic District
- U.S. National Register of Historic Places
- Virginia Landmarks Register
- Location within Virginia Location within the United States
- Location: Ferrum College Campus, Ferrum, Virginia
- Area: 5 acres (2.0 ha)
- Built: Between 1914 and 1942
- Architect: Multiple
- Architectural style: Classical Revival, Colonial Revival, Craftsman
- NRHP reference No.: 13000889
- VLR No.: 033-0286

Significant dates
- Added to NRHP: October 29, 2013
- Designated VLR: September 19, 2013

The Ferrum campus is located on 700 acres (2.8 km^{2}) near the town of Ferrum, Virginia. The nearest large cities are Roanoke, Virginia (35 miles (56 km) northeast) and Greensboro, North Carolina (70 miles south).

=== Notable buildings ===
The Blue Ridge Institute and Museum, designated as the State Center for Blue Ridge Folklore by the Virginia General Assembly in 1986, is on the main campus near the Blue Ridge Farm Museum.

Since 1973, the institute has held the annual Blue Ridge Folklife Festival on the fourth Saturday in October to showcase regional traditions. In 1999, the museum's collection of Great Road pottery was featured on an episode of the American version of Antiques Roadshow.

The Titmus Agricultural Center has a modern barn where the students raise sheep, cattle, and horses. The farm also has a garden where students grow vegetables and herbs for the campus dining hall. In 2016, College Ranker ranked the Titmus Agricultural Center as number eight in the country for Best College Farms.

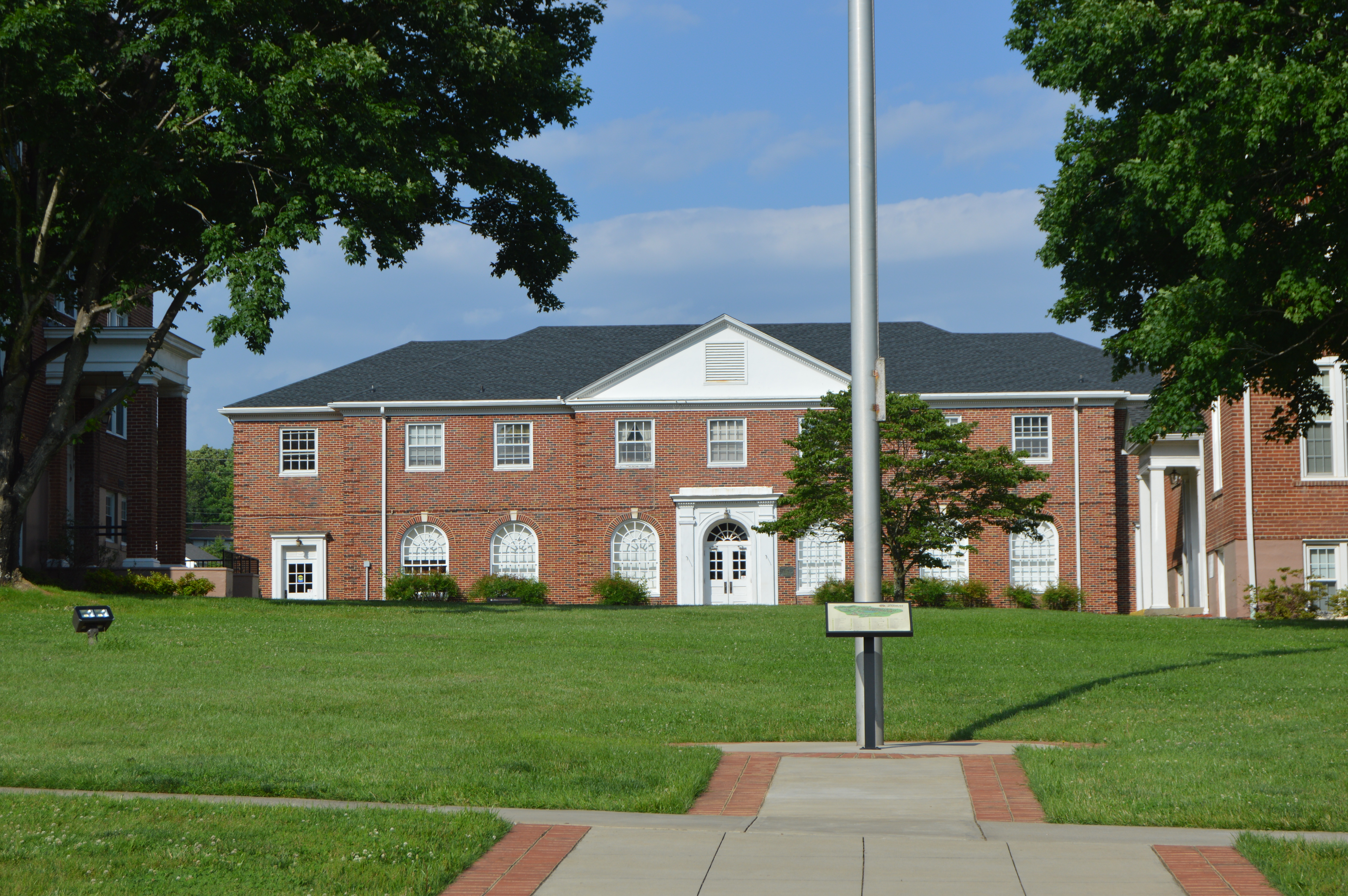
Britt Hall

Stanley Library, named after the 57th governor of Virginia, Thomas B. Stanley, is the three-storied library on campus. It serves not only as a library, but also contains many quiet areas for study, including an art gallery, the International Programs office, the Carter Center for Academic Success, and several classrooms.

The Hank Norton Center contains a sports-medicine facility, locker rooms for teams, offices, and a kitchen. It was built in 2012 and named in honor of former football coach and athletic director Hank Norton, who spent 34 years at Ferrum.

The Stratton House, Spilman-Daniel House, John Wesley Hall, Roberts Hall, Richeson Hall, and Beckham Hall are part of the Ferrum College Historic District and are listed in the Virginia Landmarks Register and the National Register of Historic Places.

== Academics ==
Ferrum College currently offers 54 undergraduate degree programs and two graduate degree programs (master of science in psychology, and Ed.S. in teacher leadership and coaching). In 2020, the college started offering degrees in nursing, and a 100% online RN-to-BSN program.

The college's environmental science program is the second-oldest in the country, and Ferrum is the only private college in Virginia to offer a bachelor's degree in agricultural science.

In partnership with the Association of International Educators, Ferrum offers the #YouAreWelcomeHere scholarship to promote international students seeking education in the United States. The college currently has students representing over 12 countries on its campus.

The Boone Honors is an interdisciplinary program committed to challenging students enrolled in the program. The honors program is for students enrolling with a combined math/verbal SAT score of 1200 or higher and a cumulative high school GPA of 3.5. Every student in the program is eligible to receive travel scholarship money for study abroad, and other extracurricular activities.

== Student life ==
Ferrum College has four sororities and three fraternities.

The Chrysalis Literary and Arts Magazine is a collection of works created by students and faculty. New issues are published each semester, and they display works of poetry, prose, photography, and visual art.

Spiritual life at Ferrum offers students a chance to grow their spirituality. Due to COVID-19, the previously weekly in-person offerings are now shown virtually over social media.

The Iron Blade, established in 1955, is the campus newspaper. The content is written primarily by students, and it delivers news to the Ferrum College campus and the broader Franklin community.

Norton Outdoors is the outdoor connection for students, faculty, and staff. Trips are frequently taken involving various outdoor activities such as sailing, skiing, rock climbing, hiking, and caving.

== Athletics ==
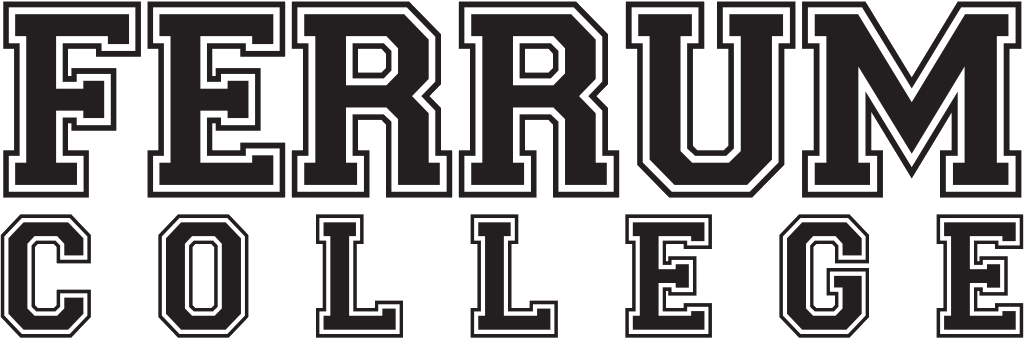
Ferrum Panthers wordmark

The Ferrum athletic teams are called the Panthers. The university is a member of the Division III of the National Collegiate Athletic Association (NCAA), primarily competing in the Old Dominion Athletic Conference (ODAC) since the 2018–19 academic year. The Panthers previously competed in the USA South Athletic Conference (USA South) for most of its sports from 1988–89 to 2017–18; while its football team competed in the Atlantic Central Football Conference (ACFC) from the 1998 to 2000 fall seasons (1998–99 to 2000–01 school years) before it later joined with the rest of their sports in the USA South; and as an NCAA D-III Independent from 1985–86 to 1987–88.

In 2025, Ferrum moved to NCAA Division II as a member of Conference Carolinas.

Ferrum competes in 25 intercollegiate varsity sports: Men's sports include baseball, basketball, cross country, football, golf, lacrosse, soccer, swimming, tennis, track and field, and wrestling; women's sports include basketball, cheerleading, cross country, equestrian, field hockey, golf, lacrosse, soccer, softball, swimming, tennis, track and field, volleyball, and wrestling.

=== History ===
Ferrum joined the NCAA Division III ranks in 1985 after being previously classified as a junior college. Under head coach W. H. "Hank" Norton, Ferrum won the National Junior College Athletic Association (NJCAA) national football championship four times (1965, 1968, 1974, 1977). Norton's last great team, in 1989, finished third overall in the NCAA Division III rankings. This team featured future AFC leading rusher Chris Warren and Freddie Stovall.

Seven members of the Panthers' 1968 championship team—all of whom had transferred to Marshall University—died in the 1970 plane crash that also claimed the lives of 37 Thundering Herd players and 30 others, including the team's coaches, 25 boosters, and the entire flight crew.

Ferrum was the first college in Virginia to offer collegiate women's wrestling. In March 2019, Ferrum College hosted the NCAA Division III men's wrestling championships, held at the Berglund Center in Roanoke, Virginia.

In January 2020, the college announced plans to launch both women's and men's track and field programs beginning in the fall 2020 season.

The spring 2020 athletics season was abruptly canceled in March of that year, due to the COVID-19 global pandemic.

== Notable alumni ==
- Watkins Abbitt, Jr., former member of the Virginia House of Delegates
- Jake Cabell, college football assistant coach
- Ed George, former NFL player
- Bruce Gossett, Former kicker, San Francisco 49ers
- Jim Grobe, former head football coach
- Kevin Keatts, former head men's basketball coach at North Carolina State University
- Jim Kitts, former NFL player
- Al Latimer, former NFL player
- Billy Joe Mantooth, former NFL player
- Eric Owens '93, baseball outfielder. Florida Marlins, San Diego Padres, Milwaukee Brewers, and Cincinnati Reds
- Larry Robinson, former NFL player
- Nick Rodriguez, former wrestler and current submission grappler
- John Paul Vann, Lt. Col. in the U.S. Army, the only civilian to receive the Distinguished Service Cross in the Vietnam War. Subject of Neil Sheehan's book, and the HBO series A Bright Shining Lie
- Billy Wagner, Hall of Fame baseball pitcher for the Atlanta Braves; Boston Red Sox, New York Mets, Philadelphia Phillies, and Houston Astros
- Chris Warren '90, football running back for the Seattle Seahawks, Dallas Cowboys, and Philadelphia Eagles
