= Ferrum, Virginia =

- CDP
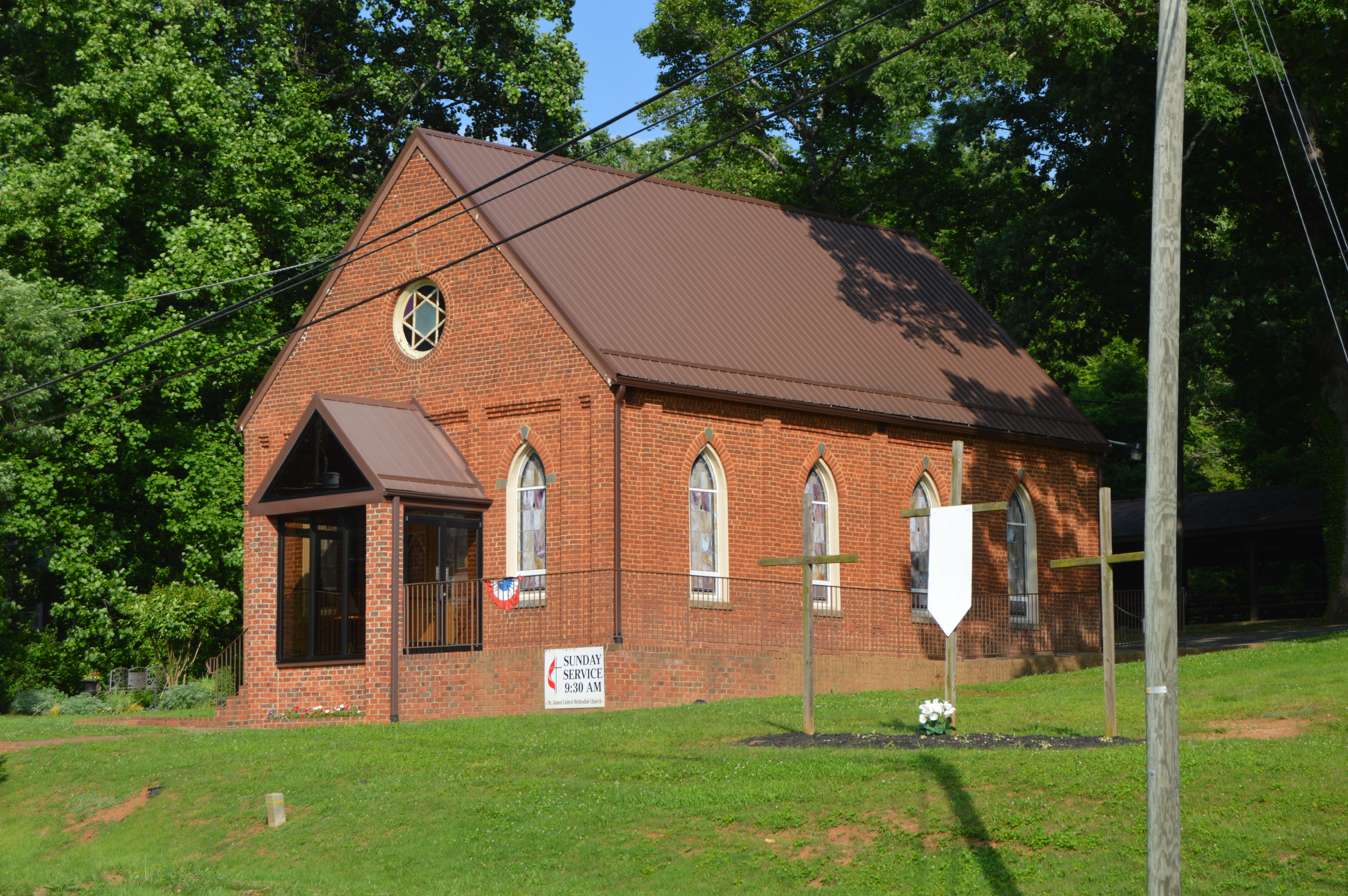
- Methodist church on Franklin Street

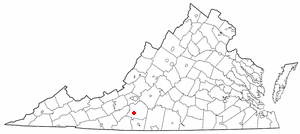
- Location of Ferrum, Virginia
- Coordinates: 36°55′35″N 80°0′40″W
- Country: United States
- State: Virginia
- County: Franklin

Area
  - Total: 9.3 sq mi (24.0 km^{2})
  - Land: 9.3 sq mi (24.0 km^{2})
  - Water: 0 sq mi (0.0 km^{2})
- Elevation: 1,296 ft (395 m)

Population (2010)
  - Total: 2,043
  - Density: 220/sq mi (85.1/km^{2})
- Time zone: UTC−5 (Eastern (EST))
  - Summer (DST): UTC−4 (EDT)
- ZIP code: 24088
- Area code: 540
- FIPS code: 51-27712
- GNIS feature ID: 1466533

Ferrum is a census-designated place (CDP) in Franklin County, Virginia, United States. As of the 2020 census, Ferrum had a population of 1,827. Ferrum is home to Ferrum College and its Blue Ridge Folklife Festival. It is part of the Roanoke metropolitan area.

== Geography ==
Ferrum is located at 36°55′35″N 80°0′40″W (36.926381, −80.011181). According to the United States Census Bureau, the CDP has a total area of 9.2 square miles (24.0 km^{2}), all land.

== Demographics ==
=== 2020 census ===
As of the 2020 census, Ferrum had a population of 1,827. The median age was 21.7 years. 12.5% of residents were under the age of 18 and 11.5% of residents were 65 years of age or older. For every 100 females there were 117.2 males, and for every 100 females age 18 and over there were 119.3 males age 18 and over.

0.0% of residents lived in urban areas, while 100.0% lived in rural areas.

There were 393 households in Ferrum, of which 19.1% had children under the age of 18 living in them. Of all households, 47.6% were married-couple households, 19.8% were households with a male householder and no spouse or partner present, and 27.5% were households with a female householder and no spouse or partner present. About 33.8% of all households were made up of individuals and 19.1% had someone living alone who was 65 years of age or older.

There were 455 housing units, of which 13.6% were vacant. The homeowner vacancy rate was 2.3% and the rental vacancy rate was 3.2%.

Racial composition as of the 2020 census
Race	Number	Percent
White	1,494	81.8%
Black or African American	179	9.8%
American Indian and Alaska Native	6	0.3%
Asian	39	2.1%
Native Hawaiian and Other Pacific Islander	13	0.7%
Some other race	21	1.1%
Two or more races	75	4.1%
Hispanic or Latino (of any race)	126	6.9%

=== 2000 census ===
At the 2000 census there were 1,313 people, 285 households, and 169 families in the CDP. The population density was 141.9 people per square mile (54.8/km^{2}). There were 307 housing units at an average density of 33.2/sq mi (12.8/km^{2}). The racial makeup of the CDP was 80.81% White, 16.22% African American, 0.23% Native American, 0.69% Asian, 0.91% from other races, and 1.14% from two or more races. Hispanic or Latino of any race were 1.68%.

Of the 285 households 32.6% had children under the age of 18 living with them, 48.8% were married couples living together, 6.7% had a female householder with no husband present, and 40.4% were non-families. 33.0% of households were one person and 7.7% were one person aged 65 or older. The average household size was 2.38 and the average family size was 3.07.

The age distribution was 13.6% under the age of 18, 53.4% from 18 to 24, 17.2% from 25 to 44, 11.2% from 45 to 64, and 4.6% 65 or older. The median age was 21 years. For every 100 females there were 122.2 males. For every 100 females age 18 and over, there were 131.0 males.

The median household income was $35,208 and the median family income was $46,818. Males had a median income of $27,938 versus $22,917 for females. The per capita income for the CDP was $12,276. About 4.0% of families and 9.7% of the population were below the poverty line, including none of those under the age of eighteen or sixty-five or over.

== Point of interest ==
Ferrum is home to Ferrum College, a small college of approximately 1,500 students.
