= Tri-State Airport =

Airport in Huntington, West Virginia, United States

Tri-State Airport Milton J. Ferguson Field

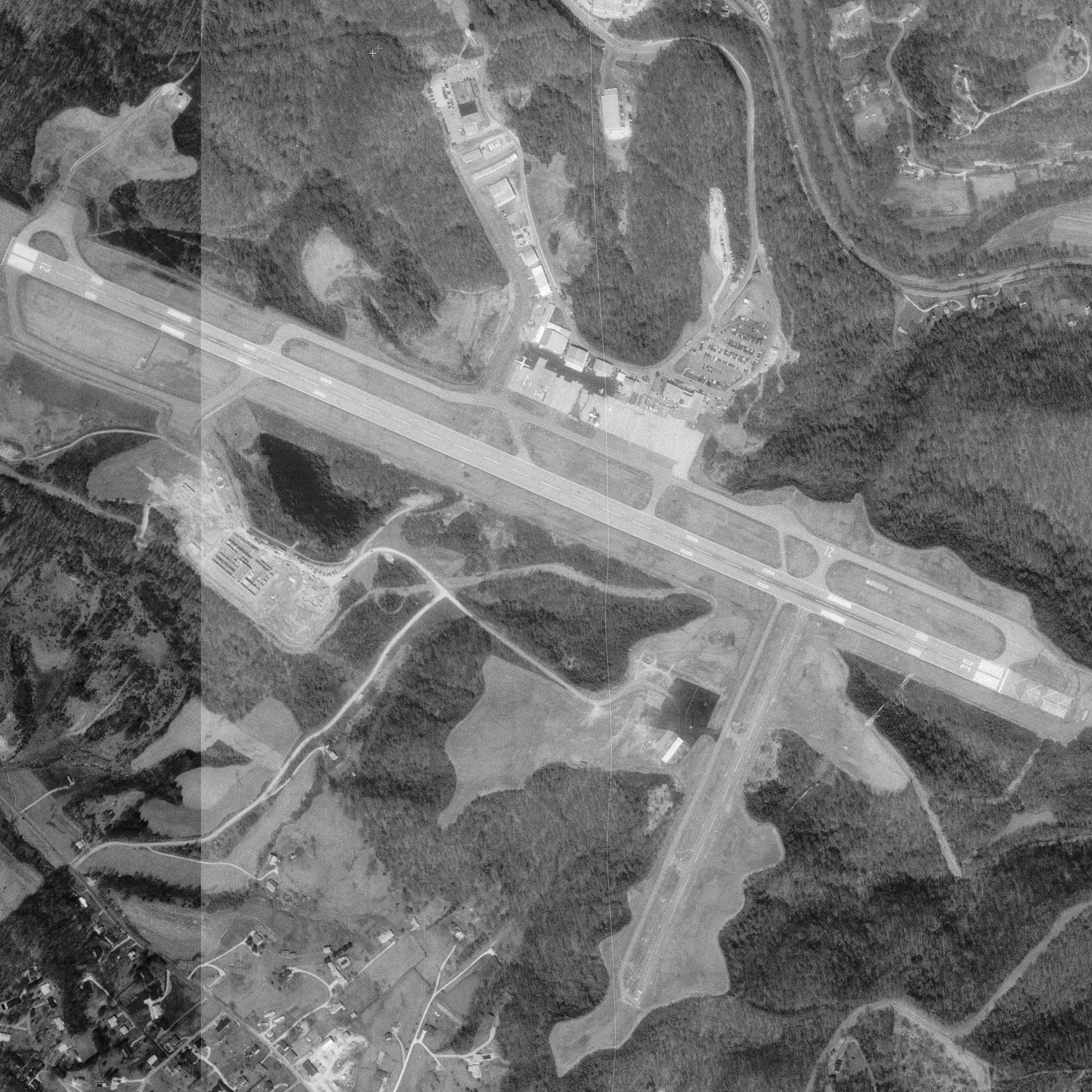
- USGS image 1995
- IATA: HTS; ICAO: KHTS; FAA LID: HTS

Summary
- Airport type: Public
- Owner: Tri-State Airport Authority
- Serves: Huntington–Ashland metropolitan area
- Elevation AMSL: 828 ft (252 m)
- Coordinates: 38°22′01″N 082°33′31″W
- Website: www.tristateairport.com

Maps
- FAA airport diagram
- Interactive map of Tri-State Airport

Runways
Direction	Length		Surface
Direction	ft	m	Surface
12/30	7,017	2,139	Asphalt

Statistics (2024)
- Aircraft operations: 14,924
- Based aircraft: 36
- Total passengers: 182,000
- Source: Federal Aviation Administration

Tri-State Airport (IATA: HTS, ICAO: KHTS, FAA LID: HTS) (Milton J. Ferguson Field) is a public airport in Wayne County, West Virginia, United States, three miles south of Huntington, West Virginia, near Ceredo and Kenova. Owned by the Tri-State Airport Authority, it serves Huntington; Ashland, Kentucky; and Ironton, Ohio. It has heavy use for general aviation, and after the withdrawal of Delta Air Lines in June 2012, it was down to two airlines, one of which provides nationwide connecting service. In addition, there is one cargo airline flying to the airport, for a total of three commercial airlines serving it. On August 2, 2021, a federal subsidy was announced to subsidize flights to Washington-Dulles and Chicago-O'Hare airports. It is not yet known which airline will operate the flights.

Federal Aviation Administration records say the airport had 115,263 passenger boardings (enplanements) in calendar year 2010, 10.9% more than 2009. The Federal Aviation Administration (FAA) National Plan of Integrated Airport Systems for 2017–2021 categorized it as a non-hub primary commercial service facility.

The first airline flights were Piedmont DC-3s around the end of 1952; Eastern and Allegheny arrived in 1953. Eastern left about the end of 1972; Piedmont and Allegheny remained through the 1989 merger. The first jets were Piedmont 737s in 1969 (the runway was then 5280 feet).

Eastern Airlines provided jet service beginning July 1, 1968 using a DC-9 jet. According to the Eastern Airlines timetable, effective June 21, 1968, the routing was LEX-HTS-EWR. HTS had 5 other EA in the same schedule with 1 on a Lockheed Electra & the other 4 on Convair 440s. By 1970, all flights were flown with 727's, one operated a SDF-LEX-HTS-CRW-DCA routing.

The airport is the second busiest airport in West Virginia after Yeager Airport in Charleston, West Virginia. Huntington Tri-State airport has the second longest runway in West Virginia. The airport is replacing lights in the terminal and hangars with LED lights as of November 2021.

== Facilities ==
The airport covers 1,300 acres (526 ha) at an elevation of 828 feet (252 m). It has one runway, 12/30, 7,017 by 150 feet (2,139 x 46 m) asphalt.

In the year ending December 31, 2022 the airport had 11,114 aircraft operations, average 30 per day: 54% general aviation, 25% air taxi, 16% airline, and 5% military. In December 2022, 36 aircraft were based at the airport: 26 single-engine, 6 multi-engine, 2 jet, and 2 ultralight. The airport has the only FedEx B-757 hub in West Virginia.

== Economic impact ==
A study by Marshall University's Center for Business and Economic Research (CBER) in 2006 published a finding that the economic output was $50.4 million, with an income of $21.1 million, 803 jobs and $3.5 million in state and local tax revenue.

A series of Airport Improvement Projects (AIPS) was completed from 2006 to 2014 at a total cost of $39,226,015.00 based on $36,716,290.00 federal funds, $1,141,993.53 state funds, and $322,966.90 local funds.

== Airlines and destinations ==
=== Passenger ===
Airlines	Destinations	Refs
Allegiant Air	Orlando/Sanford,St. Petersburg/Clearwater	
American Eagle	Charlotte	

=== Cargo ===
Airlines	Destinations	Refs
FedEx Express	Memphis	

Destinations map
Destinations from Tri-State Airport
Red = Year-round destination
Green = Seasonal destination
Blue = Future destination

=== Top destinations ===
Top domestic destinations out of HTS (August 2024 – July 2025)
Rank	City	Airport	Passengers	Carriers
1	Charlotte, North Carolina	CLT	35,310	American
2	St. Petersburg-Clearwater, Florida	PIE	24,830	Allegiant
3	Orlando, Florida	SFB	21,270	Allegiant
4	Myrtle Beach, South Carolina	MYR	7,960	Allegiant
5	Fort Walton Beach, Florida	VPS	5,360	Allegiant
6	Punta Gorda, Florida	PGD	2,940	Allegiant
7	Fort Lauderdale, Florida	FLL	2,500	Allegiant

== Incidents ==
- On October 30, 1970 a United States Army U-8 crashed 0.75 miles (1.21 km) west of the airport while making an emergency landing in rain and fog, killing three of the four passengers, including Major general Edwin H. Burba.
- On November 14, 1970, in what has been recognized as "the worst sports related air tragedy in U.S. history," Southern Airways Flight 932, a chartered Southern Airways DC-9, crashed into a hill just short of runway 12 (then runway 11, due to differences in magnetic declination between 1970 and today). The flight carried 37 members of the Marshall University "Thundering Herd" football team, eight members of the coaching staff, and 25 boosters. There were no survivors. The tragedy was the basis of the 2006 film We Are Marshall.
- On January 30, 2009 a Piper PA-34-200T Seneca crashed near KHTS in a snowstorm. The pilot was trying to divert to KHTS due to a fuel emergency; all six aboard were killed.

== See also ==
- List of airports in West Virginia
- Transportation in Huntington, West Virginia
