= Booster club =

Contributes money to an associated club, sports team, or organization

Booster clubs are organizations in schools at the high school and university level. The clubs are generally run and organized by the parents of the students in the supported organization in high schools, and by athletic supporters and fans at colleges. Its main function is to develop support for the student program and raise funds for it.

They are called "Parents and Citizens Clubs" in Australian schools.

For example, fundraisers are often held to raise money for supplies or equipment that the students may need or for trips that the students may need to take. The main principle of funding by a U.S. IRS 501(c)(3) nonprofit is that the booster club may not discriminate in making grants to youth or college students on the basis of their family's membership in or funding to the club, or the family's fund-raising or time put into club activities.

A popular way for booster clubs to raise money is with clothing such as t-shirts with the school's name and mascot on it, or the sale of popcorn, hot dogs, and other food items to the fans who attend a game, tournament, or other athletic event. Membership fees are also a key fundraising element, especially at the college level. With the popularity of the internet and social media, many programs are turning to online crowdfunding platforms to reach out for additional support.

At the high school level, school administrators cannot be involved in the booster club organization except approving activities held at the high school.

At the collegiate level, the NCAA strictly regulates the activities of booster clubs and strictly defines what actions would cause a person to be considered an official booster of an athletic program. Many scandals have resulted from prohibited activities by patrons, particularly those providing monetary or in-kind incentives for prospective athletes to sign with a particular university.

Booster clubs exist in Major League Baseball, but not as prevalent as the high school and collegiate levels. Its members are local businesspeople who volunteer to promote ballclubs and its season ticket sales and perform charitable acts locally and beyond. Notable examples include the Baltimore Orioles' Oriole Advocates, the Cleveland Guardians' 455 Club (formerly the Wahoo Club) and the Kansas City Royals' Royal Lancers.
