= Huntington, West Virginia =

City in West Virginia, US

- City
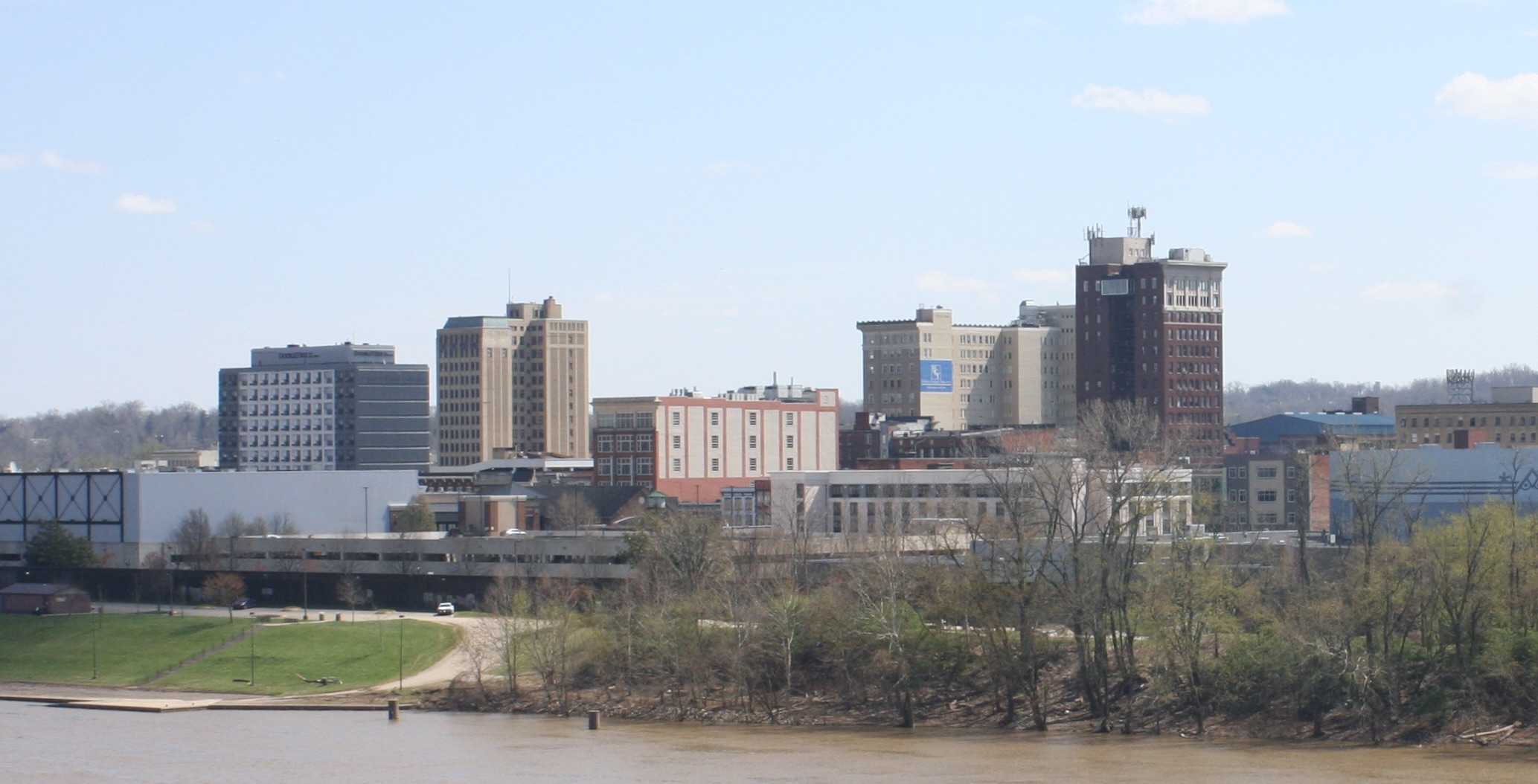
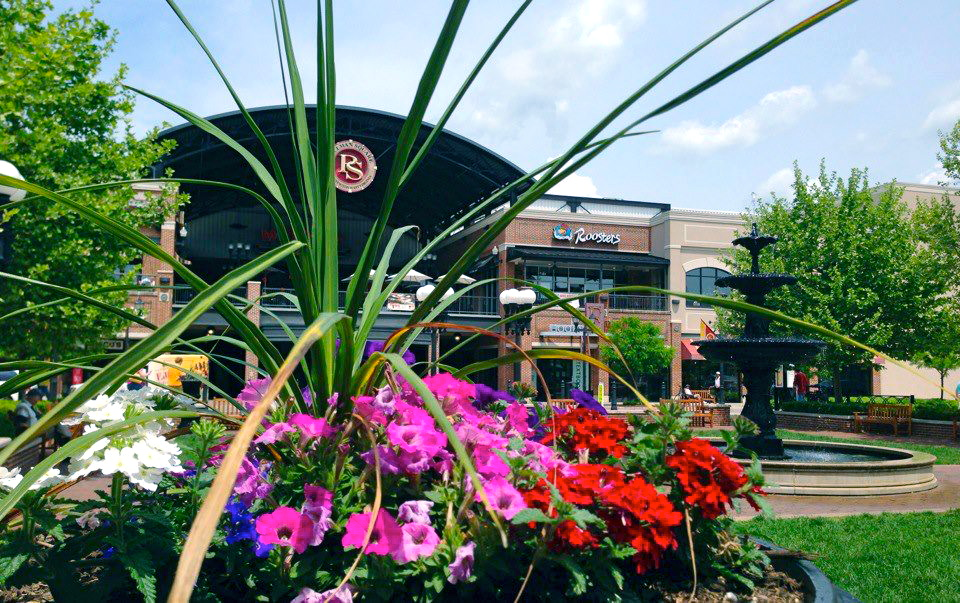
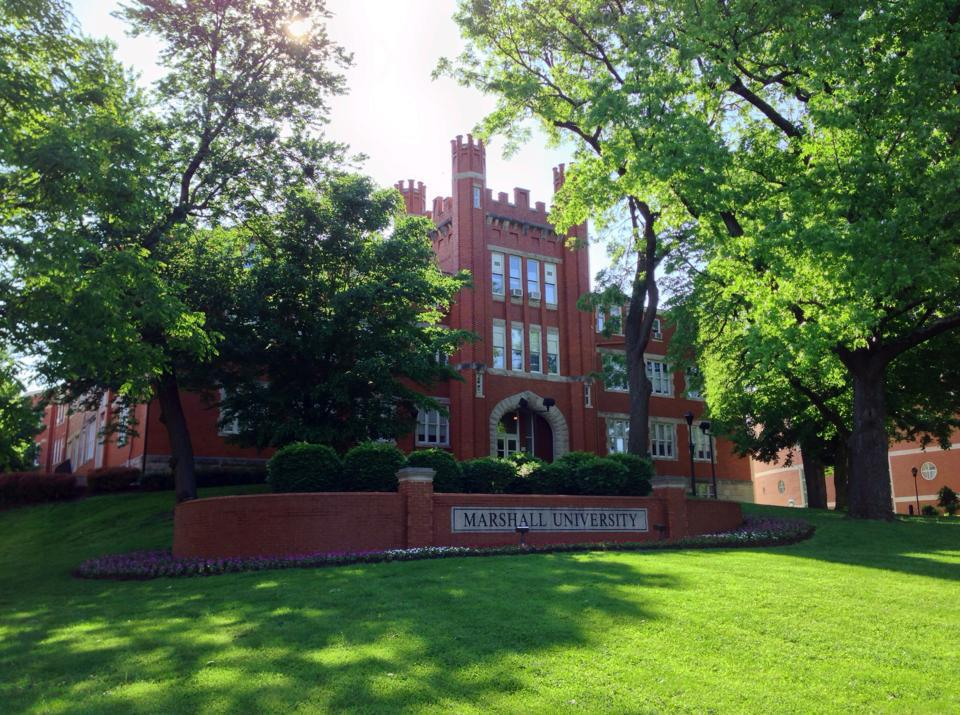
- Downtown Huntington Ritter Park Heritage Station Pullman Square Marshall University

- Flag Seal Logo
- Nicknames: The Jewel City, The River City, The River & Rail City, Train City
- Interactive map of Huntington, West Virginia
- Location within West Virginia Location within the United States
- Coordinates: 38°25′9.30″N 82°26′42.55″W
- Country: United States
- State: West Virginia
- Counties: Cabell, Wayne
- First Settled: 1775 (Holderby's Landing)
- Founded: 1871
- Incorporated: 1799 (Guyandotte)
- Incorporated: February 27, 1871 (Huntington)
- Founder: Collis P. Huntington, Delos W. Emmons

Government
  - Type: Mayor-Council
  - Mayor: Patrick Farrell (R)

Area
  - City: 18.461 sq mi (47.814 km^{2})
  - Land: 16.219 sq mi (42.008 km^{2})
  - Water: 2.242 sq mi (5.808 km^{2})
- Elevation: 564 ft (172 m)

Population (2020)
  - City: 46,842
  - Estimate (2024): 44,942
  - Rank: US: 886th WV: 2nd
  - Density: 2,790/sq mi (1,079/km^{2})
  - Urban: 200,157 (US: 191st)
  - Metro: 368,261 (US: 152nd)
  - Combined: 643,394 (US: 81st)
- Demonym: Huntingtonian
- Time zone: UTC−5 (Eastern (EST))
  - Summer (DST): UTC−4 (EDT)
- ZIP Codes: 25701–25729, 25755, 25770–25779
- Area codes: 304 and 681
- FIPS code: 54-39460
- GNIS feature ID: 1540605
- Highways: US-60, I-64, SR-101, SR-106, SR-152, and SR-527
- Sales tax: 7.0%
- Website: cityofhuntington.com

Huntington is a city in Cabell and Wayne counties in the U.S. state of West Virginia. It is the county seat of Cabell County and sits at the confluence of the Ohio and Guyandotte rivers in the southwestern part of the state. With a population of 46,842 at the 2020 census (estimated at 44,942 in 2024), Huntington is the second-most populous city in West Virginia. The Huntington–Ashland metropolitan area, spanning seven counties across West Virginia, Kentucky and Ohio, has an estimated 368,000 residents.

Surrounded by extensive natural resources, the area was first settled in 1775 as Holderby's Landing. Its location was selected as ideal for the western terminus of the Chesapeake and Ohio Railway, which founded Huntington as one of the nation's first planned communities to facilitate transportation industries. The city quickly developed after the railroad's completion in 1871 and is eponymously named for the railroad company's founder, Collis Potter Huntington. The city became a hub for manufacturing, transportation, and industrialization, with an industrial sector based in coal, oil, chemicals and steel. After World War II, due to the shutdown of these industries, the city lost nearly 46% of its population, from a peak of 86,353 in 1950 to 54,844 in 1990.

Huntington is a vital rail-to-river transfer point for the marine transportation industry. It is home to the Port of Huntington Tri-State, the second-busiest inland port in the United States. It is also considered a scenic locale in the western foothills of the Appalachian Mountains. The city is the home of Marshall University as well as the Huntington Museum of Art, Marshall Health Network Arena, Camden Park, one of the world's oldest amusement parks; and the headquarters of the CSX Transportation-Huntington Division.

== History ==
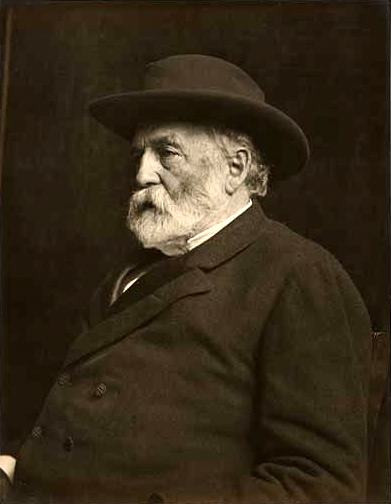
Collis P. Huntington, founder of the city of Huntington

Discounting the period of French ownership, the land that was part of Guyandotte and later Huntington was originally part of the 28,628-acre (115.85 km^{2}) French and Indian War veteran's Savage Grant. The area of greater Huntington, although situated in a Southern state, was long considered a western city in what was then the Colony of Virginia since the first permanent settlements were founded in 1775 in defiance of British injunctions against settlements west of the Alleghenies in the vicinity of Holderby's Landing.

=== 19th century ===
Historically, the old Federal Era town of Guyandotte was first built upon in 1799 by French settlers of the Ohio Valley. A farmer, James Holderby (1782–1855) purchased the lands in 1821 upon which much of Huntington now stands which is why the area was known as Holderby's Landing prior to 1870 when it was incorporated and renamed; Holderby's estate included the lands gifted in 1837 to found what is now Marshall University. The town of Guyandotte was officially absorbed in 1891.

The modern City of Huntington was founded by Collis P. Huntington as the western terminus for the Chesapeake and Ohio Railway (C&O) on a tract of land west of the mouth of the Guyandotte River, between the Ohio River and Twelve Pole Creek. Collis P. Huntington was one of the "Big Four" of western railroading who built the Central Pacific Railroad as part of the first U.S. transcontinental railroad (along with Leland Stanford, Mark Hopkins, and Charles Crocker).

Collis Huntington left Delos W. Emmons in charge of his new namesake city while he was off doing business in other states. Delos's son, Arthur S. Emmons, named the Emmons Apartments after Emmons, completed in 1912. They stood in Downtown Huntington until they were destroyed by a multi-fatality fire, in 2007. Delos Emmons was married to Mary Huntington Emmons, the sister of Collis P. Huntington, and had three sons: Carlton Emmons, J. Alden "Ollie" Emmons, and Arthur S. Emmons, each of whom had pivotal roles in Huntington's growth. Emmons had a number of grandchildren including Carlton Emmons' son Delos Carleton Emmons.

Huntington was created as a hub for the C&O, which, once completed in 1873, fulfilled a long-held dream of the Virginias to have a rail link from the James River at Richmond, Virginia to the Ohio River Valley. The new railroad facilities adjacent to the Ohio River resulted in expansion of the former small town of Guyandotte into part of a large new city called Huntington. The C&O Railroad expanded east to Newport News (and coal piers), and west to eventually reach Cincinnati and Chicago in later years. After merging with several other railroads, C&O is now known as CSX Transportation.

The city was incorporated in 1871 just west of the earlier city of Guyandotte. Guyandotte, which became a neighborhood of Huntington in 1891, was founded in 1799 on land that was originally part of the 28,628-acre (115.85 km^{2}) French and Indian War veteran's Savage Grant. Meriwether Lewis passed the Guyandotte and Big Sandy River peninsula on or about September 20, 1803, on his way down the Ohio River before meeting up with William Clark in Clarksville, Ind.

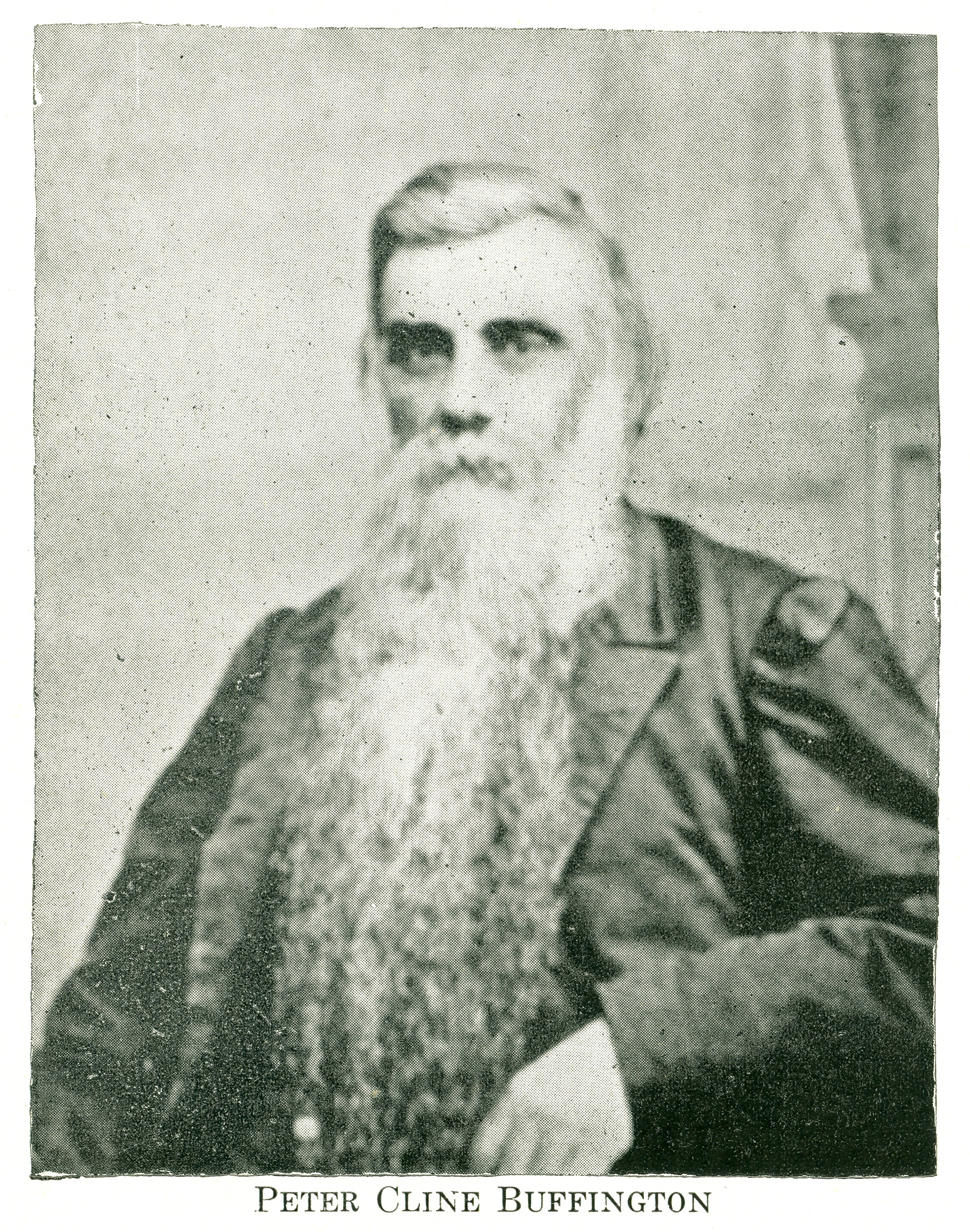
Peter Cline Buffington was the first mayor of Huntington

An election was held on December 31, 1871, where Peter Cline Buffington was elected the first mayor of Huntington. A police force was created almost immediately after the election of a marshal, however before the city was six months old the marshal was authorized to appoint a special police force to handle a large crowd that was attending a circus in the city. In the fall of 1872, the city faced a smallpox outbreak.

The Huntington Bank was robbed on September 6, 1875, by a band of horseman who escaped out of Wayne County. The city pursued the robbers and captured Thomas J. Webb. He was convicted of the robbery on December 4, 1875, and sentenced to 14 years in prison, where he died. Local legend has held that these robbers were members of the Jesse James Gang, but both Frank and Jesse James were nowhere near Huntington at this point in time, so the story of their involvement is not factual.

=== 20th century ===
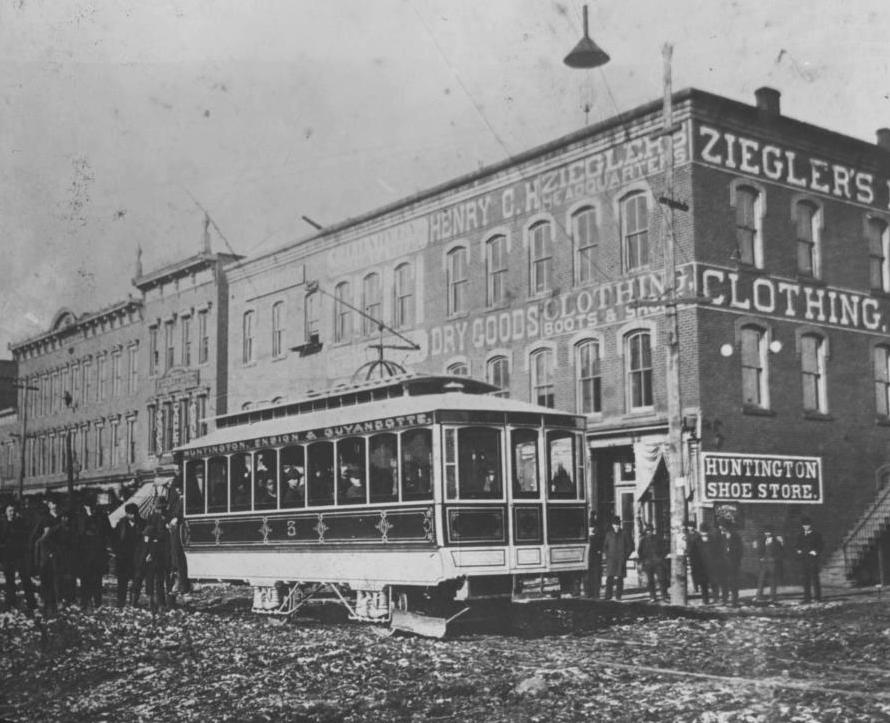
Huntington's first electric streetcar on Third Avenue in 1888

Huntington first had electrified streetcars in 1888. The streetcar network expanded across the city and into neighboring cities of Ashland, Kentucky and Ironton, Ohio and served over 125,000 people. Huntington became the first city in West Virginia to switch its transportation system entirely to gasoline-powered buses in 1937. Some of the old streetcar tracks can still be seen in city streets. Camden Park, which at 110 years old is one of the world's oldest amusement parks, was built in 1903 to encourage ridership on the trolleys (then owned by the Camden Interstate Railway Company).

Huntington's "boom" period occurred from the founding in 1871 until the Great Flood of 1937, which claimed 5 lives, caused millions of dollars in damage, left tens of thousands homeless, and led to the creation of Huntington's flood walls in 1938. Of the 40,000 people living in the flooded areas of Huntington, 25,000 were made refugees as fresh water and fuel was scarce. 11,000 people applied for Red Cross aid during the flood and the relief period.

As Manager of Operations in 1921, John Fairfield Thompson supervised the construction and initial operations of the International Nickel Company's plant and rolling mill. They were founded by Inco's President Robert C. Stanley for the production of high-nickel alloys. As of 2025, this plant continued part of the Special Metals Corporation.

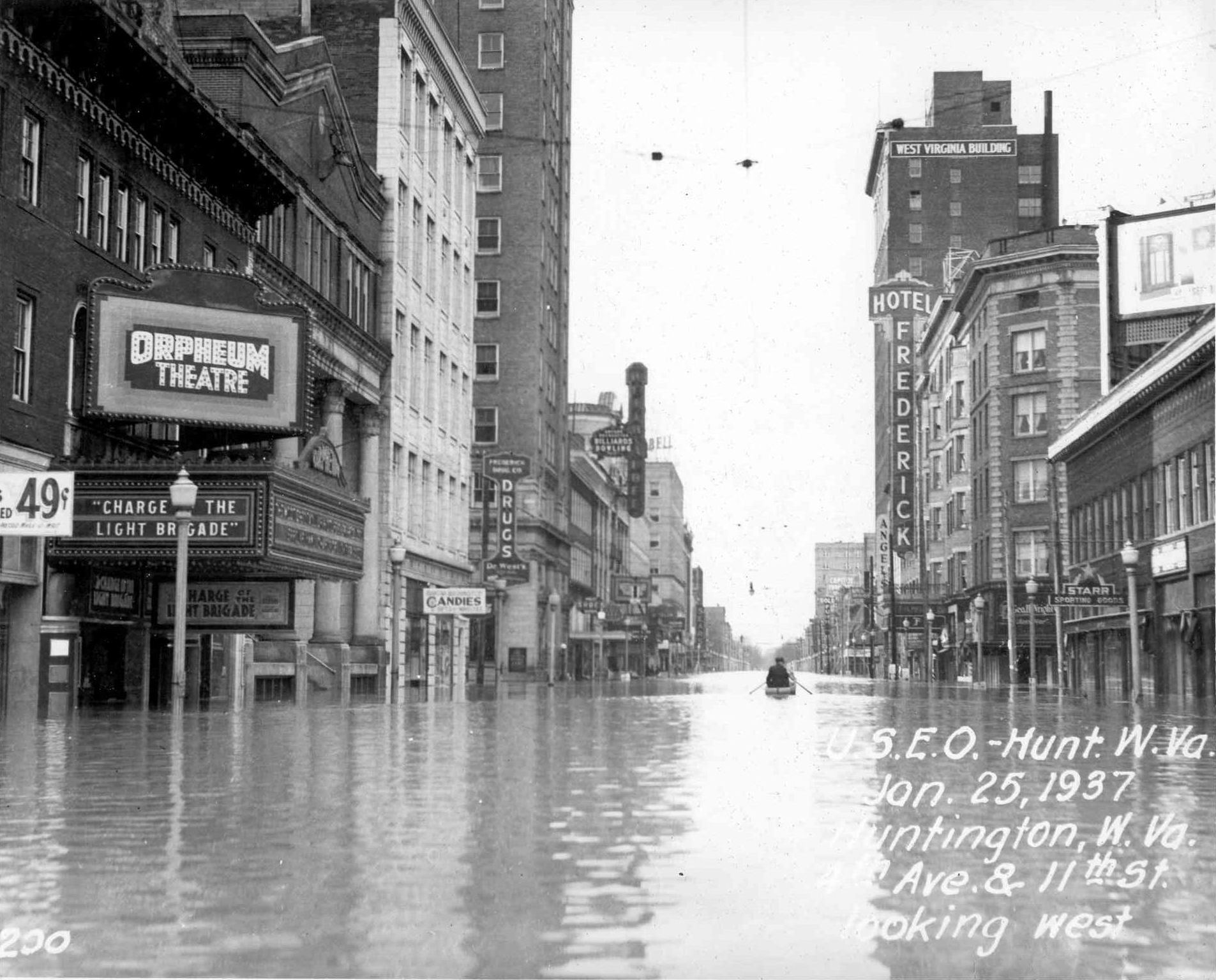
Fourth Avenue during the Ohio River Flood of 1937

World War II brought another economic boom, but that was short-lived and ended along with the war in the 1940s. Huntington's population began to drop after 1950 because of urban sprawl and the decline of the steel and manufacturing industries. In the 1970s, federal urban renewal programs destroyed several parts of downtown. The industrial base continued to expand through the 1970s, but beginning in the early 1980s the steel and manufacturing industry in the region imploded, with massive layoffs and mill and plant closures.

A shift to the city's economic base began in the late 1980s to focus more on education, tourism, and services, based mainly on healthcare/medicine and biotechnology. Although Huntington successfully shifted the focus of its economy, the population has never rebounded to its industrial-era highs. While 86,353 people lived in the city proper in 1950, a combination of suburbanization and economic turbulence caused a sharp decrease in population to just 51,475 in 2000.

=== 21st century ===
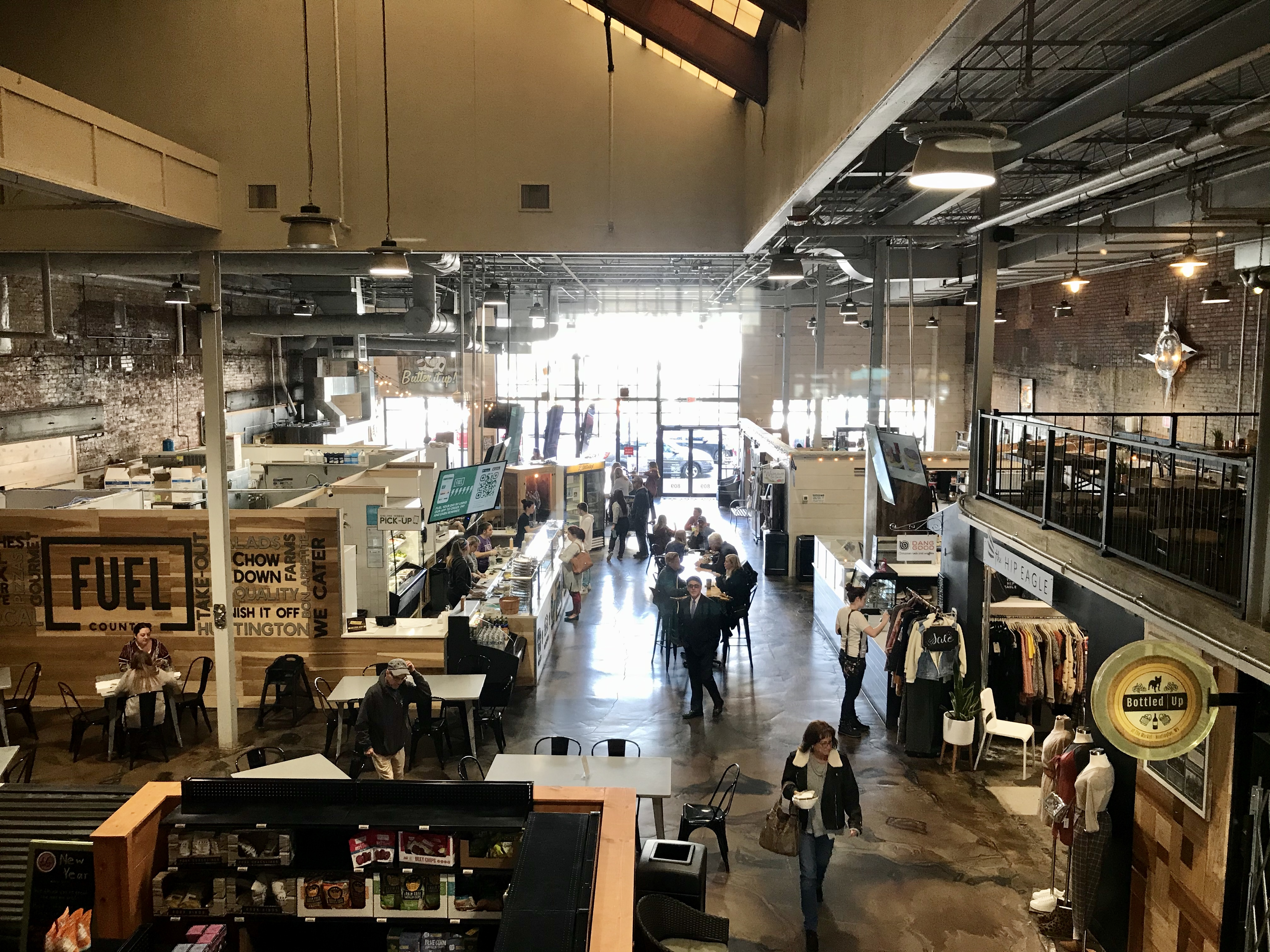
The Market (formerly the Huntington Theater), now home to numerous shops and restaurants

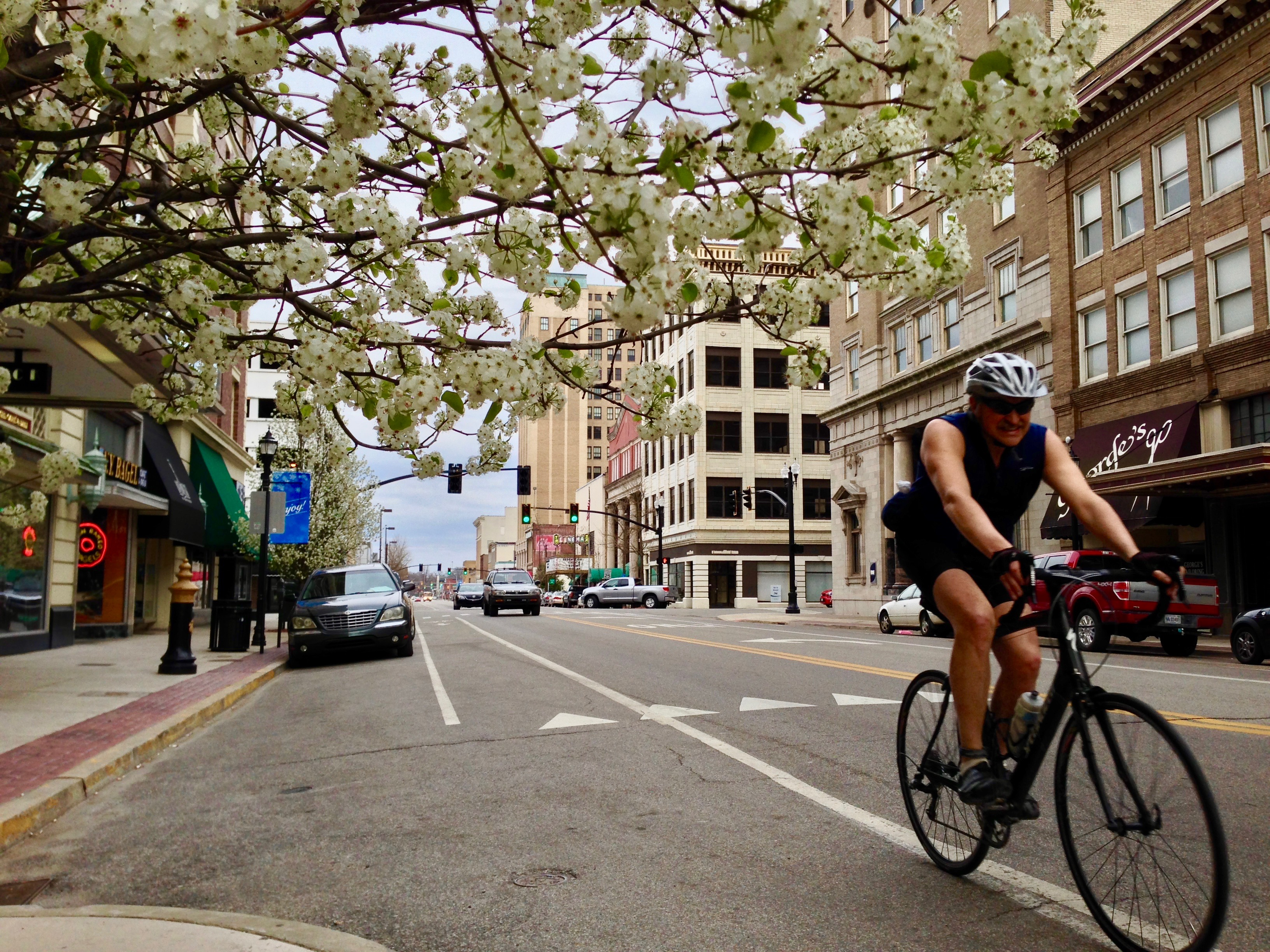
A cyclist on Fourth Avenue in downtown Huntington

Huntington has seen a major revival since the opening of the Pullman Square Town Center on the vacant lot formerly known as the "Superblock" in 2005, the filming of the Warner Bros. motion picture We Are Marshall in 2006, and the filming of ABC's Food Revolution in 2010. The modern Huntington Metro Area spans 7 counties across 3 states and is the largest in West Virginia with a population of more than 360,000. The largest employers are Marshall University, Cabell Huntington Hospital, St. Mary's Medical Center, Amazon, DirecTV, and the City of Huntington.

Shortly after Pullman Square was constructed, the city began work on upgrading the streetscape on Fourth Avenue and Ninth Street. Ninth Street was formerly known as the Ninth Street Plaza and was closed to vehicle traffic for many years. Once anchored by Pullman Square on the north end, the old plaza was removed in 2006 and Ninth Street has once again become attractive to businesses. Fourth Avenue, known as the "Old Main Corridor", has been upgraded with new lighting, artistic and pedestrian-friendly design concepts, and bicycle lanes.

Efforts to redevelop Huntington started with the construction of the $10.5 million Huntington Civic Arena, which was the largest arena in the state when it opened in 1977. The 25-year delay in construction of what became Pullman Square caused the building to become a money losing effort for the city and is now managed privately by SMG. After renovation in 1997, and 2010, the arena has now been included in Billboard's "New or Renovated Venues to Watch" list for 2013. Huntington's arena landed at No. 14 in a list of 17 venues across the globe. The exterior was also renovated in 2020–2021.

The Huntington Mall, the largest mall in the state, opened a few years after the Arena in 1981. When the mall was built, the only other businesses around it were two bars and a gas station. Since the mall's opening, several retailers have built around the mall, including four hotels and several restaurants, as well as a Walmart Supercenter, the first Best Buy in West Virginia, and the first Sheetz gas station/convenience store in southern West Virginia. The Huntington Mall has a yearly economic impact of close to $400 million.

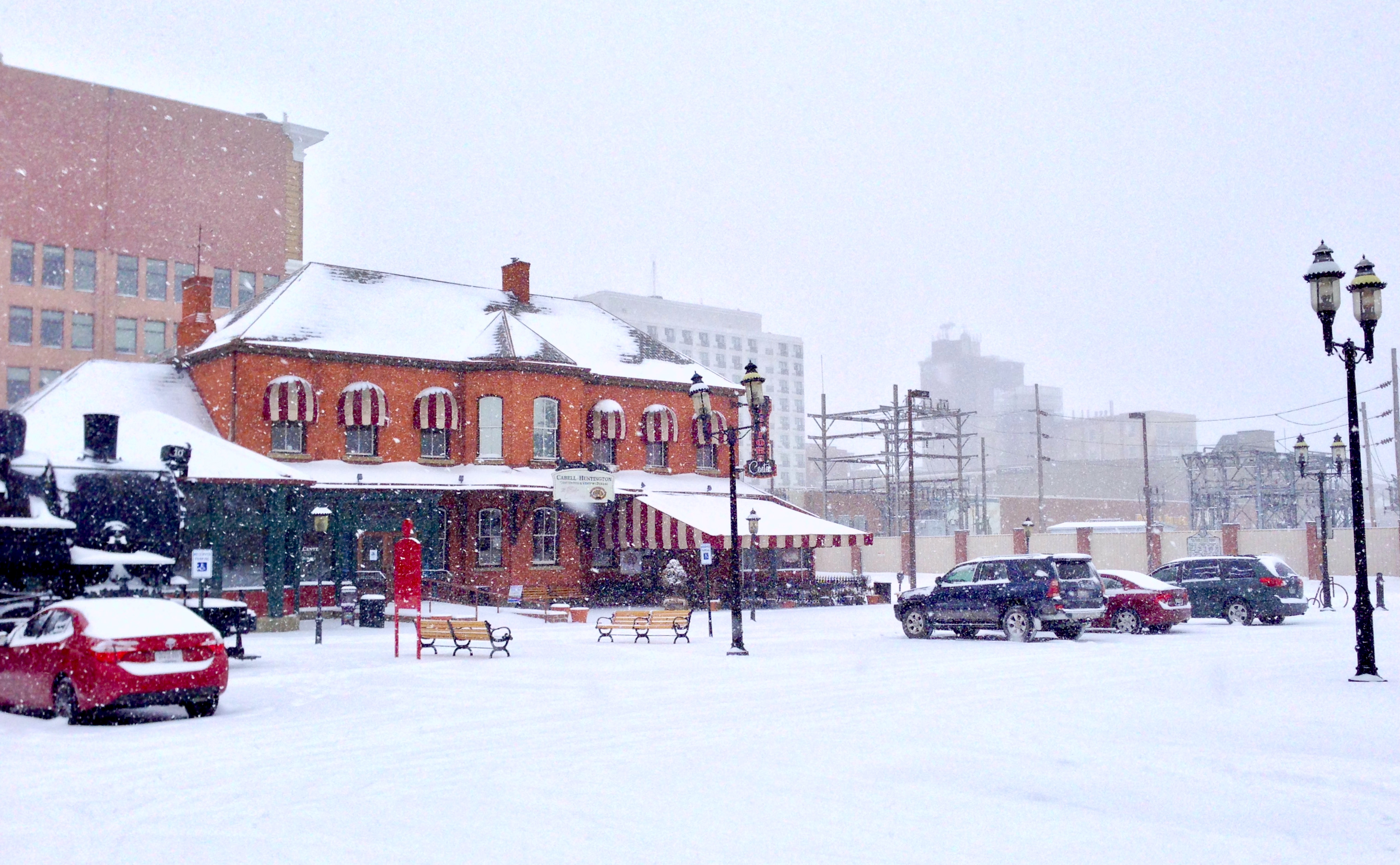
The Huntington Welcome Center and the Shops at Heritage Station

The Shops at Heritage Station are in the old Baltimore and Ohio Railroad Depot, originally constructed in 1887. The complex includes an original steam engine with a "Pullman" train car, and a building that used to house one of Huntington's first banks—which was the easternmost bank robbed by the James-Younger Gang. That structure is currently occupied by a specialty beer and cheese shop. Heritage Station was turned into a shopping center called "Heritage Village" during the dark days of Urban Renewal in the 1970s. For decades, the station sat hidden and virtually unused just two blocks from the city center, until Create Huntington got involved in 2006. Today, Heritage Station is an artisan retail complex, with locally owned shops, and home to public events like the annual Diamond Teeth Mary Blues Festival, named for the blues singer born in the town.

In 2017, Huntington joined a host of other municipalities and local governments in the area suing eight pharmaceutical companies, claiming their products harmed Huntington's welfare, leading to a drug crisis in the city and surrounding county. Included in the lawsuits are companies like McKesson Corp., Cardinal Health and AmerisourceBergen Drug Corp, among others.

== Geography ==
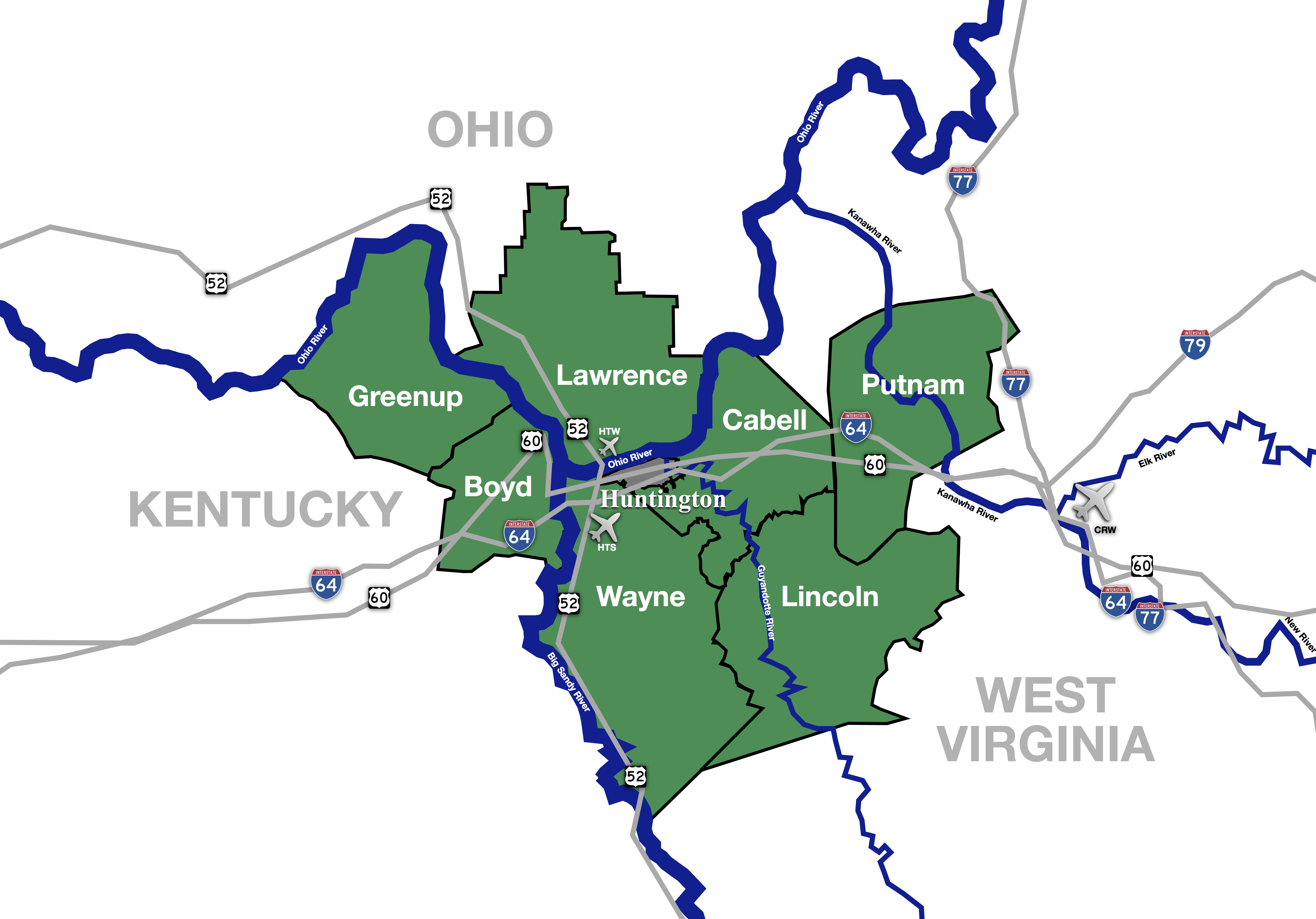
Map of the Huntington–Ashland metropolitan area

Huntington is located in the southwestern corner of West Virginia, on the border with Ohio, on the southern bank of the Ohio River, at the confluence with the Guyandotte River. The city lies at 38°25′9.30″N 82°26′42.55″W (38.4192496, -82.4451540), with an elevation of 564 feet (172 m) above sea level. According to the United States Census Bureau, the city has an area of 18.461 square miles (47.81 km^{2}), of which 16.219 square miles (42.01 km^{2}) is land and 2.242 square miles (5.81 km^{2}) is water. The Guyandotte River joins the Ohio River about 5 miles (8.0 km) east of downtown. Huntington fills the roughly three-mile wide flood plain of the south bank of the Ohio River for eighty square blocks and portions of the hills to the immediate south and southeast.

Most of the city lies within Cabell County, of which it is the county seat, although the westernmost portion, mainly the neighborhood of Westmoreland, lies in Wayne County. Modern day Huntington is commonly divided into four main sections. The north–south divider is the CSX railroad tracks, while the east/west divider is First Street.

The Huntington–Ashland metropolitan area is sometimes called KYOWVA, an acronym that refers to the three states that make up the region, (Kentucky, Ohio, and West Virginia). As of the 2020 census, the Huntington Metro Area is the largest in West Virginia with a population of 376,155. Huntington is combined with Charleston, the state capital, as the Huntington-Charleston TV market, the 81st-largest in the nation.

Huntington is within Southern Appalachia, thus influenced by Appalachian Culture, Southern culture. It is often referred to as one of the northernmost cities in the South. The city lies within the ecoregion of the Western Allegheny Plateau.

=== Climate ===
Because of its position in the westernmost and lowest area of the state, the city is on the northern limits of a humid subtropical climate (Köppen Cfa), unlike the "highlands" of West Virginia, which have a snowy humid continental climate. This location gives the city an even four seasons, with each season beginning around the calendar date. Huntington is made humid by the Ohio River, but summers are not as hot as further south and west. Snow generally falls in moderate amounts, accumulating an average 19.8 inches or 50.3 centimeters seasonally, and the greatest 24-hour fall was 21.1 inches or 53.6 centimeters during the March 1993 Storm of the Century. Each year on average, 24 afternoons reach 90 °F (32.2 °C) and 16–17 afternoons stay below freezing. The highest recorded temperature was 108 °F (42.2 °C) on July 28, 1930, and the lowest was −24 °F (−31.1 °C) on February 9, 1899.

Climate data for Huntington, West Virginia (Tri-State Airport) 1991–2020 normals, extremes 1891–present
Month	Jan	Feb	Mar	Apr	May	Jun	Jul	Aug	Sep	Oct	Nov	Dec	Year
Record high °F (°C)	79 (26)	81 (27)	92 (33)	92 (33)	97 (36)	105 (41)	108 (42)	107 (42)	103 (39)	95 (35)	86 (30)	80 (27)	108 (42)
Mean maximum °F (°C)	67.1 (19.5)	70.7 (21.5)	78.3 (25.7)	85.4 (29.7)	88.6 (31.4)	92.2 (33.4)	93.9 (34.4)	93.4 (34.1)	90.8 (32.7)	84.2 (29.0)	75.9 (24.4)	67.8 (19.9)	95.7 (35.4)
Mean daily maximum °F (°C)	43.2 (6.2)	47.3 (8.5)	56.8 (13.8)	68.8 (20.4)	76.2 (24.6)	83.3 (28.5)	86.4 (30.2)	85.5 (29.7)	79.6 (26.4)	68.6 (20.3)	56.6 (13.7)	46.7 (8.2)	66.6 (19.2)
Daily mean °F (°C)	34.8 (1.6)	38.2 (3.4)	46.4 (8.0)	57.2 (14.0)	65.2 (18.4)	72.9 (22.7)	76.4 (24.7)	75.2 (24.0)	68.7 (20.4)	57.4 (14.1)	46.6 (8.1)	38.6 (3.7)	56.5 (13.6)
Mean daily minimum °F (°C)	26.4 (−3.1)	29.1 (−1.6)	36.1 (2.3)	45.5 (7.5)	54.2 (12.3)	62.4 (16.9)	66.4 (19.1)	64.8 (18.2)	57.7 (14.3)	46.1 (7.8)	36.6 (2.6)	30.4 (−0.9)	46.3 (7.9)
Mean minimum °F (°C)	5.7 (−14.6)	10.3 (−12.1)	17.0 (−8.3)	28.2 (−2.1)	36.7 (2.6)	49.5 (9.7)	56.3 (13.5)	54.5 (12.5)	43.0 (6.1)	29.7 (−1.3)	20.0 (−6.7)	12.9 (−10.6)	2.6 (−16.3)
Record low °F (°C)	−21 (−29)	−24 (−31)	−2 (−19)	15 (−9)	27 (−3)	39 (4)	46 (8)	43 (6)	29 (−2)	16 (−9)	4 (−16)	−14 (−26)	−24 (−31)
Average precipitation inches (mm)	3.10 (79)	3.37 (86)	4.16 (106)	3.91 (99)	4.51 (115)	4.20 (107)	5.08 (129)	3.95 (100)	3.16 (80)	3.02 (77)	3.07 (78)	3.57 (91)	45.10 (1,146)
Average snowfall inches (cm)	6.0 (15)	5.8 (15)	4.3 (11)	0.3 (0.76)	0.0 (0.0)	0.0 (0.0)	0.0 (0.0)	0.0 (0.0)	0.0 (0.0)	0.2 (0.51)	0.5 (1.3)	2.7 (6.9)	19.8 (50)
Average precipitation days (≥ 0.01 in)	13.4	12.2	13.5	13.1	13.7	12.5	12.2	9.9	8.3	10.2	10.3	12.8	142.1
Average snowy days (≥ 0.1 in)	4.4	3.7	2.5	0.5	0.0	0.0	0.0	0.0	0.0	0.1	0.8	2.8	14.8
Source: NOAA

== Cityscape ==
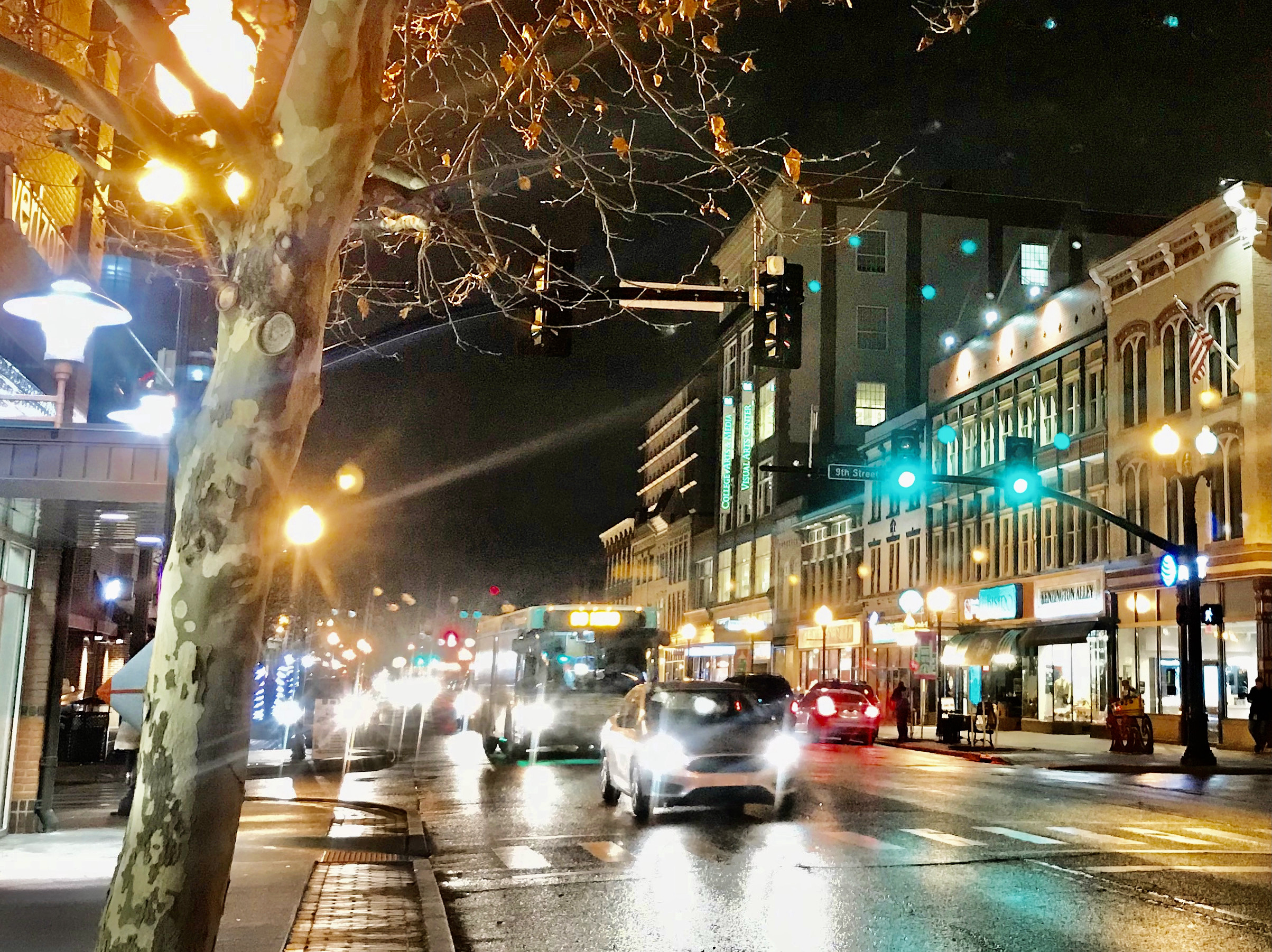
Third Avenue at night, including the Marshall University Visual Arts Center at center

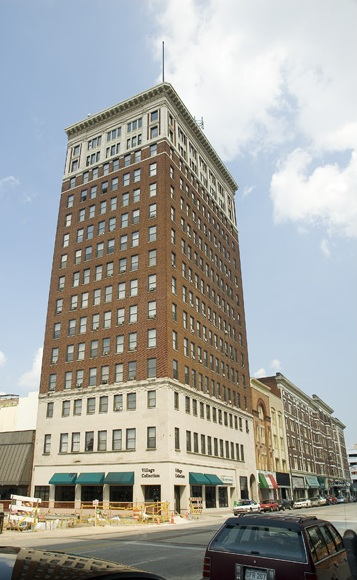
The West Virginia Building is Huntington's tallest building

Huntington's central business district is directly between the Ohio River and the CSX Railroad tracks, east of the Robert C. Byrd Bridge, and west of Hal Greer Blvd (16th Street). There are also 2 smaller business districts: "Old Central City", well known for its antique shops, and one in Guyandotte. The city also has a wealth of architecture, including Gothic, Art Deco, and Edwardian Renaissance, along with many Craftsman, Colonial, Classical, and Tudor Revival homes.

Shortly after Pullman Square was constructed, the city began upgrading the streetscape on 9th Street and the "Old Main Corridor" section of 4th Avenue. 9th Street was formerly known as the Ninth Street Plaza and was closed to vehicle traffic for years, which effectively killed most businesses there. Once anchored by Pullman Square on the north end, the old plaza was removed in 2006 and 9th Street has once again begun attracting businesses. The section of Fourth Avenue that connects downtown to Marshall University, known as the "Old Main Corridor", was also upgraded. The corridor was upgraded with new lighting, artistic and pedestrian-friendly design concepts, and bicycle lanes.

Marshall University purchased the old Anderson-Newcomb/Stone & Thomas Building, which was built in 1902, with the intent of converting that historic structure into a state-of-the-art visual arts center. The goal being to raise the college's presence as an innovative institution, give the visual art program more space to expand, and afford students more opportunities to become engaged in community initiatives and improve the quality of life for everyone in the city.

Since its founding as the western terminus of the C&O Railroad, Huntington has served as a major break of bulk point between rail traffic and the Ohio River/Mississippi River watershed. The Huntington Division is still the largest in the CSX Transportation network. A large portion of the division's revenue comes from hauling coal out of the coalfields of West Virginia and Eastern Kentucky. The Huntington District is the largest of 10 operating divisions on the network. It serves the states of Kentucky, Tennessee, Virginia, West Virginia and Ohio. CSX's Huntington Division main office is in the historic former C&O passenger station downtown.

Several heavy industrial plants line the Ohio River and the Guyandotte River including the Port of Huntington-Tristate, the largest port in West Virginia and the 17th-largest in the United States. It is the nation's second largest inland port. Included in the port's area is 100 miles (160 km) of the Ohio River from the mouth of the Scioto River in Portsmouth, Ohio to the northern border of Gallia County, Ohio, 9 miles (14 km) of the Big Sandy River, and 90 miles (140 km) of the Kanawha River.

=== Neighborhoods ===
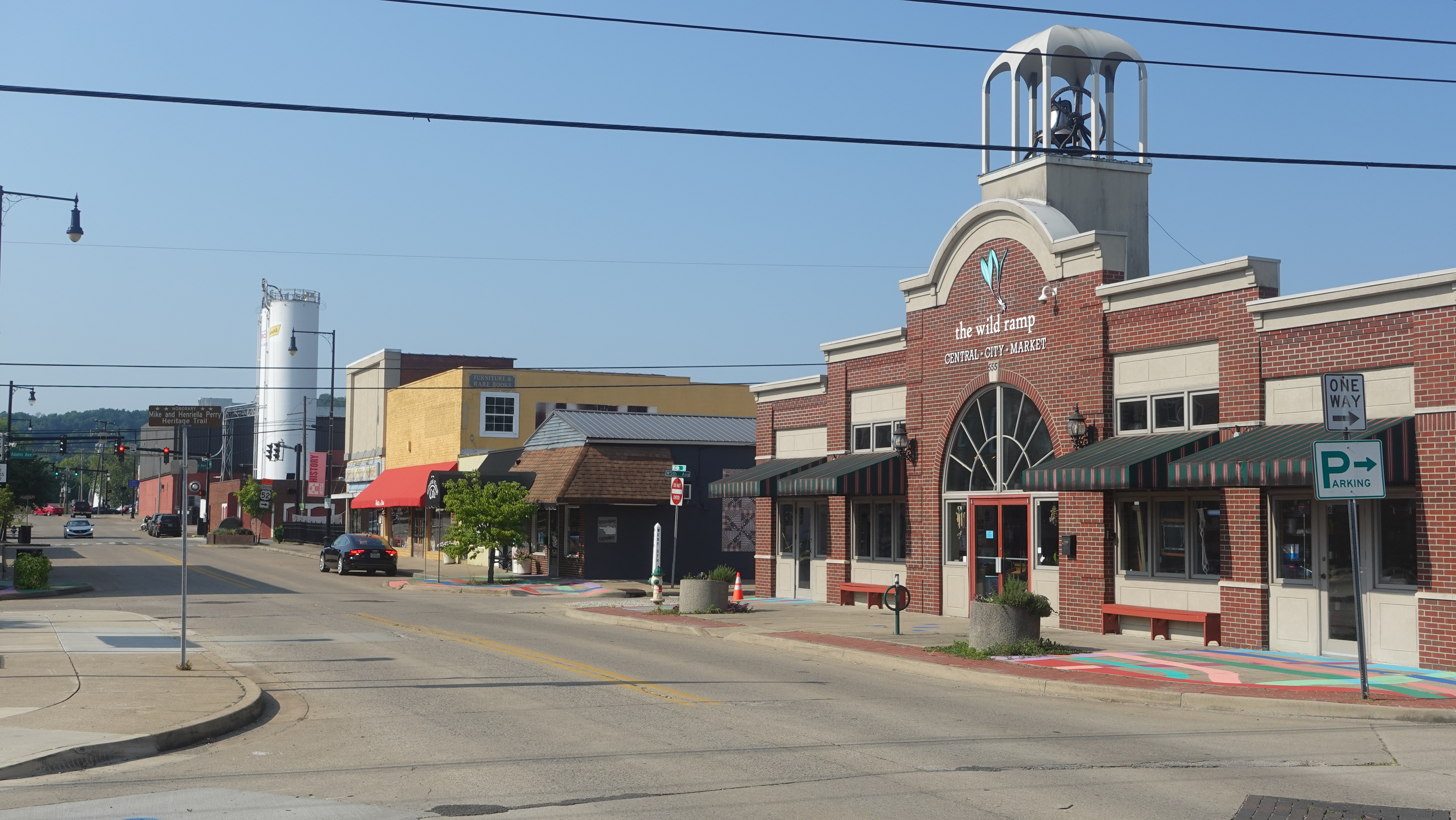
Old Central City in 2024

Historic marker for Guyandotte

Huntington is commonly divided into four main sections. The north-south divider is the CSX railroad tracks, while the east/west divider is First Street. Within those sections, there are many neighborhoods, including:

==== Downtown ====
- Downtown Huntington
- Marshall University Campus

==== West ====
- West Huntington
- Old Central City
- Westmoreland

==== South ====
- Anita Heights
- Beverly Hills/South Hills
- Enslow Park
- Fairfield
- Gaylersville
- Harveytown
- Marcum Terrace
- Reid
- South Side
- Southeast Hills
- Ritter Park

==== East ====
- Walnut Hills
- Forest Hills
- Altizer
- Guyandotte
- Highlawn
- Arlington Park
- Stamford Park

=== Historic Districts ===
==== Downtown Historic District ====
The Downtown Huntington Historic District is a national historic district. The original district encompassed 59 contributing buildings; a boundary increase added 53 more contributing buildings. It includes the central business district and several municipal and governmental buildings. It contains the majority of the historic concentration of downtown commercial buildings.

In the district are the separately listed Carnegie Public Library, Cabell County Courthouse, U.S. Post Office and Court House, and Campbell-Hicks House. It was listed on the National Register of Historic Places in 1986. A boundary increase occurred in 2007. Most notably, the old Davis Opera House/Huntington Theatre has recently been redeveloped into vibrant commercial space featuring more than a dozen shops and restaurants.

==== Ritter Park Historic District ====
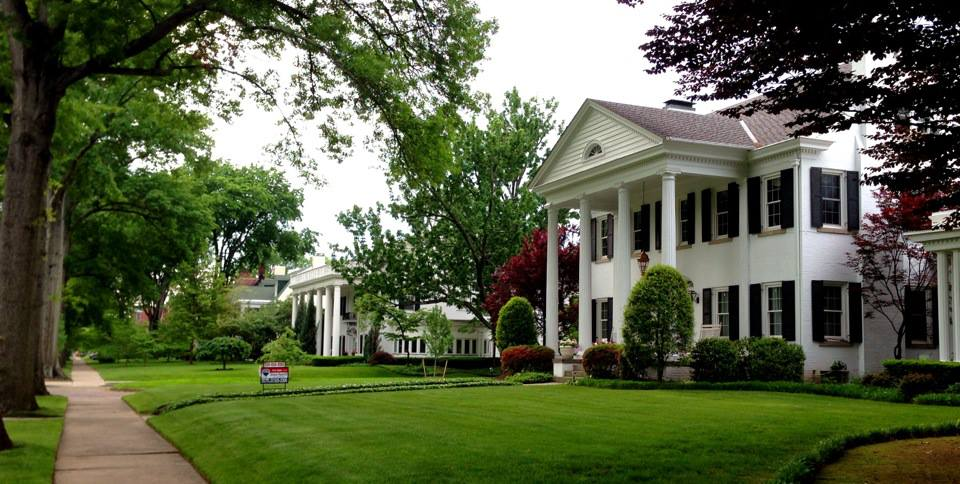
Ritter Park Historic District

The Ritter Park Historic District is a national historic district in South Side. The district encompasses 68 contributing buildings and 5 contributing structures, including the Ritter Park municipal park. The city purchased the park property in 1908. Dwellings in the district represent several architectural styles popular from the years 1913 to 1940, including Colonial Revival, Bungalow/craftsman, and Tudor Revival. It was listed on the National Register of Historic Places in 1990.

==== Other historic districts ====
- 14th Street West Historic District
- Hawthorne Historic District
- Mortimer Place Historic District
- Ninth Street West Historic District

== Demographics ==
Historical population
Census	Pop.	Note	%±
1880	3,174		—
1890	10,108		218.5%
1900	11,923		18.0%
1910	31,161		161.4%
1920	50,177		61.0%
1930	75,572		50.6%
1940	78,836		4.3%
1950	86,353		9.5%
1960	83,627		−3.2%
1970	74,315		−11.1%
1980	63,684		−14.3%
1990	54,844		−13.9%
2000	51,475		−6.1%
2010	49,138		−4.5%
2020	46,842		−4.7%
2024 (est.)	44,942		−4.1%
U.S. Decennial Census; 2020 Census

=== Racial and ethnic composition ===
Huntington, West Virginia – racial and ethnic composition Note: the US Census treats Hispanic/Latino as an ethnic category. This table excludes Latinos from the racial categories and assigns them to a separate category. Hispanics/Latinos may be of any race.
Race / ethnicity (NH = non-Hispanic)	Pop. 2000	Pop. 2010	Pop. 2020	% 2000	% 2010	% 2020
White alone (NH)	45,868	42,287	38,286	89.61%	86.1%	82.5%
Black or African American alone (NH)	3,829	4,155	4,049	7.49%	8.6%	8.7%
Native American or Alaska Native alone (NH)	94	142	133	0.20%	0.3%	0.3%
Asian alone (NH)	417	527	686	0.8%	1.1%	1.5%
Pacific Islander alone (NH)	22	17	19	0.1%	0.0%	0.0%
Other race alone (NH)	62	59	195	0.3%	0.4%	1.0%
Mixed race or multiracial (NH)	746	1,266	2,495	1.5%	2.7%	6.0%
Hispanic or Latino (any race)	437	685	979	0.9%	1.4%	2.1%
Total	51,475	49,138	46,482	100.0%	100.0%	100.0%

=== 2020 census ===
As of the 2020 census, there were 46,842 people in the city; 99.7% lived in urban areas and 0.3% lived in rural areas. The median age was 37.2 years, with 17.6% of residents under the age of 18 and 18.2% 65 years of age or older. For every 100 females there were 94.0 males, and for every 100 females age 18 and over there were 91.5 males age 18 and over.

There were 20,274 households, including 10,049 families. Of these households, 22.5% had children under the age of 18 living in them; 29.6% were married-couple households, 25.6% were households with a male householder and no spouse or partner present, and 35.8% were households with a female householder and no spouse or partner present. About 39.1% of all households were made up of individuals, and 14.1% had someone living alone who was 65 years of age or older.

There were 24,580 housing units, of which 17.5% were vacant. The homeowner vacancy rate was 4.6% and the rental vacancy rate was 13.3%.

Racial composition as of the 2020 census
Race	Number	Percent
White	38,637	82.5%
Black or African American	4,096	8.7%
American Indian and Alaska Native	152	0.3%
Asian	690	1.5%
Native Hawaiian and Other Pacific Islander	19	0.0%
Some other race	446	1.0%
Two or more races	2,802	6.0%
Hispanic or Latino (of any race)	979	2.1%

=== 2022 American Community Survey (ACS) ===
There are 19,411 households accounted for in the 2022 ACS, with an average of 2.23 persons per household. The city's a median gross rent is $841 in the 2022 ACS. The 2022 ACS reports a median household income of $39,066, with 54.4% of households are owner occupied. 28.8% of the city's population lives at or below the poverty line (down from previous ACS surveys). The city boasts a 54.6% employment rate, with 32.3% of the population holding a bachelor's degree or higher and 88.9% holding a high school diploma.

The top one reported ancestry (people were allowed to report up to two ancestries, thus the figures will generally add to more than 100%) were English (21.2%).

=== 2010 census ===
As of the 2010 census, there were 49,138 people, 21,774 households, and 11,000 families residing in the city. The population density was 3,029.3 inhabitants per square mile (1,169.6/km^{2}). There were 25,146 housing units at an average density of 1,550.3 inhabitants per square mile (598.6/km^{2}). The racial makeup of the city was 86.9% White, 8.6% African American, 0.3% Native American, 1.1% Asian, 0.4% from other races, and 2.7% from two or more races. Hispanic or Latino people of any race were 1.4% of the population.

There were 21,774 households, of which 22.9% had children under age 18 living with them, 32.2% were married couples living together, 13.7% had a female householder with no husband present, 4.6% had a male householder with no wife present, and 49.5% were non-families. 39.2% of all households were made up of individuals, and 12.5% had someone living alone who was 65 years of age or older. The average household size was 2.12 and the average family size was 2.83.

The median age was 35.4 years. 18% of residents were under age 18; 16.7% were 18 to 24; 25.8% were 25 to 44; 24.2% were 45 to 64; and 15.2% were 65 or older. The gender makeup of the city was 48.6% male and 51.4% female.

=== 2000 census ===
As of the 2000 census, there were 51,475 people, 22,955 households, and 12,235 families residing in the city. The population density was 3,234.1 inhabitants per square mile (1,248.7/km^{2}). There were 25,888 housing units at an average density of 1,626.5 inhabitants per square mile (628.0/km^{2}). The ethnic makeup of the city was 89.61% White, 7.49% Black or African American, 0.20% Native American, 0.82% Asian, 0.05% Pacific Islander, 0.30% from other races, and 1.53% from two or more races. Hispanic or Latino people of any race were 0.85% of the population.

There were 22,955 households, of which 20.6% had children under age 18 living with them, 36.9% were married couples living together, 13.1% had a female householder with no husband present, and 46.7% were non-families. 37.6% of all households were made up of individuals, and 15.1% had someone living alone who was 65 years of age or older. The average household size was 2.12 and the average family size was 2.80.

In the city the age distribution of the population shows 17.7% under age 18, 17.5% from 18 to 24, 24.9% from 25 to 44, 21.8% from 45 to 64, and 18.0% 65 years old or older. The median age was 37. For every 100 females, there were 88.7 males. For every 100 females age 18 and over, there were 85.8 males.

The median income for a household in the city was $23,234, and the median income for a family was $34,756. Males had a median income of $30,040 versus $21,198 for females. The per capita income for the city was $16,717. About 17.5% of families and 24.7% of the population were below the poverty line, including 29.8% of those under the age of 18 and 12.5% of those 65 and older.

== Economy ==
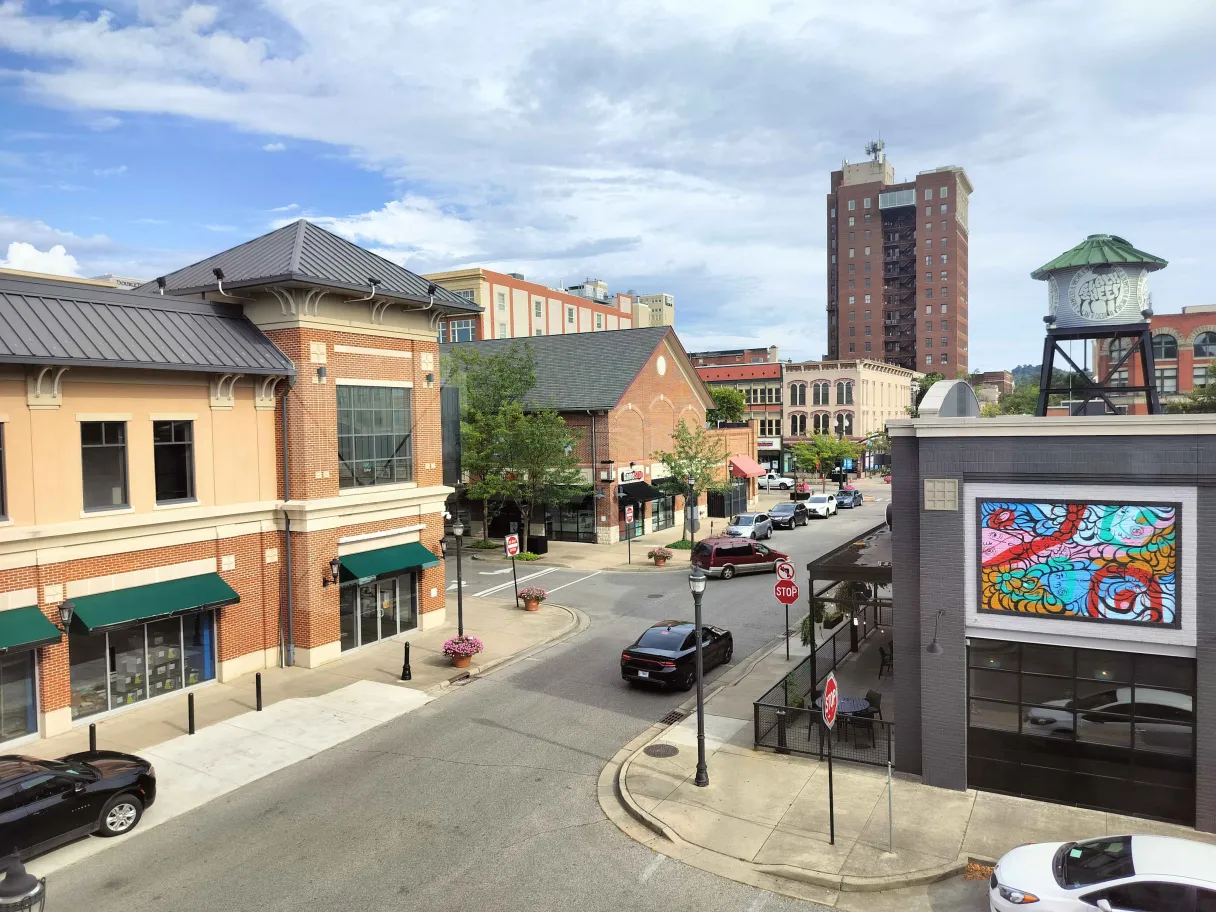
Skyway view of Pullman Square in 2024

The growth of Huntington and its economy was originally based on steel processing, shipping, manufacturing, and transportation through the 1970s. The city then experienced deindustrialization, which cost residents tens of thousands of low-skill, high-wage jobs. Huntington has since been adapting to the collapse of the region's steel industry. The primary industries have shifted to high technology, such as the film and television industries, health care, biomedical technology, finance, tourism, and the service sector.

Huntington has grown its economic base in recent years to include technology, retail, finance, education, and medical care (which constitutes the largest proportion of the city's employment). The largest employers are Marshall University, Cabell Huntington Hospital, St. Mary's Medical Center, Amazon, DirecTV, and the City of Huntington.

Area retail is anchored by the Huntington Mall, the largest mall in the state, and a healthy downtown retail sector including many boutique shops along the Old Main Corridor, Third Avenue, and Pullman Square.

The newest area of development is Kinetic Park, a premier technology park on Sixteenth Street, 1/4 mile north of Interstate 64. The flagship of the development is Amazon's new 70,000 sq ft (6,500 m^{2}). Customer Service Center, which opened in November 2011. Other developments in Kinetic Park followed.

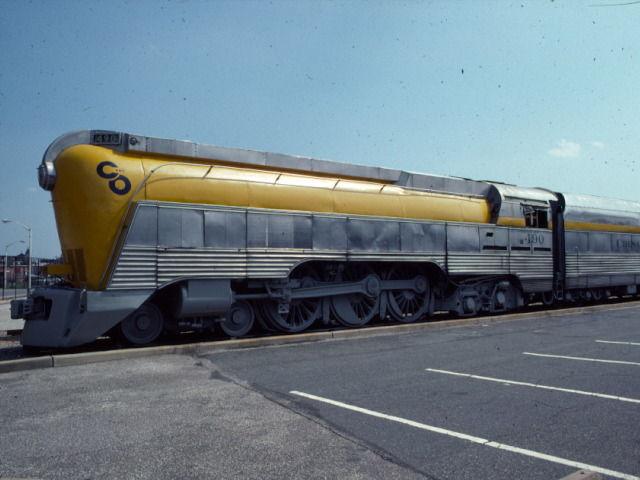
Huntington-built C&O class L 4-6-4 locomotive #490 displaying streamlining applied to several passenger train locomotives in the 1930s

The first large manufacturing business in Huntington was the Ensign Car Works, founded in Huntington in 1872 by Ely Ensign and William H. Barnum, who managed a car wheel manufacturing company, the Barnum and Richardson Company, in Connecticut. The company was incorporated on November 1, 1872. Financing was provided primarily by Barnum and Collis P. Huntington, who was one of the principals in the Central Pacific Railroad and founder of the City of Huntington.

For the first ten years of production, Ensign manufactured iron parts such as railroad car wheels. The company began building wooden freight cars in the early 1880s, selling a large portion of its inventory to the Chesapeake and Ohio, Southern Pacific and Central Pacific railroads, all of which were controlled by Huntington. In 1962, the Huntington ACF plant began building a revolutionary new design that quickly became the standard of the rail car industry. The car, known as the CenterFlow covered hopper car, was developed by ACF to transport huge volumes of lightweight, high-bulk commodities, such as plastic pellets. By 1992, ACF had manufactured more than 100,000 hopper cars. The sprawling ACF Industries rail car plant once had many as 1,600 employees with an annual payroll of $30 million. The buildings were demolished in 2024 with the exception of the plants machine shop which is being fully renovated to house the Marshall Advanced Manufacturing Center's Welding and Robotics Laboratory in a $6.5 million renovation scheduled to be completed in 2025. The remainder of the now cleared 19.7 acre lot is planned to be renovated into a mixed-use development space.

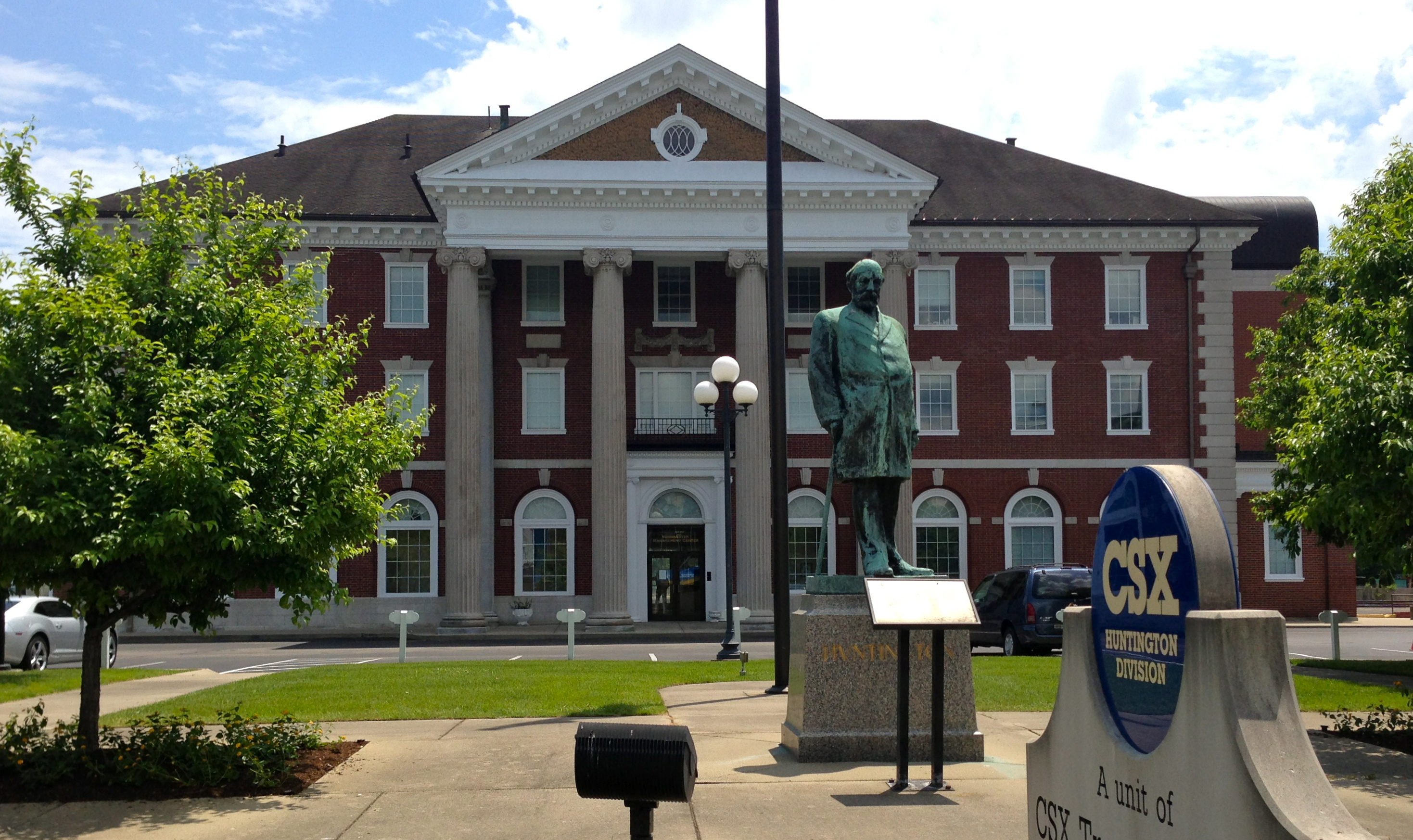
The former Chesapeake and Ohio Railway depot, now CSX Transportation's Huntington Division Headquarters, features a statue of Collis P. Huntington.

Since its founding as the western terminus of the C&O Railroad, Huntington has served as a major break of bulk point between rail traffic and the Ohio River/Mississippi River watershed. The Huntington Division is still the largest in the CSX Transportation network. A large portion of the division's revenue comes from hauling coal out of the coalfields of West Virginia and eastern Kentucky. Much of the coal is brought to the Port of Huntington-Tristate by train to be transported by river barges to industrial centers in other states.

Huntington is in the company's Southern Region and is the largest of ten operating divisions on the network. The division comprises the former railroads Chesapeake and Ohio (C&O); Baltimore and Ohio (B&O); Western Maryland (WM); Louisville and Nashville (L&N); and the Clinchfield. It serves the states of Kentucky, Tennessee, Virginia, West Virginia and Ohio. CSX's Huntington Division main office is in the historical former C&O passenger station downtown. The office is home to a regional office that is home to the divisions's top managers, a centralized yardmasters and train dispatchers center, a freight car light repair shop and a locomotive heavy repair facility in the city.

Huntington is also home to Heiner's Bakery. Founded in 1905, Heiner's employs nearly 500 people in its 130,000-square-foot (12,000 m^{2}) facility. The bakery was privately owned by the Heiner family and marketed exclusively under the "Heiner's" label until it was acquired by the Earthgrains division of Anheuser-Busch in 1994. Six months later, A-B spun off its bread business as the stand-alone Earthgrains Corporation. In 2000, Earthgrains merged with the Sara Lee Corporation. In 2011, Sara Lee sold its bread business, including the trademark Sara Lee, to the worldwide Grupo Bimbo, which is based in Mexico City. Today the bakery markets under the "Heiner's", "Earthgrains", "Sara Lee" and "Bimbo" brands.

Huntington is still a base for the metalworking and welding trades with the repair of railroad rolling stock, barges, and river boat equipment. Major fabricating firms—such as the Special Metals Corporation plant, Steel of West Virginia, Martin Steel, Huntington Plating, Richwood Industries, Evans Welding and Fabricating Co, and Hammers Industries—serve the railroads, river transportation, steelmaking, coal, oil, natural gas, electrical, windpower, biofuel, and other important industries.

== Culture ==
Huntington is within Appalachia. The 2006 Warner Bros. motion picture We Are Marshall, the 2010 ABC series Jamie Oliver's Food Revolution, the 2017 television series My Brother, My Brother and Me, and the Netflix documentary "Heroin(e)" were all filmed in the city.

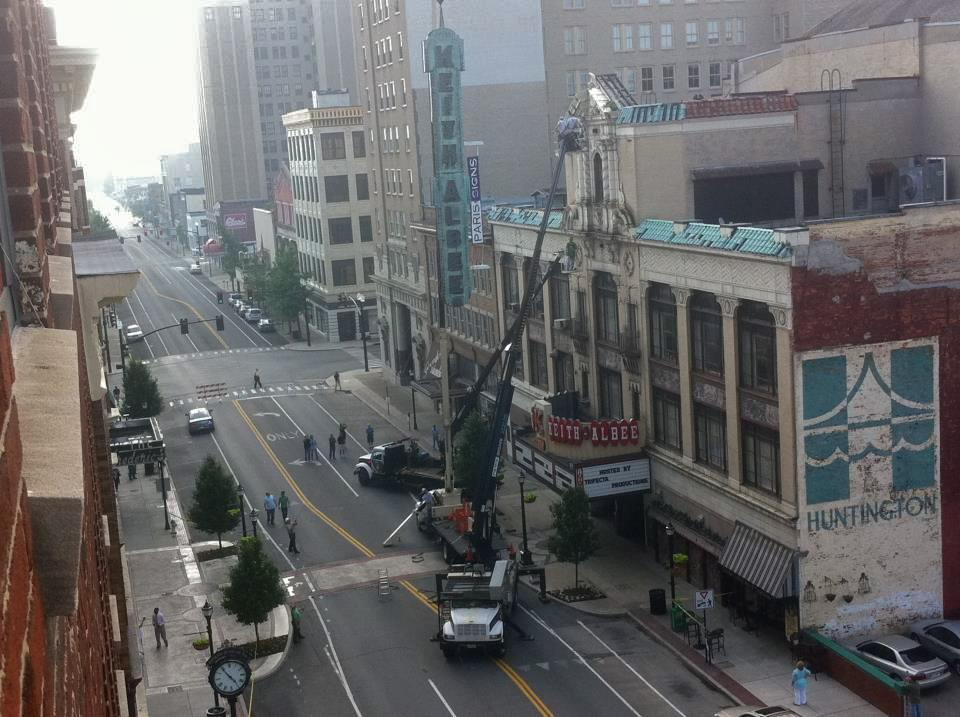
The Keith-Albee Performing Arts Center's sign being reinstalled over Fourth Avenue in the Downtown Historic District in 2012

Arguably, the most famous attraction in Huntington is Keith-Albee Theatre, a former Vaudeville palace in the "Art Deco" style from the 1920s and one of the architectural masterpieces of Downtown Huntington, on Fourth Avenue. Now known as the Keith Albee Performing Arts Center, the Keith was originally built in 1928 as the Keith-Albee Theatre, and under the supervision of vaudeville tycoons B. F. Keith and Edward Albee as part of their Keith-Albee vaudeville circuit, the Keith-Albee was the second-largest theater in the United States at that time, behind the Roxy in New York City. The theater was designed by Thomas W. Lamb who designed approximately 153 theaters around the world. Only forty-three of these grand theaters are still open, and seventy-one have been demolished. "The Keith" has been undergoing a full restoration since 2009. This included the restoration of the famous front sign in 2012. After standing over Fourth Avenue for decades and being featured in hundreds of pictures and postcards, two Hollywood movie premieres, and being struck by lightning numerous times; the sign had to be taken down in 2011. A massive "Save Our Sign" effort was organized to fund the full restoration of the sign, which was reinstalled in May 2012.

=== Museums ===
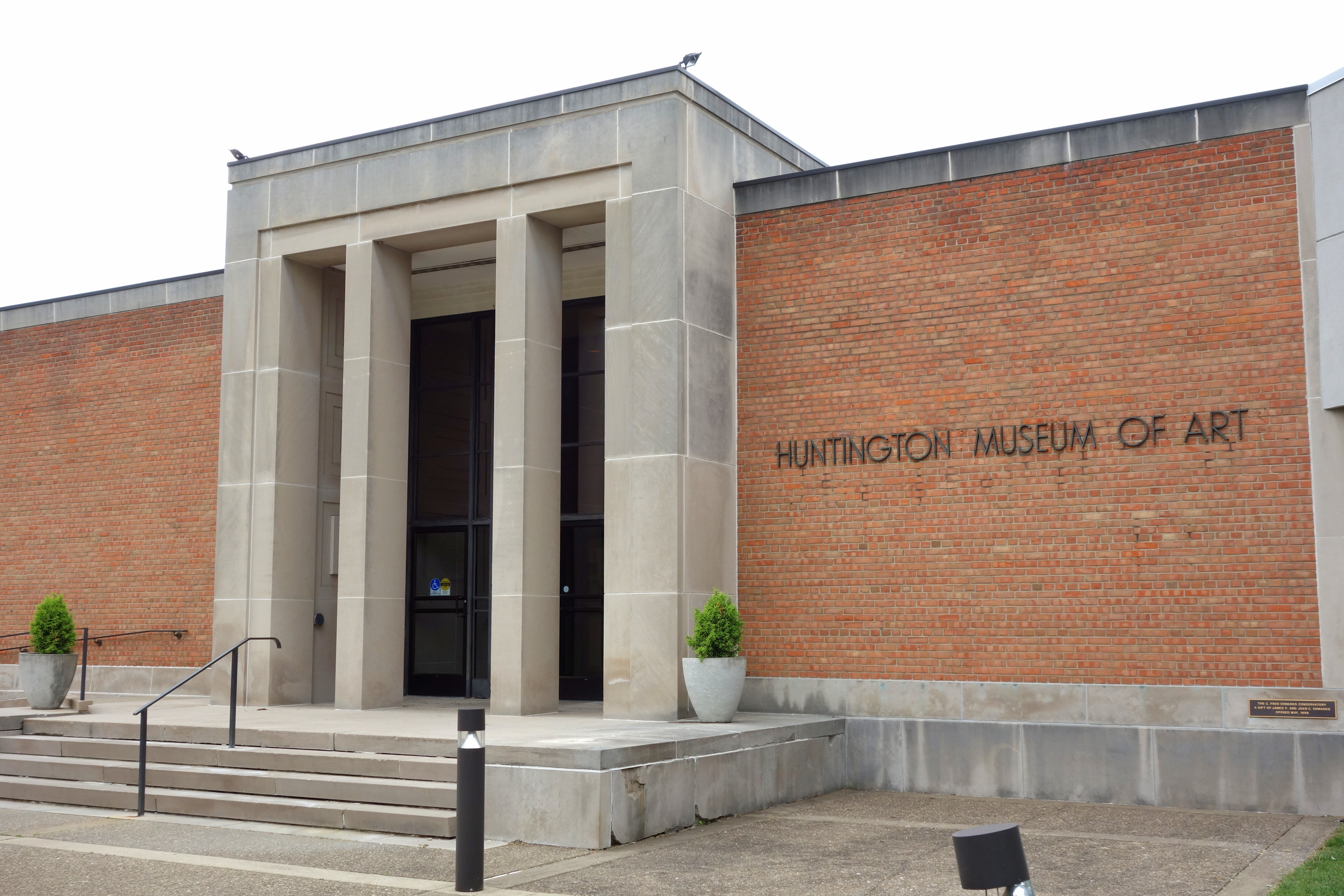
The Huntington Museum of Art in 2013

The Huntington Museum of Art, in the hills above Ritter Park, features numerous collections and exhibitions; it is also home to the C. Fred Edwards Conservatory.

The Huntington Children's Museum, located near Old Central City, features dozens of interactive activity exhibits. On the other side of Old Central City, sits Safety Town, a children activity museum built as a miniature town that focuses on road safety and transportation safety.

The Touma Museum of Medicine, named after Joseph B. Touma and Omayma Touma, medical physicians who served Huntington, opened after they donated their +2,800 medical artifacts to Marshall University to start the museum.

Heritage Farm Museum and Village is an open-air village and series of museums relating to Appalachian Culture and History from the 19th century onward. The Museum of Radio and Technology is near the west end of the park in a renovated elementary school. The Cabell County Courthouse and the Carnegie Library downtown also hold historical interest. One block south, 5th Avenue is noted for its many historic church buildings. The city is also the site of an Adena Native American burial mound, known as the Camden Park Mound.

Other museums include:

- Birke Art Gallery, as part of Marshall University
- Huntington Railroad Museum
- Museum of Radio and Technology
- Thomas Carroll House

=== Restaurants ===
Cam's Ham is a restaurant located along the rails of Huntington Station. Known as the Home of the Original Sugar-Flaked Ham, Cam's Ham was listed on the Food Network's 50 States 50 Sandwiches list as having the best sandwich in West Virginia.

In 2025, Nomada Bakery, located in the Heritage Station, was ranked as the top cake shop in the United States by USA Today.

=== Annual events and fairs ===
Huntington is home to numerous events and fairs throughout the year.

Name	Location	Date	Comments
Appalachian Film Festival	Huntington City Hall	Final Weekend in April	One of the largest film festivals in West Virginia showcasing Appalachian Culture.
Guyandotte Civil War Days	Guyandotte	Early-November	This festival features arts and crafts, food, and entertainment.
Guyandotte Heritage Days	Guyandotte	November	This historic-themed festival features reenactment of the Confederate raid and the Union reprisal. It features period music, museums, 'living histories', and craft displays.
Hilltop Festival	Huntington Museum of Art	2nd weekend in September	This event offers entertainment, children's activities, a petting zoo, book fair, arts and crafts, and concessions.
Huntington Music & Arts Festival	Ritter Park Amphitheater	Last Saturday in September	Festival centered around local and regional music and visual artists
Jazz-MU-Tazz	Marshall University	June	A summer jazz festival, it is a weekend of music that features jazz cabarets, outdoor concerts, and numerous activities.
Lions Tri-State Arts & Crafts Festival	Big Sandy Superstore Arena	1st weekend in December	An old-fashioned arts and crafts fair that includes over 200 exhibitors featuring a variety of arts and crafts and homemade foods and sweets.
Old Central City Days	Central City district in West Huntington	3rd weekend in June	This event offers numerous entertainment and shopping options in addition to the existing stock of storefronts, historic tours, and various food vendors at the new farmers market "depot".
Pilot Club of Huntington's Antique Show and Sale	Big Sandy Superstore Arena	Last complete weekend in September.	An antique show and sale that features more than 40 dealers representing more than 10 states and West Virginia.
Rails & Ales Festival	Harris Riverfront Park	Second Saturday in August	West Virginia's largest beer festival.
Ritter Park Days	Ritter Park	Weekends in July and August.	Features children-based activities and programs.
St. George Greek Festival	St. George Greek Orthodox Church 701 11th Ave	September 24–26, 2010	A festival with Greek food, music, and dancing.
Tri-State Comic Con	Marshall Health Network Arena	Spring time. Usually April.	The largest convention in the state. It is a comic-centered show with guest, independent creators, vendors, cosplayers and contest.
West Virginia Chilifest	Downtown district – 4th Avenue and Plaza	September 15–17	State championship is held every year, with chili cooks coming from West Virginia and other states to compete for a berth in the national competition.
West Virginia Hot Dog Festival	Pullman Square district – 3rd Avenue, downtown Huntington	Last Saturday in July	The WV Hot Dog Festival celebrates the unique variations of local/regional hot dogs

=== Camden Park ===
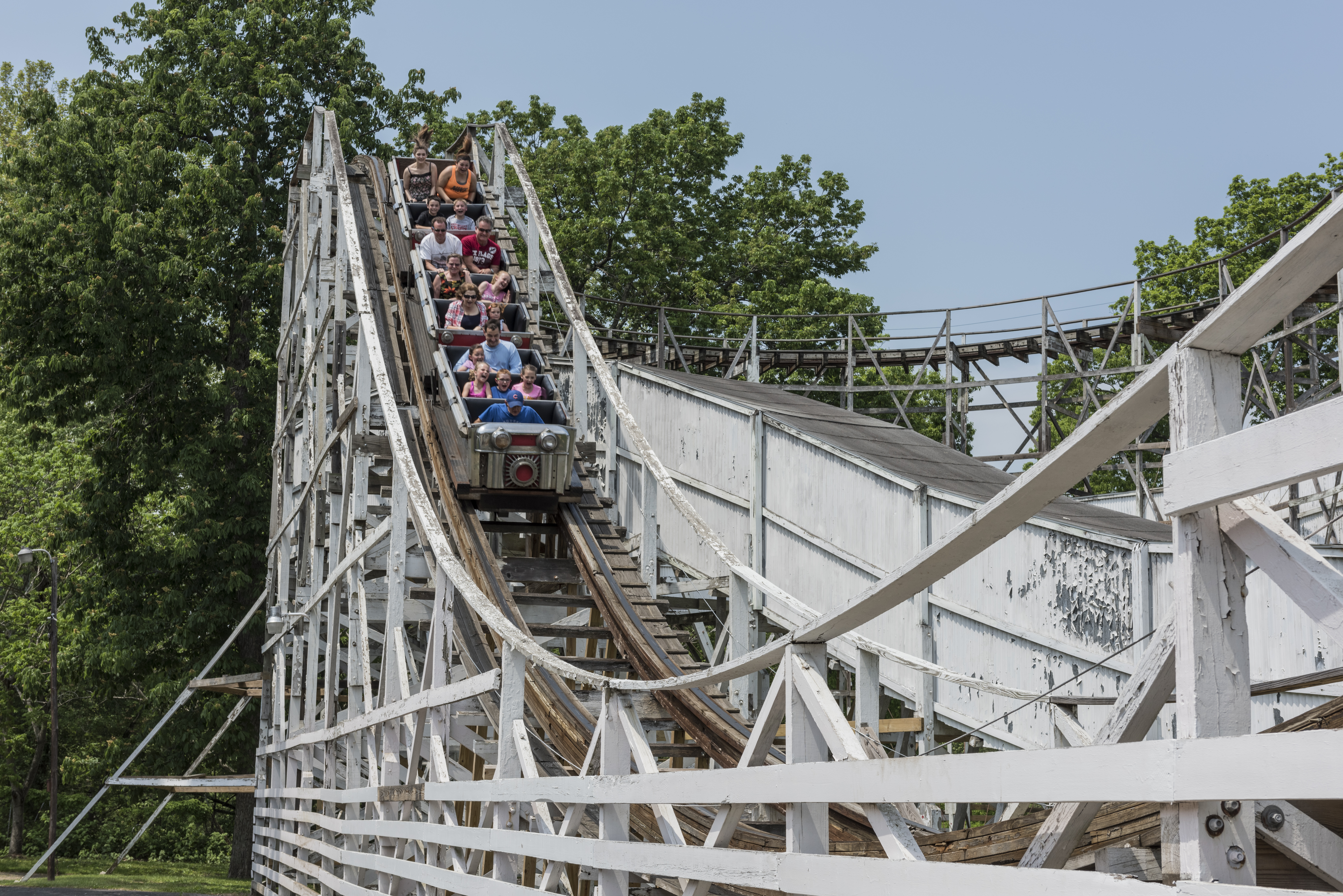
The Big Dipper at Camden Park

Camden Park is a 26-acre (110,000 m^{2}) amusement park near Huntington. It is a traditional park home to over 30 rides and attractions. The park features two of the three remaining roller coasters built by National Amusement Devices. The Big Dipper, a wooden roller coaster constructed in 1958, features the original Century Flyer cars complete with headlights and detail work. The coaster is classified as an ACE Coaster Classic by the American Coaster Enthusiasts. The park's second coaster, the Lil' Dipper was completed in 1961 and is also an ACE Coaster Classic. The park is also home to several entertainment events which take place throughout the year: Children's Festival, Hot Summer Nights Concert Series, Coca-Cola Days, and Halloween Spooktacular.

Camden Park was originally built in 1903 at the western terminus of the trolley line (then owned by the Camden Interstate Railway Company) to encourage ridership. Camden Park is now owned by the Boylin Family. This is the second generation of Boylins owning and operating West Virginia's only amusement park. J. P. Boylin transformed Camden Park from a carousel to an amusement park in 1950. By the late 19th century almost every large town in America had streetcars and many had parks to boost weekend and holiday traffic. Originally developed as a picnic area by the Camden Interstate Railway in 1903 Camden Park has survived into the 21st century as a thriving traditional amusement park. Over the years Camden Park has been the setting for baseball games, tens of thousands of picnics, fairs, marathon dances, roller derbies, flagpole sitting, a swimming pool, a zoo, plus numerous attractions and rides. Camden Park also is a playable location in the video game Fallout 76.

== Parks and recreation ==
Huntington is home to eleven public parks around the city, maintained by the Greater Huntington Park and Recreation District. The most frequented are Harris Riverfront Park downtown and Ritter Park on the South Side. Camden Park, an amusement park, is also adjacent to the city. Camden Park is West Virginia's only amusement park. The park has been open since 1903. Pullman Square features many restaurants and shops and a stage for live performances.

Huntington is a qualified Tree City USA as recognized by the National Arbor Day Foundation.

=== Ritter Park ===
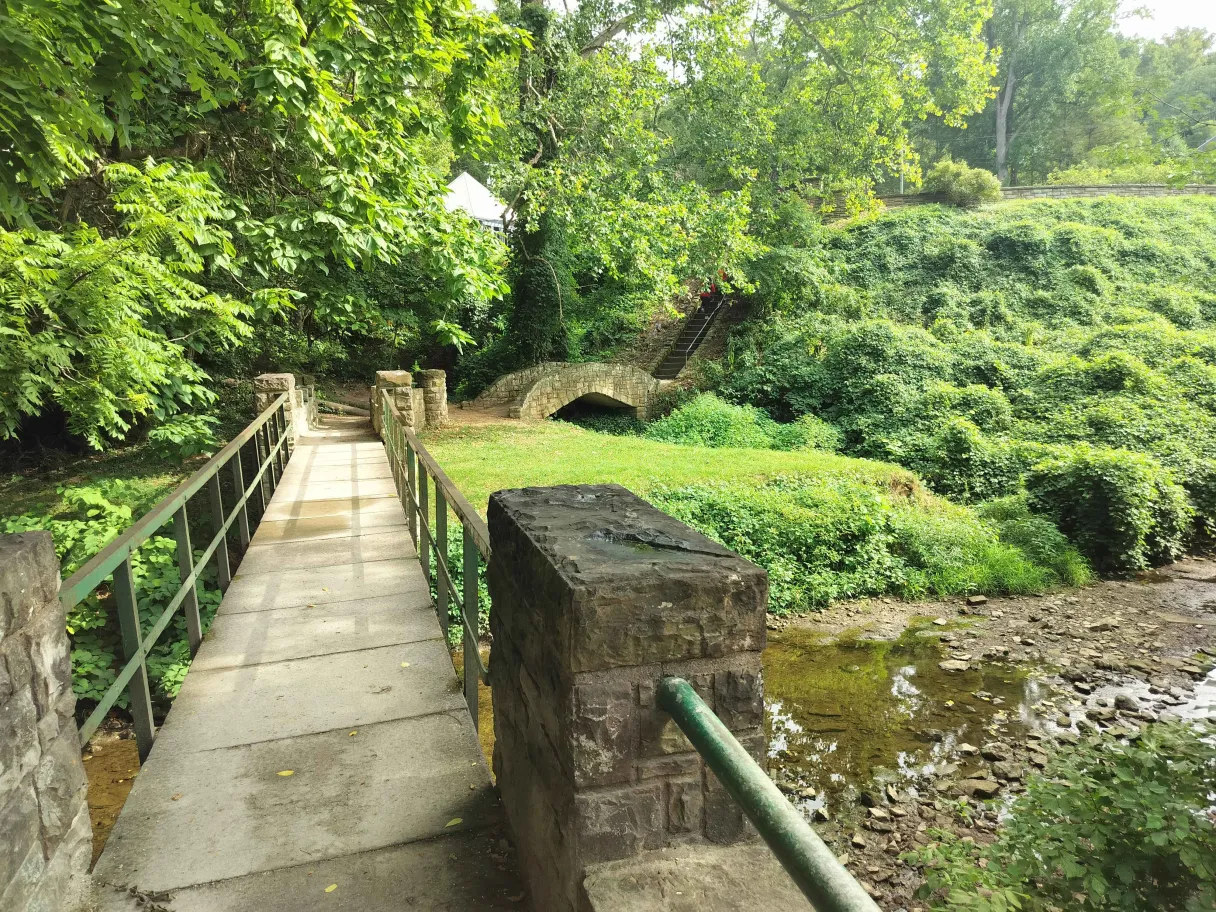
Path to the Ritter Park rose garden

The most prominent park within Huntington's public park system, Ritter Park was named for Charles L. Ritter who donated the site. It was created in 1913 by Rufus Switzer, a city council member. It consists of numerous lengthy walking and cycling trails along Four Pole Creek, which runs the entire length of the park and is crossed by many wooden and stone footbridges. There are also restroom facilities, picnic tables, a shelter, a children's playground, an amphitheater, a rose garden, and a dog park.

The park was officially opened in September 1913. Architect Gus Wofford was hired by the city to design the park and its amenities. His works continued till the 1930s and includes bridges that cross streams, tennis courts, greenhouse, and picnic facilities. It is in the Ritter Park Historic District, listed on the National Register of Historic Places in 1990.

The Rose Garden and the playground are among the amenities of Ritter Park that attract tourists. The Rose Garden, including the "Room with a View", is used for weddings and special occasions. The Rose Garden has more than 3,500 rose plants. The garden bordered by stone walls is designed to place benches for the events. In addition to the weddings, the annual Rose Show and the Summer Nature Programs are presented here. Each year the roses are tested and provided by the American Rose Society.

=== Other parks ===
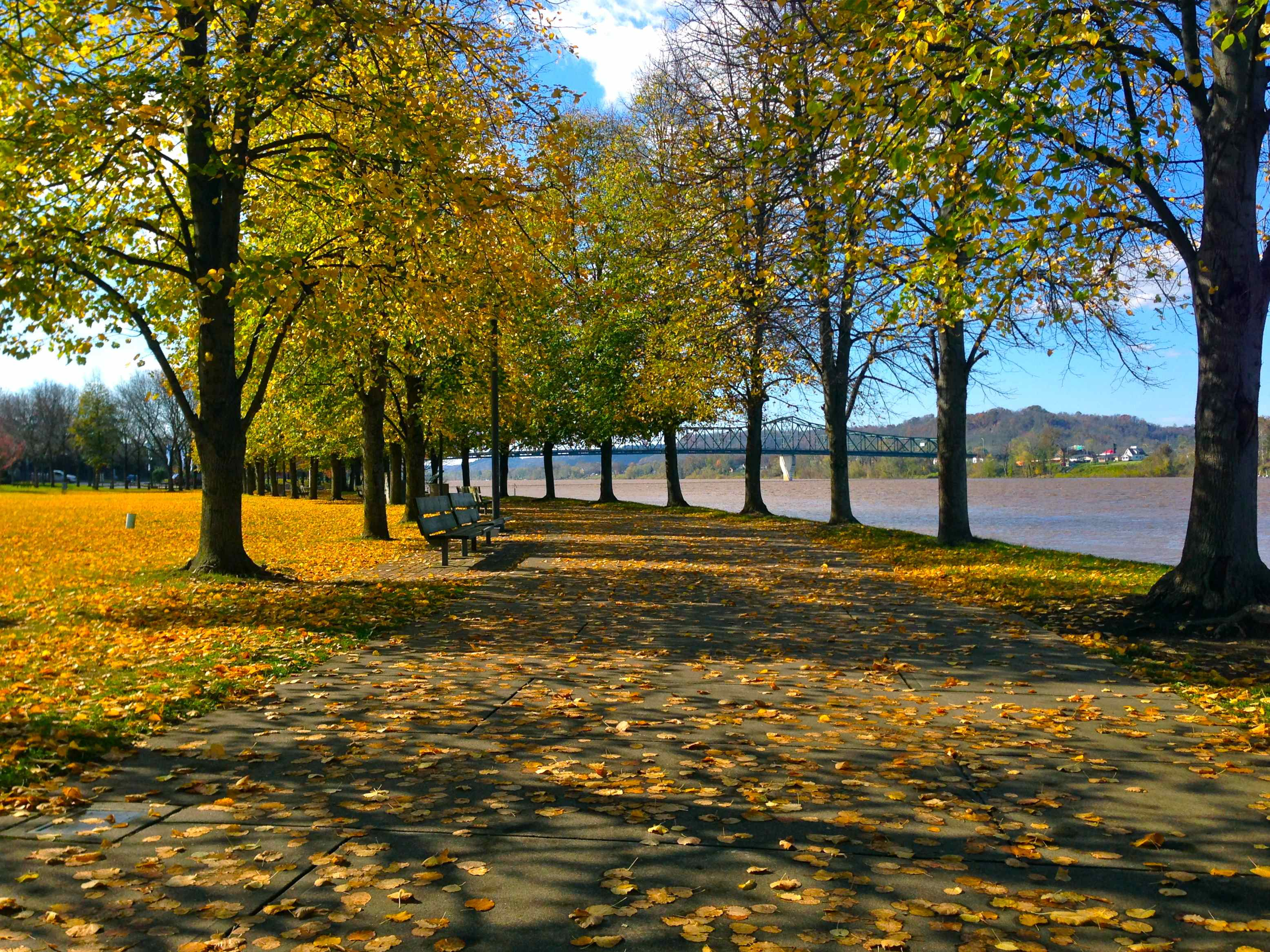
Harris Riverfront Park, with the Robert C. Byrd Bridge crossing the Ohio River in the background

Camp Mad Anthony Wayne is located on Spring Valley Drive. Named for "Mad" Anthony Wayne, it contains open grounds, hiking trails, a disc golf course, picnic tables, a campfire circle, and a lodge. The facility sleeps 28 and contains bathroom and shower facilities. It has two wood-fired fireplaces. Part of the park was listed on the National Register of Historic Places in 2002.

Harris Riverfront Park has seen renewed interest in recent years from local citizens, government, and businesses. It hosts concerts and music events, open-air movies, and is included in citywide construction of surveillance cameras providing free public-access wireless internet. The park is situated between the city flood wall and the Ohio River.

McClelland Park is located along the Ohio River near St. Mary's Hospital. It is named after James L. McClelland, former Greater Huntington Parks and Recreation District director. It features two tennis courts, a basketball court, playground, scenic swings, picnic areas, and a grill. It was formerly named 27th Street Park, named for the street it lies on.

Memorial Park on Memorial Boulevard contains a walking trail, a small playground, a picnic shelter, and a small restroom. The two-mile (3 km) walking trail merges with the one-mile (1.6 km) trail around the main Ritter Park at 8th Street & North Blvd. Huntington's Memorial Arch is a historic memorial arch in Memorial Park. It was built between 1924 and 1929 by the Cabell County War Memorial Association as a memorial to the dead and to those who served the county in World War I. It is built of gray Indiana limestone on a gray granite base. It is the only triumphal style arch in West Virginia. It formerly included a large swimming pool that was demolished in 2006. It was listed on the National Register of Historic Places in 1981.

== Sports ==
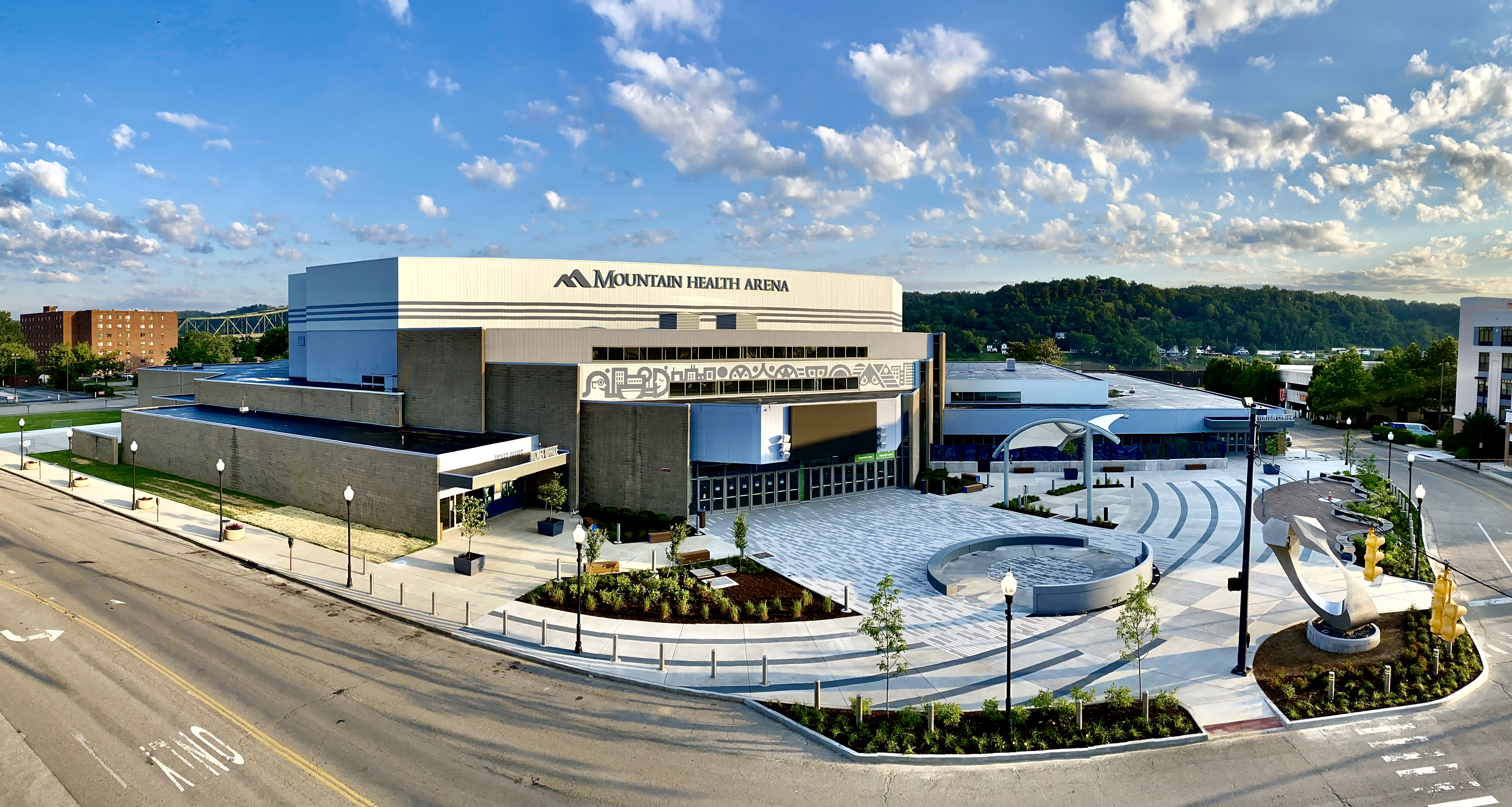
Marshall Health Network Arena

=== Professional sports ===
The Marshall Health Network Arena was formerly the home of the River Cities LocoMotives (2001) and the Huntington Hammer (2011–2012), both members of the Ultimate Indoor Football League, and the Huntington Heroes indoor football team in the American Indoor Football League (2006–2008).

Huntington has a long history of baseball clubs, starting with the Huntington Blue Sox (1911–1916). Other clubs include: the Huntington Boosters (1931–1933, 1937 & 1939), the Huntington Red Birds (1934–1936), the Huntington Bees (1938), the Huntington Aces (1940–1941), the Huntington Jewels (1942), and the Huntington Cubs (1990–1994). The Huntington Cubs played in the Appalachian League, and were affiliated with the Chicago Cubs. Their home stadium was at St. Cloud Commons. A new summer league club, Tri-State Coal Cats (2024–present), was announced on February 15, 2024. They are part of the Appalachian League and will share a home field with Marshall University baseball at the newly erected Jack Cook Field.

=== Collegiate ===
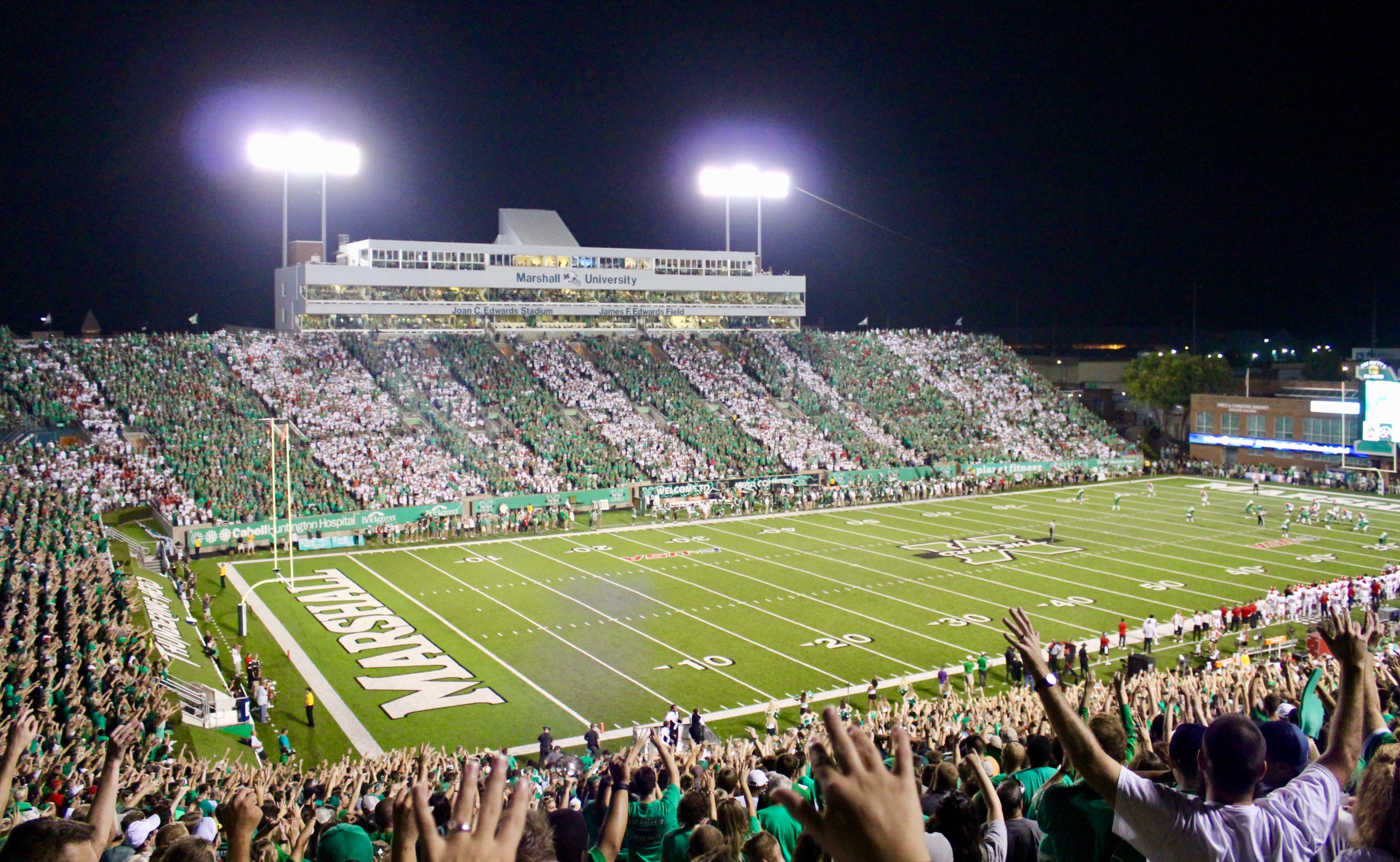
Joan C. Edwards Stadium, 2016

Marshall University's sports teams are known as the Marshall Thundering Herd. The school colors are kelly green and white. Marshall participates in FBS for football as a member of the Sun Belt Conference. The name Thundering Herd came from a Zane Grey novel released in 1925, and a silent movie of the same name two years later. Marshall teams were originally known as the Indians, and the green-white colors came in 1903, replacing black and blue. The Herald-Dispatch sports editor Carl "Duke" Ridgley tagged the team with the Thundering Herd name, but many other nicknames were suggested over the next thirty years, including Boogercats, Big Green, Green Gobblers, Rams, Judges, and others. In 1965, students, alums, and faculty settled on Thundering Herd in a vote, and Big Green was given to the athletic department's fund-raising wing.

Sports at the school include women's softball, swimming and diving, tennis, volleyball, and track and field; men's football, baseball; and teams for both genders in basketball, cross country, golf, and soccer. Marshall also fields club teams, not affiliated with the MU Athletic Department, in rugby union for both women and men, men's and women's lacrosse, and an equestrian team that competes in the Intercollegiate Horse Show Association.

From 1992 to 1996, Huntington hosted the NCAA Division I Football Championship at the Joan C. Edwards Stadium.

=== Other sports ===
Huntington was also home to the Huntington Stars (1939–1941), the Huntington Hornets (1956–1957), and the Huntington Blizzard (1993–2000) ice hockey teams. The Blizzard played at the Mountain Health Arena, the Hornets played at the Veterans Memorial Fieldhouse, and the Stars played at the former Iceland Arena. Marshall University has a club ice hockey team.

Huntington is home to the Jewel City Roller Girls, a women's roller derby team that was founded in 2010.

== Government and politics ==
Huntington City Hall, built in 1915

Since 1985 Huntington has operated under a strong mayor/city council form of government. The mayor is elected to four-year terms in partisan elections contested at the same time as United States presidential elections. The current mayor is former Marshall University Board of Governors member Patrick Farrell, a Republican who is currently serving his first term.

The city also serves as the county seat of Cabell County. The Cabell County Courthouse is on a downtown parcel that covers an entire city block. Within the building are the offices for all of the county's elected officials and their employees, including the sheriff, county commissioners, county clerk, magistrates, and Circuit Court judges.

Huntington's city council members are elected to four-year terms at the same time as the mayor. There are eleven members of the council, nine of whom represent single-member districts, while the other two are elected at large. The city council has the authority to draft and debate ordinances and can override a mayoral veto with a two-thirds majority. As of February 2025, there are six Democrats and five Republicans on the city council.

District	City Council	District	City Council
District 1	Jason Arthur (R)	District 7	Mike Shockley (D)
District 2	Todd Sweeney (R)	District 8	Linda Blough (R)
District 3	Tia "Fix" Rumbaugh (D)	District 9	Stacy Jo Holley (R)
District 4	Sarah Walling (D)	At Large	Ally Layman (D)
District 5	Teresa Johnson (D)	At Large	Rob Archer (R)
District 6	Holly Smith Mount (D)		

List of mayors of Huntington, West Virginia
- Peter Cline Buffington, 1871–1874
- Albert H. Woodworth, 1886–1887
- Edward S. Buffington, circa 1879
- Ely Ensign, 1896
- William F. Hite, circa 1897
- John Walton Ensign, circa 1906
- Floyd Sanford Chapman, circa 1912
- Edmund Sehon, circa 1915–1917
- E. N. Miller, circa 1917
- Charles William Campbell, 1919–1922
- Will E. Neal, 1925–1928
- J. Boyce Taylor, circa 1930
- Bobby Nelson, 1985-1993 (1st under "Strong Mayor / City Council" format)
- Jean Dean, 1993-2000
- David Felinton, 2001–2008
- Kim Wolfe, 2009–2012
- Stephen T. Williams, 2013-2025
- Patrick Farrell, 2025–present

== Media ==
=== Print ===
Huntington has one of West Virginia's largest daily circulating newspapers, The Herald-Dispatch, with an average weekday circulation of just over 25,000. The paper is locally owned by HD Media Co. LLC. Huntingtonnews.net has been online since 2000 and is a local Independent news source owned by Matthew Pinson.

The Parthenon, Marshall University's independent student newspaper, has a weekly print circulation of 6,000 and is distributed around Marshall's campus.

=== TV ===
Note - all stations listed serve both Huntington and Charleston, as both cities comprise a single TV market

Call sign	Channel	Affiliations
WSAZ-TV	3	NBC / MyNetworkTV on DT2
WCHS-TV	8	ABC / Fox on DT2
WVAH	11	Roar
WOWK	13	CBS
WLPX	29	Ion Television
WQCW	30	The CW
WVPB	33	PBS
WTSF	61	Daystar

=== Radio ===
Note: These are the only stations that are licensed to the city of Huntington.

Call sign	Frequency	Format	Description / Notes
WMUL	88.1 FM	College radio	This is operated by Marshall University.
WVPB	89.9 FM	NPR	West Virginia Public Radio
WCMI-FM	92.7 FM	Active rock 92.7 FM and 98.5 FM, The Planet "The Real Rock Station",	Kindred Communications, Huntington, West Virginia
WCMI-AM		ESPN 1340 AM, WCMI-AM,	Kindred Communications, Catlettsburg, Kentucky
WDGG	93.7 FM	Country	Kindred Communications, Huntington, West Virginia
WBVB	97.1 FM	Greatest Hits	Clear Channel Communications, B97.1 "The Tri-State's Greatest Hits"
WMGA	97.9 FM	Hot AC	Kindred Communications; Huntington, West Virginia
WKEE	100.5 FM	Top 40	Clear Channel Communications; Huntington, "100.5 KEE-FM"
WXBW	101.5 FM	Classic country	Kindred Communications; Gallipolis, Ohio (repeater WXVW-FM1 licensed to Huntington, West Virginia) "Big Buck Country 101.5"
WTCR-FM	103.3 FM	Country	Clear Channel Communications; WZWB 1420/FOX Sports is licensed to Kenova, West Virginia
WKLC	105.1 FM	Rock	Rock 105 "Everything That Rocks."
WAMX-FM	106.3 FM	Rock	1063 The Brew "Huntington's Only Classic Rock Station."
WEMM-FM	107.9 FM	Southern gospel	Southern gospel/teaching "Gospel 107.9"
WVHU	800 AM	News/Talk	News Talk 800 & 1600 (simulcast)
WRVC (AM)	930 AM/94.1 FM	ESPN Talk (10 a.m-12 p.m.)	Kindred Communications, Huntington, West Virginia.
WNRJ	1200 AM	Southern gospel	Southern gospel and patriotic music

== Education ==
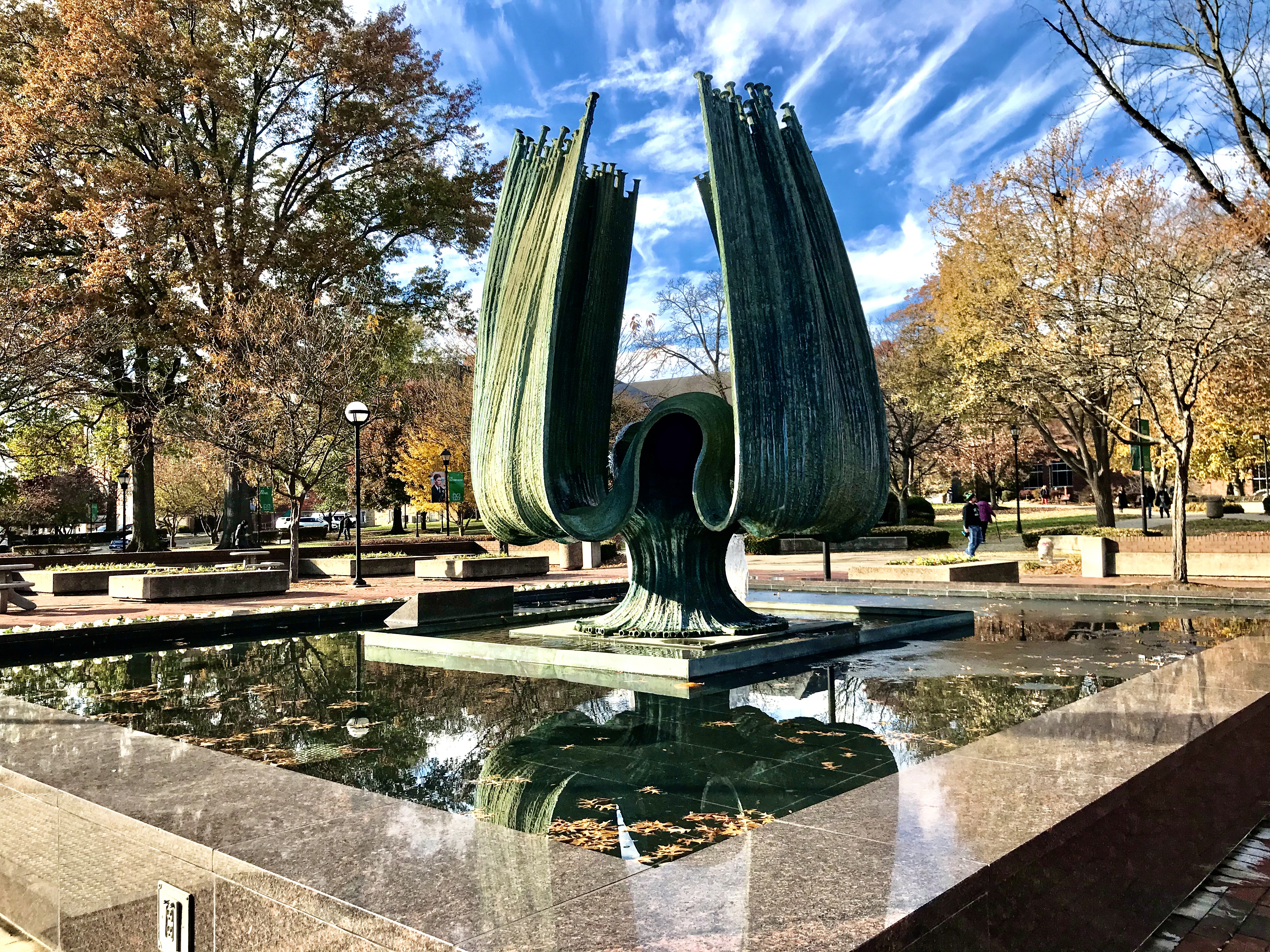
Marshall University Memorial Fountain

=== Primary and secondary ===
The residents of Huntington are served by the Cabell County Schools and Wayne County School System, which include Huntington High School, Cabell Midland High School, Spring Valley High School, Cabell County Career Technology Center, five middle schools, and 19 elementary schools. Private schools include the St. Joseph Catholic School (a regionally accredited, parochial school), Grace Christian School (a regionally accredited, evangelical school), and Covenant School.

=== Postsecondary education ===
Marshall University is a public research university in Huntington. It was founded in 1837 and is named after John Marshall, the fourth Chief Justice of the United States Supreme Court. The university is composed of eight undergraduate and graduate colleges and schools. At the time of Huntington's founding, Holderby's Landing was already the home of Marshall College State Normal School, founded as a private subscription school by residents of Guyandotte and the surrounding area. Local attorney John Laidley hosted the meeting which led to the founding of Marshall Academy, named after Laidley's friend, John Marshall.

Marshall's sports teams are known as the Marshall Thundering Herd, a name deriving from a Zane Grey novel released in 1925. The home field for the football program is James F. Edwards Field at the Joan C. Edwards Stadium. Basketball is played at the Cam Henderson Center. Soccer is played at Veterans Memorial Soccer Stadium. Marshall participates in NCAA Division I FBS as a member of the Sun Belt Conference. On November 14, 1970, Southern Airways Flight 932 jet transporting 75 Marshall University football players, coaches, staff, and supporters crashed just short of the Tri-State Airport in adjoining Ceredo, West Virginia, resulting in the death of all passengers. The crash has been described as "the worst sports-related air tragedy in U.S. history".

Other postsecondary education institutions in Huntington include the Robert C. Byrd Institute for Advanced Manufacturing, Mountwest Community & Technical College, the Huntington Junior College, St. Mary's Medical Center's School of Medical Imaging, School of Nursing, and School of Respiratory Care, as well as the Tri-State Institute of Pharmaceutical Sciences.

== Transportation ==
East Huntington Bridge

=== Highways ===
The primary roadways of Huntington include one major Interstate, Interstate 64 (I-64); two U.S. Highways, U.S. Route 60 (US 60) and US 52; six state routes; and numerous major thoroughfares. Huntington utilizes a grid-like street pattern featuring several wide boulevard-style avenues that run east and west. Most notable of these are Third and Fifth avenues. The city has a numbered street naming system, with avenues running east and west (parallel to the Ohio River) and streets running north and south.

- I-64, which skirts the South Hills with four interchanges that serve the city: US 52 (West Huntington Expressway), WV 152/WV 527, WV 10, and US 60. Exits 6 through 15 service the City of Huntington. US 52 is at exit 6.
- I-73 and I-74 are programmed to run concurrently with US 52 throughout western West Virginia. It is slated to use the Tolsia Highway near Kenova and the West Huntington Expressway near West Huntington's Old Central City neighborhood.
- US 60 is part of the historic Midland Trail that enters the city coming from Barboursville in the east at exit 11 off I-64. US 60 heads toward downtown, splitting into the 3rd and 5th avenues, just west of the WV 2 terminus. US 60 parallels the Ohio River through downtown, and merges into a four-lane undivided highway after crossing under the West Huntington Expressway (US 52) in the West End. US 60 exits the city in the west near the Camden Park.
- US 52 (West Huntington Expressway) is a four-lane expressway that enters Huntington from Ohio via the West Huntington Bridge from Chesapeake, Ohio, in the north, and heads south crossing US 60 in the West End. US 52 then turns west, overlapping I-64 beginning at exit 6, just south of Huntington city limits. US 52 and I-64 stay concurrent for 5 miles (8.0 km) in an easterly direction until reaching Exit 1, signed as the Kenova-Ceredo exit. Along with West Virginia Route 75, US 52 heads south from the intersection, paralleling the Big Sandy River and US 23, which parallels the river on the Kentucky side of the river. From one mile (1.6 km) south of Kenova, it is known as the Tolsia Highway for many miles through Wayne County.
- West Virginia Route 2 (WV 2) has its southern terminus just north of Huntington at US 60. WV 2, which parallels the entirety of West Virginia's section of the Ohio River, facilitates much traffic towards Point Pleasant and Parkersburg.
- WV 10 follows the Guyandotte River for much of its length and connects Huntington to Princeton. It enters the city south of I-64 at Hal Greer Boulevard. North of I-64 the highway is known as 16th Street. The highway's northern terminus is in downtown just south of the Ohio River at US 60, near Marshall University.
- WV 101 is an unsigned highway which runs for less than a mile, connecting Third Avenue (US 60) with Rotary Park. Until 1990, this was an alignment of US 60.
- WV 106 enters the Huntington neighborhood of Guyandotte, via the East End Bridge from Proctorville. The highway crosses WV 2, and immediately terminates at US 60, across the 3rd and 5th avenue split.
- WV 152's northern terminus is just shy of the city at I-64. Continuing north, it changes to WV 527.
- WV 527 crosses south into Huntington from Chesapeake, Ohio, via the Robert C. Byrd Bridge. WV 527 then travels through downtown as 5th Street and exits the city at I-64, which serves as the highway's southern terminus. Continuing south will lead into WV 152.

=== Bridges ===
Robert C. Byrd Bridge

The city has connections over the Ohio River to Proctorville, Ohio, via the East Huntington Bridge, and to Chesapeake, Ohio, via the Robert C. Byrd Bridge and the West Huntington Bridge.

The Robert C. Byrd Bridge is a 720-foot (220 m) continuous truss automobile bridge that crosses the Ohio River between Huntington and Chesapeake, Ohio. It was named after United States Senator Robert C. Byrd, who is credited with obtaining the funding for the project that was completed on November 6, 1994, at a cost of $32.6 million.

The previous bridge, known as the 6th Street Bridge, opened in 1926 and was Huntington's first bridge across the Ohio River. Designed in a gothic style, complete with four two-ton spires that rested on top of each peak. The spires were saved; one is currently on display outside of the Chesapeake city hall at the intersection of State Route 7 (SR 7) and the Robert C. Byrd Bridge. Two others are installed along 9th Street between 3rd and 5th Avenues.

The East Huntington Bridge (officially the "Frank Gatski Memorial Bridge", also called the "East End Bridge" or the "31st Street Bridge") is a 900-foot (270 m) cable-stayed bridge crossing the Ohio River at Huntington. It carries WV 106 on the West Virginia approach and SR 775 on the Ohio approach. Work began on the bridge in 1983 and was completed in August 1985 at a cost of $38 million. The bridge was renamed for Marshall University's first member of the Pro Football Hall of Fame, Frank "Gunner" Gatski, during halftime of the Marshall-UTEP Football game on November 18, 2006.

=== Rail ===
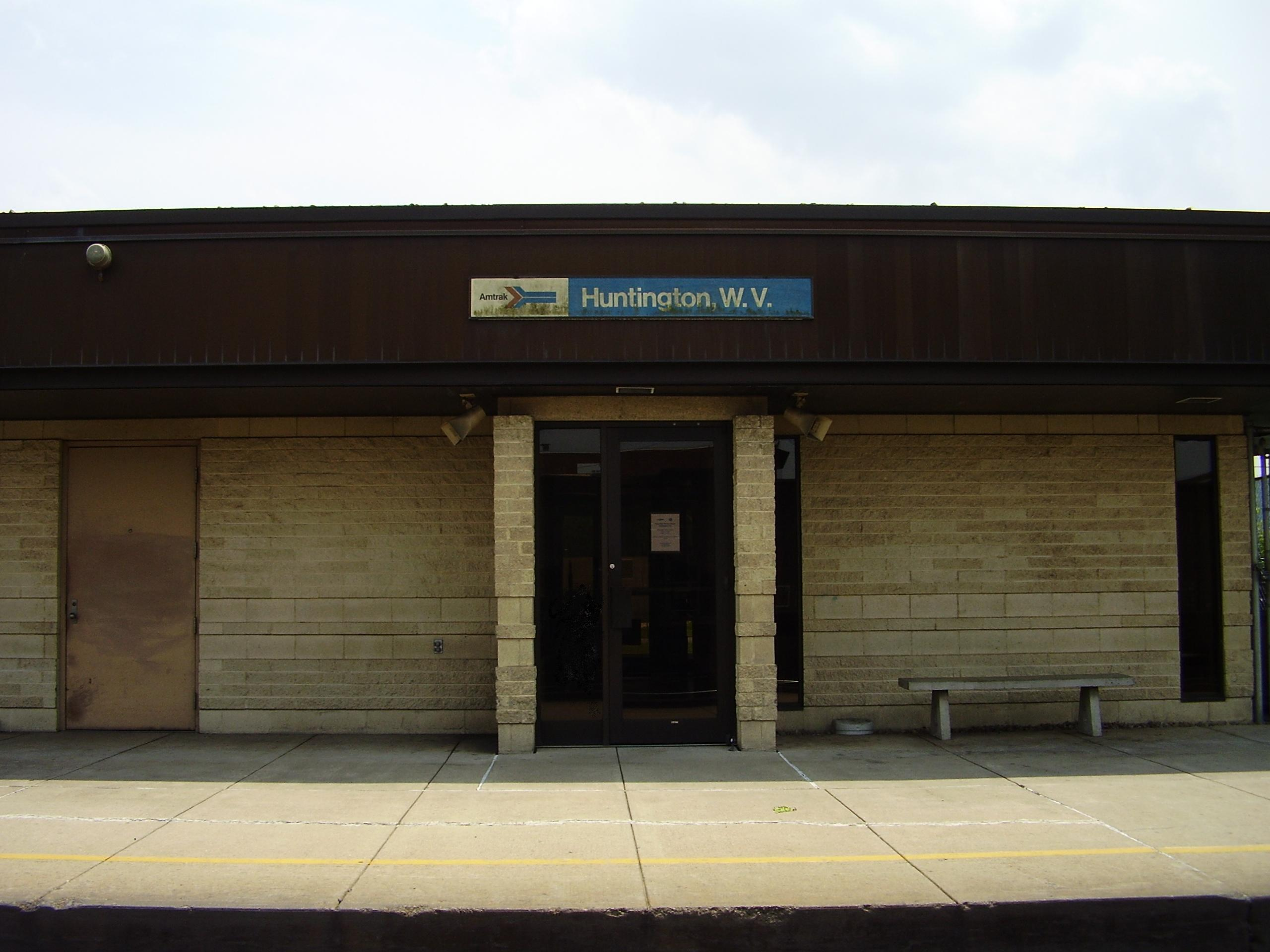
The platform of the Huntington Amtrak station

Since its founding as the western terminus of the C&O Railroad, Huntington has served as a major break of bulk point between rail traffic and the Ohio River/Mississippi River watershed. The Huntington Division is still the largest in the CSX Transportation network. A large portion of the division's revenue comes from hauling coal out of the coalfields of West Virginia and Eastern Kentucky. Much of the coal is brought to the Port of Huntington-Tristate by train to be transported by river barges to industrial centers in other parts of the United States.

Huntington is in the company's Southern Region and is the largest of ten operating divisions on the network. The division comprises the former railroads Chesapeake and Ohio (C&O); Baltimore and Ohio (B&O); Western Maryland (WM); Louisville and Nashville (L&N); and the Clinchfield. It serves the states of Kentucky, Tennessee, Virginia, West Virginia, and Ohio. CSX's Huntington Division main office is in the historical former C&O passenger station in downtown Huntington. The building is home to the division's top managers, a centralized yardmasters and train dispatchers center, a freight car light repair shop, and a locomotive heavy repair facility in the city.

The city was once a major hub for passenger rail service, but it now accounts for a significantly smaller portion of rail traffic than in the early decades of the 20th century. The Amtrak station is on the Cardinal line running three days a week between New York City and Chicago.

=== Public transit ===
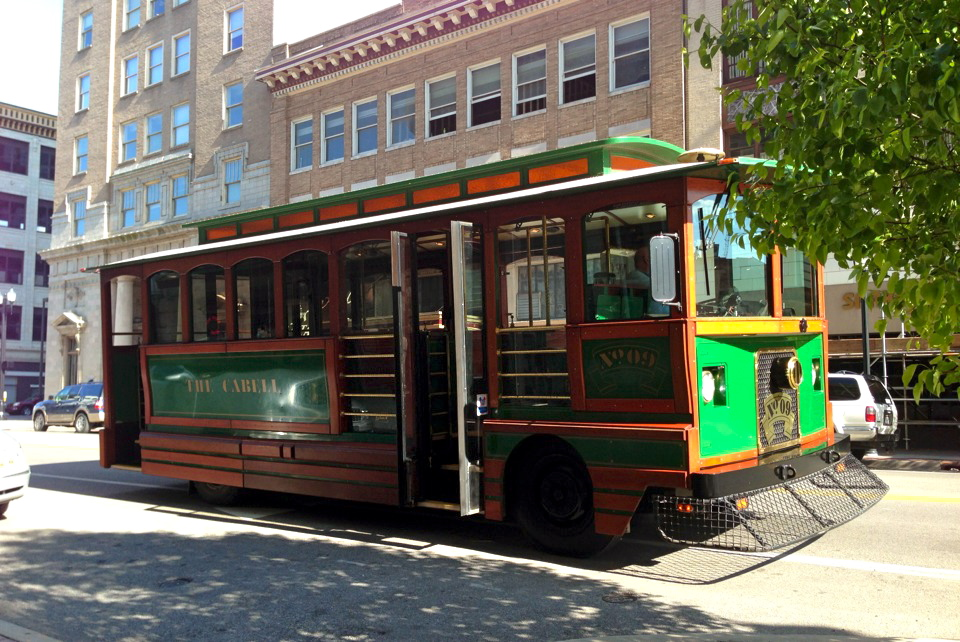
Trolley bus No. 9 on Fourth Avenue

TTA provides fixed-route bus service throughout Huntington and the surrounding area. Its buses range, on the West Virginia side from 19th Street West in Huntington to Milton, West Virginia, about 20 miles (32 km) to the east. On the Ohio side, the buses range from downtown Ironton to the Huntington suburb of Proctorville, Ohio, which is also a range of about 20 miles (32 km). Interchange buses provide links between Huntington and Chesapeake, Ohio, and between Ironton and Ashland, Kentucky, where transfers are available to the Ashland Bus System. However the system does not interchange between the TTA and the City of Ashland Bus Service in Ceredo, West Virginia.

The TTA also was involved in a joint venture with the Charleston-based Kanawha Valley Regional Transportation Authority bus system called Intelligent Transit which linked downtown Huntington to Charleston via bus. All bus routes began and ended at the old Greyhound Bus Depot in downtown Huntington, which is now known as the TTA Center. The service from Huntington to Charleston ceased in 2015. TTA bus services operate on Monday to Saturday between 6:00 a.m. and 11:15 p.m.

=== River ===
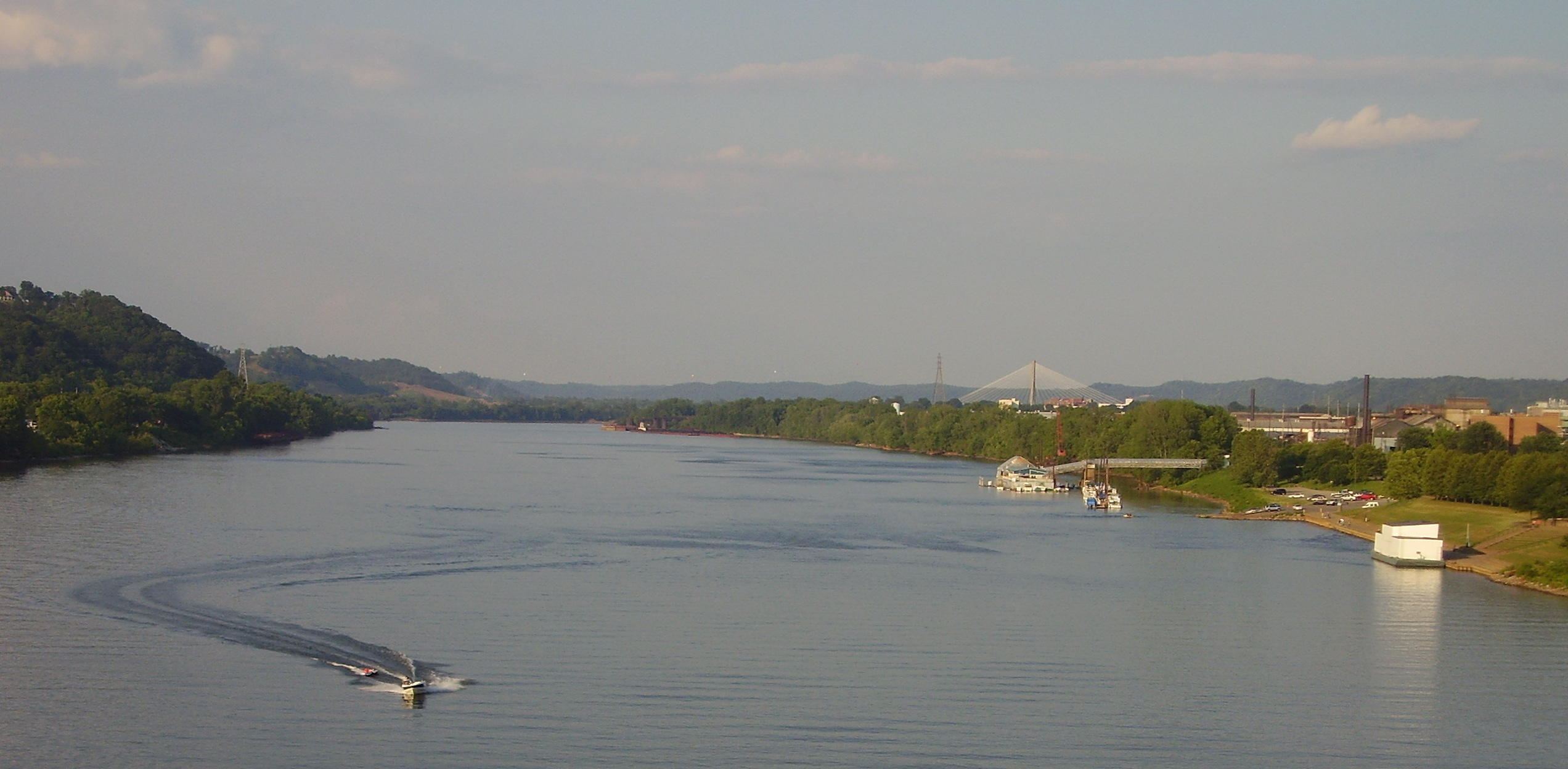
The Ohio River looking upstream from the Robert C. Byrd Bridge

The Port of Huntington-Tristate is the largest inland port in the United States in terms of total tonnage and ton-miles. This is due in large part to the coal traffic from the railroads and the petroleum products produced by the Marathon Petroleum oil refinery in nearby Catlettsburg, Kentucky, that use the Port of Huntington/Tri-State to load their products onto barges.

=== Air ===
The public Tri-State Airport, southwest of the city, has two runways. Commercial air service is provided by Allegiant Air and American Eagle. Huntington also holds the privately owned airport Robert Newlon Field, which serves the Huntington–Ashland metropolitan area.

== Infrastructure ==
=== Emergency services ===
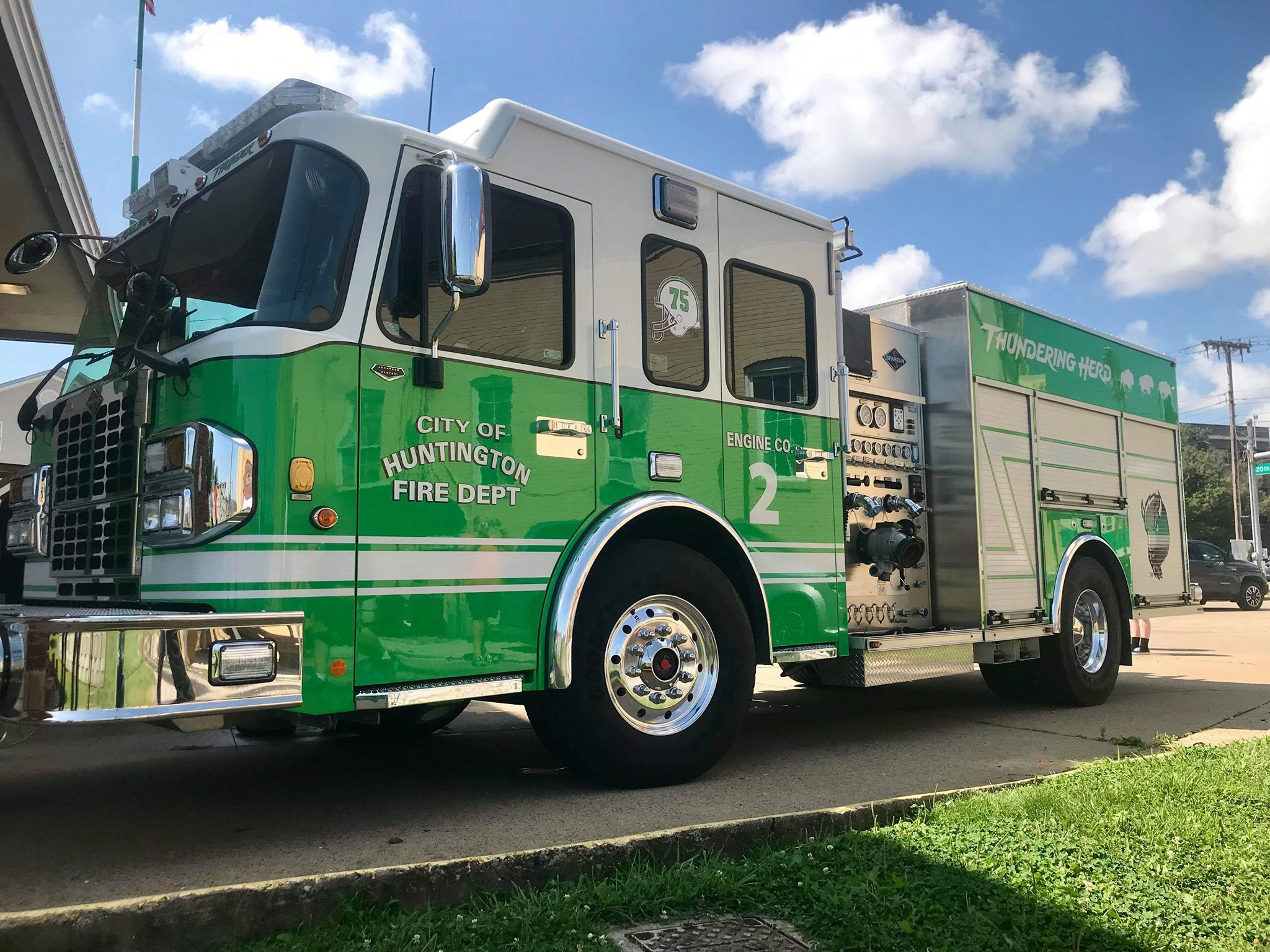
Huntington Fire Department Engine No. 2 painted in Marshall University markings

The Huntington Police Department is the primary law enforcement agency serving Huntington, tracing its history to 1872. The police department is staffed with approximately 100 officers.

Law enforcement and security for Marshall University is provided by the Marshall University Police Department. This protection includes the main campus area (including the streets on or immediately surrounding campus) as well as all other university-owned or managed buildings and property, including the Marshall University Medical Center at Cabell Huntington Hospital. In addition to both municipal and county law enforcement agencies, Huntington is also home to a detachment of the West Virginia State Police.

The city of Huntington is protected by approximately 100 professional firefighters of the Huntington Fire Department, founded in 1897. As of 2024, the department has six fire stations throughout the city. The six stations consist of six engine companies, two ladder trucks, a rescue truck, a marine unit, and several reserve engines, reserve utility trucks, and staff vehicles.

=== Healthcare ===
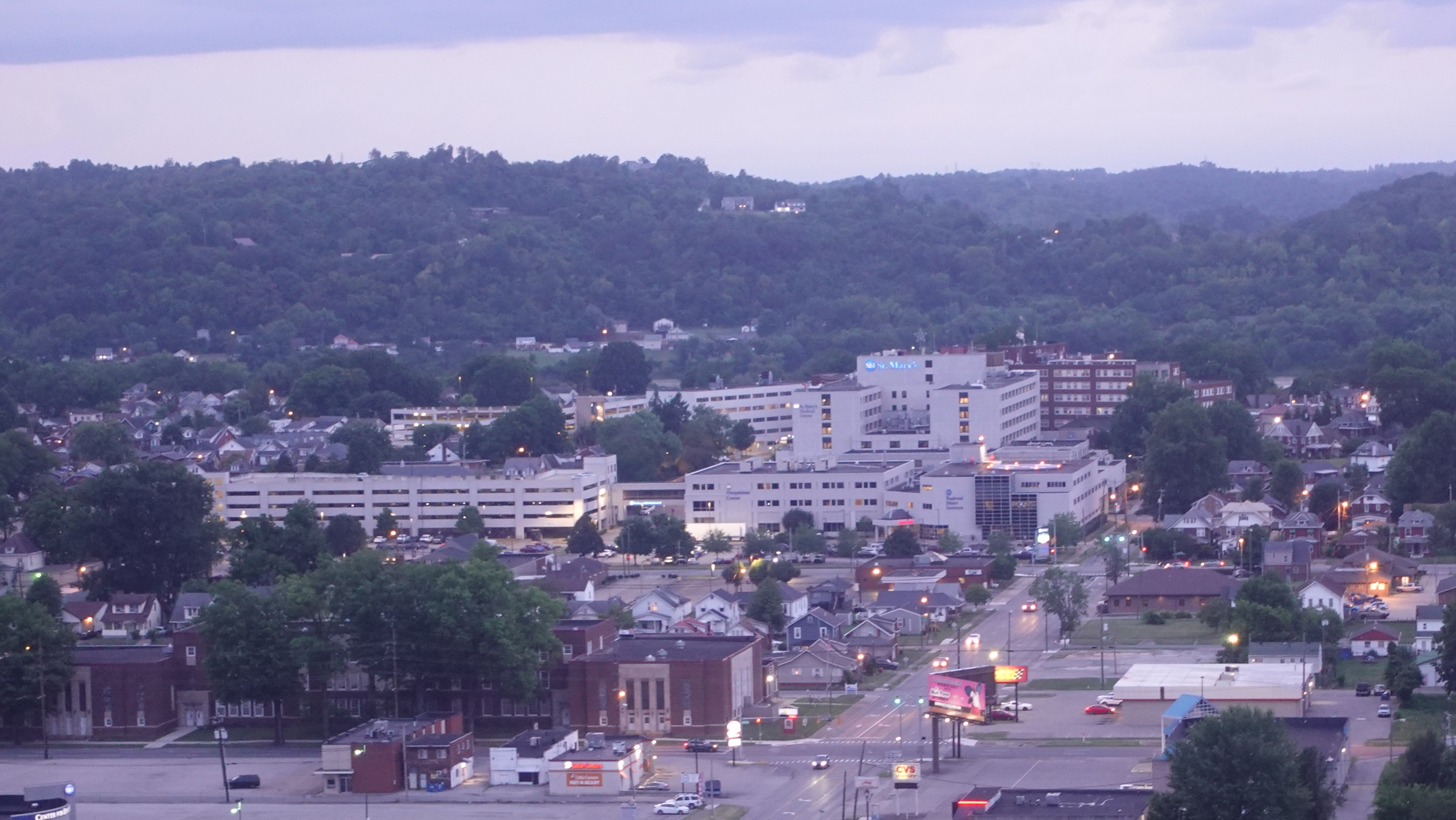
St. Mary's Medical Center from Rotary Park View

The two largest hospitals in Huntington are St. Mary's Medical Center and Cabell Huntington Hospital. St. Mary's and Cabell Huntington, both owned and operated by Mountain Health Network, are jointly designated as the only trauma center in the region. St. Mary's is the largest medical facility in Huntington and the second largest in the tri-state region at 393 beds. The medical center is the largest private employer in Cabell County with over 2,600 employees. As a teaching facility associated with the Marshall University Joan C. Edwards School of Medicine, St. Mary's trains medical residents in several specialties. The hospital campus is home to the St. Mary's School of Nursing, the St. Mary's School of Radiologic Technology, and the St. Mary's School of Respiratory Care. All three programs are associated with Marshall University. St. Mary's is also home to a regional heart institute, regional cancer center, and regional neuroscience center. Huntington also holds multiple Psychiatric hospitals, including the 187-bed River Park Hospital.

Cabell Huntington Hospital is a not-for-profit, regional referral center with 303 staffed beds. Cabell Huntington cares for patients from more than 29 counties throughout West Virginia, Kentucky, and Ohio. Opened in 1956, it is also a teaching hospital and home to the Marshall University Medical Center, which includes the Joan C. Edwards Schools of Medicine and Nursing. Cabell Huntington is also home to the Edwards Comprehensive Cancer Center, the Hoops Family Children's Hospital, and the Robert C. Byrd Center for Rural Health; a distinguished leader nationwide for rural healthcare delivery.

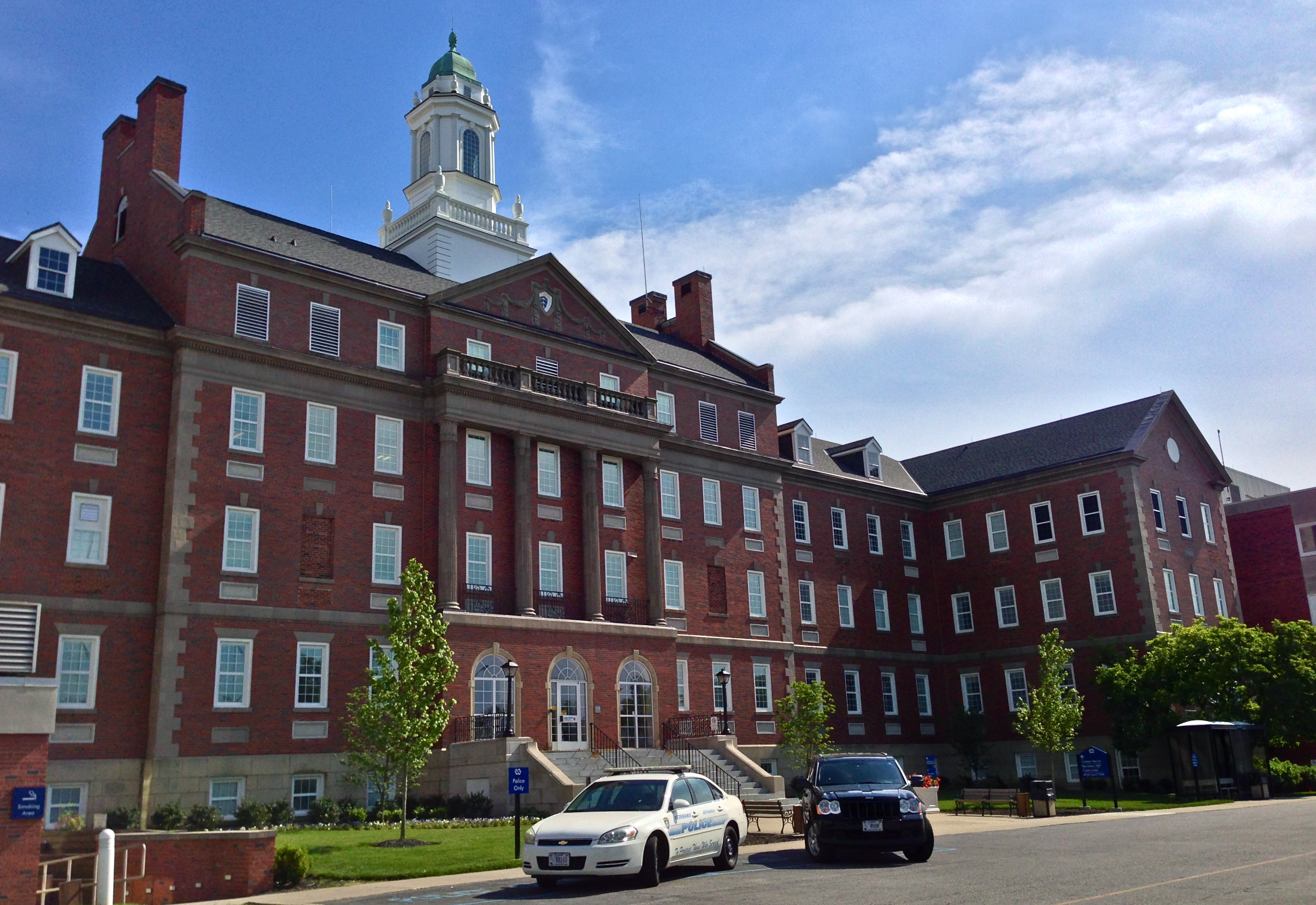
The main building of the Huntington VA Hospital

The Huntington Veteran's Administration (VA) Medical Center, on Spring Valley Drive, is an 80-bed medical and surgical care facility that offers primary inpatient and outpatient care, along with mental health services and subspeciality outpatient options. It is also the primary teaching facility for the Marshall University School of Medicine and is also affiliated with the University of Pikeville Kentucky College of Osteopathic Medicine. In 1993, the Robert C. Byrd Clinical Addition expanded the hospital's surgery, radiology, laboratory, cardiology, nuclear medicine, and rehabilitation services and renovated inpatient care facilities. In 1998, a $10 million research facility was completed. The hospital is also the home of the Marshall University School of Pharmacy.

The Autism Services Center (ASC), is a behavioral health medical center located in Huntington. After serving as the co founder, and first president of the Autism Society of America, Ruth C. Sullivan founded the Autism Services Center to help others with advocacy, training, and lecturing. Dustin Hoffman’s character in Rain Man, Raymond Babbitt, was heavily influenced by Joseph Sullivan, a patient of the Autism Services Center and the son of Ruth C. Sullivan.

== See also ==
- List of cities and towns along the Ohio River
- List of ports in the United States
- Timeline of Huntington, West Virginia
- USS Huntington, 3 ships
- Prom Night Murders
