= Carroll House (disambiguation) =

Carroll House was a racehorse trained in the United Kingdom.

Carroll House may also refer to:

in Australia

- Carroll Cottage, Kingaroy, South Burnett Region, Queensland, also known as "Daniel Carroll's House", heritage listed

in the United States

- Karsner-Carroll House, Florence, Alabama, listed on the National Register of Historic Places (NRHP)
- Dr. Clyde Carroll House, White Mills, Kentucky
- Carroll House Hotel, a hotel in North Dakota
- Chancellor James P. Carroll House, Allen, South Carolina
- Weisiger–Carroll House, Richmond, Virginia
- Thomas Carroll House, Washington, D.C.
- Carroll House (Clinton, Louisiana), NRHP-listed in East Feliciana Parish
- Carroll House Hotel, Fullerton, North Dakota, NRHP-listed
- Carroll Mansion, Baltimore, Maryland, NRHP-listed
- Carroll Place, St. George, South Carolina, NRHP-listed
- Carroll Stagecoach Inn, Oregon, Missouri, NRHP-listed
- Carroll Township Hall, Oak Harbor, Ohio, NRHP-listed
- Edward Carroll House, Leavenworth, Kansas, NRHP-listed
- J. J. Carroll House, Houston, Texas, NRHP-listed
- John M. Carroll House, Cave Spring, Georgia, NRHP-listed
- Thomas Battle Carroll House, Starkville, Mississippi, NRHP-listed
- Thomas Carroll House, Huntington, West Virginia, NRHP-listed
- Carroll-Harper House, Cave Spring, Georgia, NRHP-listed
- Carroll-Hartshorn House, Reading, Massachusetts, NRHP-listed

== See also ==
- Carroll Building (disambiguation)
- John Carroll University North Quad Historic District, University Heights, Ohio, NRHP-listed
- Carroll-Richardson Grist Mill, Cave Spring, Georgia, NRHP-listed
