= National Register of Historic Places listings in Cabell County, West Virginia =

Location of Cabell County in West Virginia

This is a list of the National Register of Historic Places listings in Cabell County, West Virginia.

This is intended to be a complete list of the properties and districts on the National Register of Historic Places in Cabell County, West Virginia. The locations of National Register properties and districts for which the latitude and longitude coordinates are included below, may be seen in an online map.

There are 43 properties and districts listed on the National Register in the county, 1 of which is a National Historic Landmark.

This National Park Service list is complete through NPS recent listings posted June 26, 2026.

Contents: Counties in West Virginia

Barbour - Berkeley - Boone - Braxton - Brooke - Cabell - Calhoun - Clay - Doddridge - Fayette - Gilmer - Grant - Greenbrier - Hampshire - Hancock - Hardy - Harrison - Jackson - Jefferson - Kanawha - Lewis - Lincoln - Logan - Marion - Marshall - Mason - McDowell - Mercer - Mineral - Mingo - Monongalia - Monroe - Morgan - Nicholas - Ohio - Pendleton - Pleasants - Pocahontas - Preston - Putnam - Raleigh - Randolph - Ritchie - Roane - Summers - Taylor - Tucker - Tyler - Upshur - Wayne - Webster - Wetzel - Wirt - Wood - Wyoming

== Current listings ==
	Name on the Register	Image	Date listed	Location	City or town	Description
1	14th Street West Historic District	14th Street West Historic District	July 19, 2024 (#100010590)	Roughly bounded by Madison Ave, Virginia Avenue, 15th Street West, and 13th Street West; 38°24′43″N 82°28′47″W	Huntington	
2	Baltimore and Ohio Railroad Depot	Baltimore and Ohio Railroad Depot	October 30, 1973 (#73001897)	1100 block of Veterans Memorial Boulevard; 38°25′24″N 82°26′33″W	Huntington	
3	Barboursville Historic District	Barboursville Historic District	December 24, 2008 (#08001234)	Water, Main, and Brady Sts. and Central Ave. 38°24′35″N 82°17′42″W	Barboursville	
4	Barnett Hospital and Nursing School	Barnett Hospital and Nursing School	December 30, 2009 (#09001190)	1201 7th Ave. 38°25′03″N 82°26′15″W	Huntington	
5	Bethel Memorial Park Cemetery		April 21, 2025 (#100011743)	South end of Bethel Road; 38°24′02″N 82°23′23″W	Huntington	
6	Cabell County Courthouse	Cabell County Courthouse	September 2, 1982 (#82004313)	5th Ave. and 8th St. 38°25′11″N 82°26′47″W	Huntington	
7	Campbell-Hicks House	Campbell-Hicks House	August 19, 1985 (#85001814)	1102 5th Ave. 38°25′12″N 82°26′21″W	Huntington	
8	Carnegie Public Library	Carnegie Public Library	April 3, 1980 (#80004015)	900 5th Ave. 38°25′11″N 82°26′36″W	Huntington	
9	Thomas Carroll House	Thomas Carroll House	June 1, 1973 (#73001898)	234 Guyan St. 38°25′44″N 82°23′24″W	Huntington	
10	Clover Site	Clover Site	April 27, 1992 (#92001881)	20 miles (32 km) above Huntington in the Green Bottom Wildlife Management Area; 38°35′24″N 82°13′54″W	Lesage	Fields along and above the Ohio River; a major Fort Ancient-period village site
11	Douglass Junior and Senior High School	Douglass Junior and Senior High School	December 5, 1985 (#85003091)	10th Ave. and Bruce St. 38°24′52″N 82°25′53″W	Huntington	
12	Downtown Huntington Historic District	Downtown Huntington Historic District	February 24, 1986 (#86000309)	Roughly bounded by 3rd Ave., 10th St., 5th Ave., and 7th and 8th Sts.; also portions of 3rd Ave. to the alley between 6th and 7th Aves. and from 12th St. to 7th St. 38°25′02″N 82°26′11″W	Huntington	Second set of boundaries represents a boundary increase of March 22, 2007
13	Ebenezer Church		May 11, 2026 (#100012986)	1651 Eighth Avenue; 38°25′03″N 82°25′39″W	Huntington	
14	Elk River Coal and Lumber Company No. 10 Steam Locomotive	Elk River Coal and Lumber Company No. 10 Steam Locomotive	September 28, 2006 (#06000901)	Junction of Veterans Memorial Boulevard and 11th St. 38°25′25″N 82°26′27″W	Huntington	
15	Foster Memorial Home	Foster Memorial Home	February 27, 2001 (#00001311)	700 Madison Ave. 38°24′46″N 82°28′01″W	Huntington	
16	Freeman Estate		April 23, 2009 (#09000243)	1805 McCoy Rd. 38°24′02″N 82°26′10″W	Huntington	
17	Memphis Tennessee Garrison House		January 23, 2017 (#100000573)	1701 10th Ave. 38°24′56″N 82°25′33″W	Huntington	
18	Harvey House	Harvey House	August 21, 1972 (#72001285)	1305 3rd Ave. 38°25′24″N 82°26′15″W	Huntington	
19	Hawthorne Historic District		August 2, 2007 (#07000786)	Roughly Hawthorne Way and portions of S. Whitaker Boulevard; 38°24′22″N 82°26′39″W	Huntington	
20	Huntington High School	Huntington High School	April 4, 2000 (#00000248)	900 8th St. 38°24′49″N 82°26′36″W	Huntington	
21	Gen. Albert Gallatin Jenkins House	Gen. Albert Gallatin Jenkins House	May 22, 1978 (#78002791)	8814 Ohio River Rd. 38°35′12″N 82°14′58″W	Green Bottom	
22	Johnston-Meek House	Johnston-Meek House	April 14, 2004 (#04000313)	203 6th Ave. 38°24′56″N 82°27′17″W	Huntington	
23	Kenwood		August 2, 2007 (#07000784)	619 Ridgewood Rd. 38°24′10″N 82°26′43″W	Huntington	
24	Liggett and Myers Tobacco Company	Liggett and Myers Tobacco Company	August 14, 1998 (#98001073)	9 27th St. 38°26′02″N 82°24′33″W	Huntington	
25	Marshall University Memorial Fountain	Marshall University Memorial Fountain	July 19, 2024 (#100010591)	1 John Marshall Drive; 38°25′22″N 82°25′44″W	Huntington	
26	Masonic Temple-Watts, Ritter, Wholesale Drygoods Company Building	Masonic Temple-Watts, Ritter, Wholesale Drygoods Company Building	August 26, 1993 (#93000614)	1100-1108 E. 3rd Ave. 38°25′22″N 82°26′28″W	Huntington	
27	George McComas House		January 9, 2026 (#100012523)	1118 Main Street; 38°24′30″N 82°17′24″W	Barboursville	
28	Memorial Arch	Memorial Arch	April 16, 1981 (#81000597)	Memorial Park; 38°24′23″N 82°27′46″W	Huntington	
29	Morris Memorial Hospital for Crippled Children		May 8, 2013 (#13000262)	Morris Memorial Rd. between the James River Turnpike and U.S. Route 60; 38°25′14″N 82°06′28″W	Milton	
30	Mortimer Place Historic District	Mortimer Place Historic District	March 12, 2001 (#01000266)	Bounded by an alley, 10th St., 12th Ave., and 11th St. 38°24′35″N 82°26′17″W	Huntington	
31	Mud River Covered Bridge	Mud River Covered Bridge	June 10, 1975 (#75001883)	Off U.S. Route 60 on County Route 25 over the Mud River; 38°25′51″N 82°08′22″W	Milton	
32	Ninth Street West Historic District	Ninth Street West Historic District	November 28, 1980 (#80004016)	9th St. West and Madison and Jefferson Aves. 38°24′44″N 82°28′14″W	Huntington	
33	Ohev Sholom Temple	Ohev Sholom Temple	March 17, 1994 (#94000211)	949 10th Ave. 38°24′44″N 82°26′24″W	Huntington	
34	Old Main, Marshall University	Old Main, Marshall University	July 16, 1973 (#73001899)	Hal Greer Boulevard on the Marshall University campus 38°25′23″N 82°25′47″W	Huntington	
35	Prichard House	Prichard House	March 12, 2001 (#01000261)	500 12th Ave. 38°24′31″N 82°26′51″W	Huntington	
36	Ricketts House	Ricketts House	July 15, 1994 (#94000721)	2301 Washington Boulevard; 38°24′21″N 82°24′44″W	Huntington	
37	Ritter Park Historic District	Ritter Park Historic District	November 28, 1990 (#90001774)	Ritter Park, including northern boundary streets 38°24′15″N 82°26′16″W	Huntington	
38	Rotary Park Bridge	Rotary Park Bridge	December 12, 2002 (#02001525)	Rotary Park, 31 St., and Rotary Dr. 38°25′07″N 82°23′39″W	Huntington	
39	Simms School Building	Simms School Building	May 12, 1997 (#96000438)	1680 11th Ave. 38°24′50″N 82°25′34″W	Huntington	
40	Thornburg House	Thornburg House	April 25, 1991 (#91000451)	700 Main St. 38°24′35″N 82°17′40″W	Barboursville	
41	U.S. Post Office and Courthouse	U.S. Post Office and Courthouse	April 15, 1982 (#82004314)	845 5th Ave. 38°25′08″N 82°26′38″W	Huntington	
42	Zachary Taylor Wellington House	Zachary Taylor Wellington House	December 24, 2008 (#08001235)	415 Main St. 38°25′29″N 82°23′23″W	Huntington	
43	West Virginia Colored Children's Home	West Virginia Colored Children's Home	November 13, 1997 (#97001413)	3353 U.S. Route 60; 38°24′34″N 82°22′25″W	Huntington	Demolished on May 5, 2011 to make room for a new middle school.

== Former listings ==
	Name on the Register	Image	Date listed	Location	City or town	Description
1	Chesapeake and Ohio 1308 Steam Locomotive	Chesapeake and Ohio 1308 Steam Locomotive	January 31, 2003 (#02001571)	1401 Memorial Boulevard; 38°24′19″N 82°28′38″W	Huntington	Donated to Age of Steam Roundhouse in September 2025 and later moved. Property move to Tuscarawas County, Ohio approved on May 22, 2026.

== See also ==
- List of National Historic Landmarks in West Virginia
- National Register of Historic Places listings in West Virginia
