= Guyandotte, Huntington, West Virginia =

Historic neighborhood in West Virginia

Coordinates: 38°25′37″N 82°23′07″W

Guyandotte is a historic neighborhood in the city of Huntington, West Virginia, that previously existed as a separate town before annexation was completed by the latter. The neighborhood is home to many historic properties, and was first settled by natives of France at the end of the eighteenth century. Guyandotte was already a thriving town when the state of West Virginia was formed from part of Virginia. Located at the confluence of the Guyandotte River and the Ohio River, it was already a regional trade center with several industries of its own when the Chesapeake and Ohio Railway (C&O) reached its western terminus nearby just across the Guyandotte River in 1873. This event was soon followed by the formation and quick development of the present city of Huntington which was named in honor of the C&O Railway's founder and then principal owner Collis P. Huntington.

== History ==
First settled in 1799, Guyandotte was established on a tract of land belonging to the Savage Grant, a 28,628-acre (115.85 km^{2}) parcel of land in western Virginia granted to veterans of the French and Indian War. These veterans served under Captain John Savage. The original grant extended from the present site of Milton, West Virginia in the east, to the Kentucky side of the Big Sandy River, then part of Virginia, in the west. Nearly all of present-day Huntington is situated on land that was part of the Savage Grant.

Before it was annexed by Huntington, Guyandotte was an old Federal Era town and had homes dating back to 1820. A graveyard containing 18th-century French and Colonial-era settlers with surnames such as LeTulle, Holderby, and Buffington, continues to exist in the neighborhood. Huntington was known as Holderby's Landing prior to 1871, and members of the Buffington family held tracts of land that later became the Huntington Land Company. The Buffingtons were the only revolutionary-era Savage Grant claimants to continuously reside within the area, and later generations of Buffingtons were associated with Marshall College (now Marshall University) and were business partners of Collis P. Huntington. The Confederate Army general Albert Gallatin Jenkins' plantation home, Green Bottom, is located in nearby Lesage. Green Bottom was listed on the National Register of Historic Places in 1978.

As the state of Virginia voted to secede the citizens of Guyandotte took action. On April 20, 1861, a group of men gathered outside the Planter's Hotel where a "secessionist" flag was raised by Elijah Ricketts and John W. Ong. As W.S. Laidley rested on the sidewalk in front of the hotel a shot struck the hotel over his head, with some believing this shot came from across the Ohio River. By the end of May the flag was nowhere to be seen as the steamer Ben Franklin passed Guyandotte.

As the Civil War progressed Guyandotte earned a reputation as a continued hotbed of secession. On November 10, 1861, a Confederate cavalry force of over 700 quickly overtook a Union encampment in Guyandotte. Much of the town celebrated the victory, but over 90 citizens were captured and sent to Richmond for imprisonment. The next morning, the Confederates withdrew from Guyandotte and a detachment of the 5th West Virginia Infantry (Union) arrived. The infantry burned a large portion of the town in response to the townspeople aiding the Confederates in their raid the day before. Contributing to the burning of Guyandotte was the town's reputation as a hotbed of secession. The Wheeling Intelligencer wrote on November 13, 1861, "Guyandotte... has always had the reputation of being the 'ornaryest' place on the Ohio River. It was at 'Guyan" where counterfeiter, horsethieves and murderers 'did most congregate.' It was a Vicksburg on a small scale. It was the first town on the Ohio River to display a secession flag, and has always been the worst secession nest in that whole country. It ought to have been burned two or three years ago."

At the time of Huntington's founding, Holderby's Landing was already the home of Marshall College, a normal school that had been founded in 1837 as Marshall Academy. Originally, Marshall Academy was essentially a boarding school, under control of the Southern Methodist Episcopal Church, and intended to serve high school students from wealthy families. In 1857, the school became Marshall College, which in turn became a public institution in 1867. The college later became Marshall University in 1961 and now occupies a large portion of the city to the immediate east of the downtown central business district (CBD).

Historic buildings at Guyandotte include the Madie Carroll House and the Zachary Taylor Wellington House, both listed on the National Register of Historic Places.

== See also ==
- List of neighborhoods in Huntington, West Virginia
