= Memphis Tennessee Garrison =

Activist for African Americans and young women in rural West Virginia (1890–1988)

- Born: Memphis Tennessee Carter; March 3, 1890; Hollins, Virginia, U.S.
- Died: July 25, 1988 (aged 98); Huntington, West Virginia, U.S.
- Education: Bluefield State College; Ohio University
- Occupations: Educator, activist

Memphis Tennessee Garrison (March 3, 1890 – July 25, 1988) was an activist for African Americans and young women during the Jim Crow Era in rural West Virginia. Garrison was a McDowell County teacher and community mediator, famous for organizing West Virginia's third chapter of the Gary Branch of the NAACP in 1921. Additionally, from 1931 to 1946, Garrison was the community mediator for U.S. Steel Gary Mines. Some of Garrison's other notable achievements range from establishing the Gary Branch of the National Association for the Advancement of Colored People, to organizing Girl Scout troops for African American girls, to creating a breakfast program from impoverished students during the Great Depression and finally to creating the "Negro Artist Series."

== Early life and education ==
Memphis Tennessee Carter was born in Hollins, Virginia on March 3, 1890, to Cassie Thomas Carter and Wesley Carter. Both her parents were former slaves, and later her father became a coal miner. Memphis was the youngest of two children and due to her father's profession, her family spent her childhood in the Southern West Virginia coalfields. Memphis spent most of her days receiving an elementary education from the segregated West Virginia public schools. Later in life, Memphis went on to marry William "Melvin" Garrison, an electrician and coal company foreman from Gary, McDowell County of West Virginia, on October 5, 1918. Memphis and Melvin never had any children, though if she had it is likely her career would have been shortened due to open discouragement of employing teachers with children in West Virginia schools during this time. She eventually received a B.A. with honors from Bluefield State College in 1939, and proceeded to advanced studies at Ohio University.

== Jobs ==
Garrison began her career as a teacher at a public school in McDowell County in 1908 and remained there until the early 1950s when she retired. Although she dreamed of becoming a lawyer, she could not afford the required training. While she was a teacher, she also acted as a community mediator for U.S. Gary Steel Mines. She was instrumental in this as she resolved conflicts and complaints on behalf of the steel workers.

She was also a big influence in the politics of her area. As secretary of the Gary Branch of the NAACP, she carried out many projects and campaigns against racism towards colored people. One of her most famous campaigns was the Christmas seal campaign during the late 1920s and early 1930s. This project emphasized “Justice for All.” It collected large amounts of money for the main office of NAACP and produced widespread support for the organization. Her work in the NAACP also helped pass an anti-lynching bill in West Virginia. She eventually became vice president of the organization's Gary Branch from 1963 to 1966.

She dedicated her later life to civic service and took leading roles in many different organizations for the improvement of her state and nation. She was later rewarded with multiple honors for her dedication and service in the Civil Rights area and her constant battles for alleviation of class and gender racism.

== Legacy ==
While Garrison contributed greatly toward the bettering of race relations during a time of immense segregation, she did not always escape repercussions. She received backlash for supporting Joe Parsons, a black man running for Sheriff, and was ultimately suspended from teaching for a year. Garrison notes that she gathered the strength to achieve all that she did and deal with controversies through her Christian faith. Memphis Tennessee Garrison took the initiative to advocate for her beliefs and lead her community to racial and gender equality during a time when women had limited rights. It is important to know that Memphis Tennessee Garrison was a successful activist despite the fact that she had very limited economic resources.

Garrison's house in Huntington, West Virginia was added to the National Register of Historic Places in 2017. Her house is a potential community house museum for the civil rights movement. According to Owens Brown, current President of the West Virginia State NAACP, Garrison's house is an institution that commemorates Huntington's black community and serves as a remembrance of Garrison's work and activism.
