= Campbell–Hicks House =

Historic house in West Virginia, United States

- U.S. National Register of Historic Places
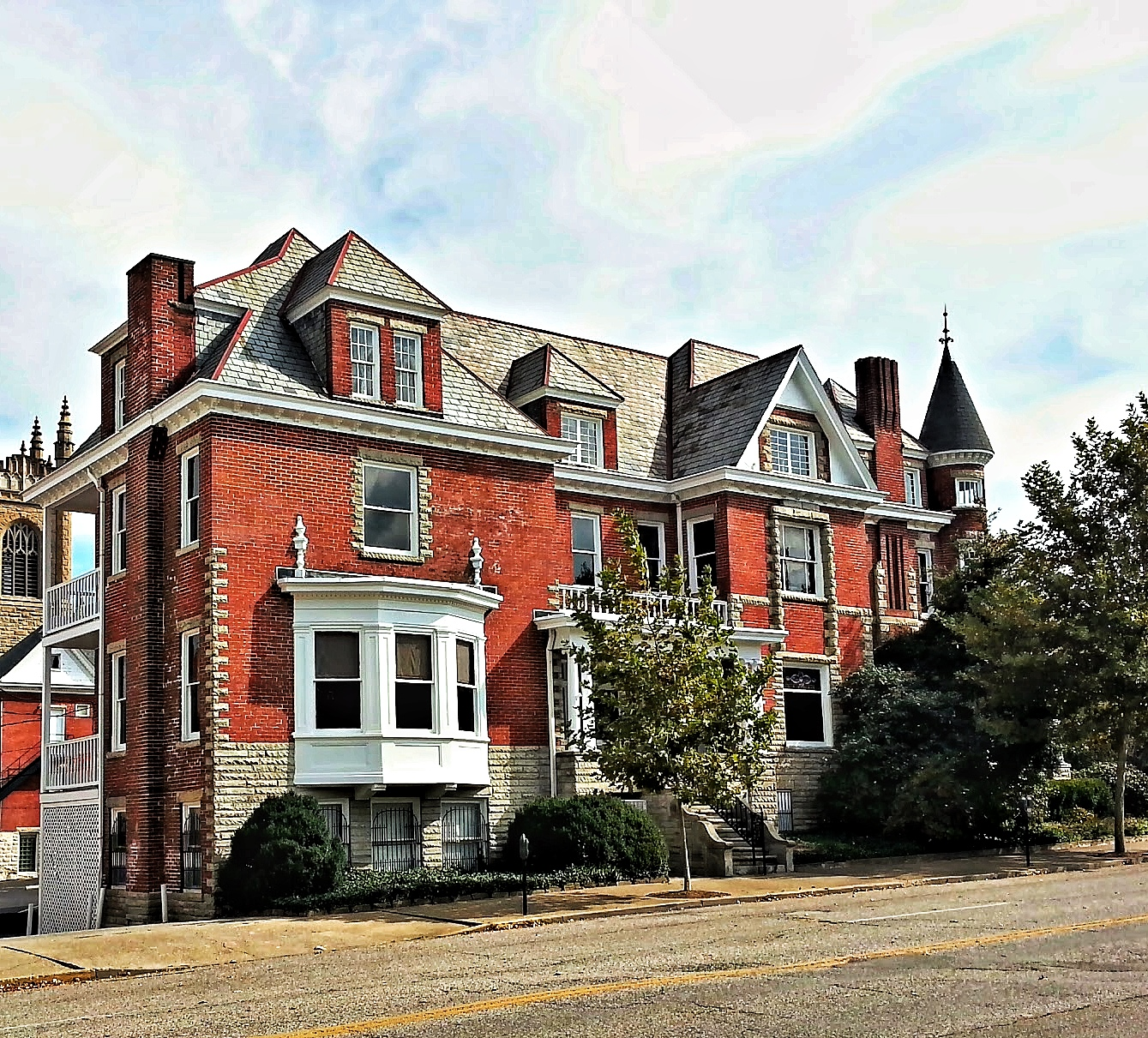
- Campbell–Hicks House, October 2012

- Location within West Virginia Location within the United States
- Location: 1102 Fifth Ave., Huntington, West Virginia
- Coordinates: 38°25′12″N 82°26′21″W
- Area: 0.1 acres (0.040 ha)
- Built: 1896
- Architectural style: Queen Anne
- NRHP reference No.: 85001814
- Added to NRHP: August 19, 1985

Campbell–Hicks House is a historic home located at Huntington, Cabell County, West Virginia. It was built in 1896, and is a 2 1/2-story, masonry dwelling in the Queen Anne style. It features a slender, two story cantilevered rounded tower. It also has a full front porch with a roof upheld by five sets of paired fluted columns with Ionic order capitals.

It was listed on the National Register of Historic Places in 1985.

== See also ==
- National Register of Historic Places listings in Cabell County, West Virginia
