= Zachary Taylor Wellington House =

Historic house in West Virginia, United States

- U.S. National Register of Historic Places
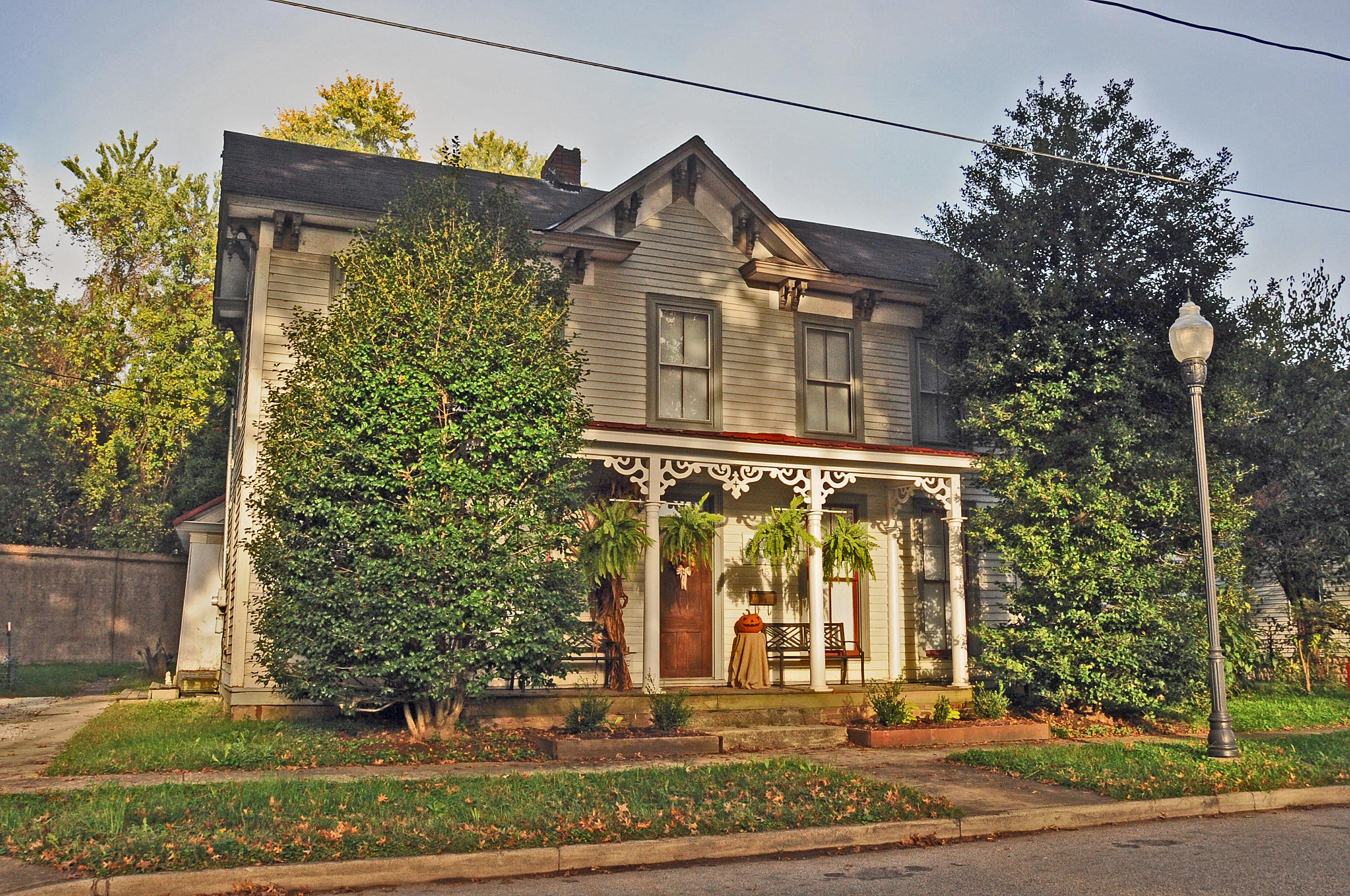

- Location within West Virginia Location within the United States
- Location: 415 Main St., Huntington, West Virginia
- Coordinates: 38°25′35″N 82°23′24″W
- Area: less than one acre
- Architect: Z.T. Wellington, Erastus Wellington
- Architectural style: Late Victorian, Folk Victorian
- NRHP reference No.: 08001235
- Added to NRHP: December 24, 2008

Zachary Taylor Wellington House is a historic home located at Huntington, Cabell County, West Virginia. It is a two-story I-house form dwelling. It was originally constructed about 1847, as a small, 1 1/2-story, hall-and parlor house. About 1870, an addition and substantial changes were made giving the house its current appearance with Folk Victorian detailing. The house is associated with Zachary Taylor Wellington (18 April 1847 – 25 August 1923), a prominent Republican politician who served in numerous public offices while residing in Guyandotte.

It was listed on the National Register of Historic Places in 2008.

== See also ==
- National Register of Historic Places listings in Cabell County, West Virginia
