= Memphis Tennessee Garrison House =

Historic house in West Virginia, United States

- U.S. National Register of Historic Places
- Location within West Virginia Location within the United States
- Location: 1701 10th Ave., Huntington, West Virginia
- Coordinates: 38°24′56″N 82°25′33″W
- Area: less than one acre
- Built: 1920
- NRHP reference No.: 100000573
- Added to NRHP: January 23, 2017

The Memphis Tennessee Garrison House is a historic house at 1701 10th Avenue in Huntington, West Virginia. Built about 1920, this modest two-story frame house was the home of Memphis Tennessee Garrison (1890-1988), a leading figure in the advance of African-American civil rights in Huntington, for the last forty years of her life. Garrison was a teacher, political organizer, and influential leader of the local branch of the NAACP. She was the first female of the West Virginia State Teachers Association, and vice-president of the American Teachers Association, an association of teachers working in segregated schools.

The house was listed on the National Register of Historic Places in 2017. It is in the process of being converted into a museum.

== See also ==
- National Register of Historic Places listings in Cabell County, West Virginia
