= Mortimer Place Historic District =

Historic district in West Virginia, United States

- U.S. National Register of Historic Places
- U.S. Historic district
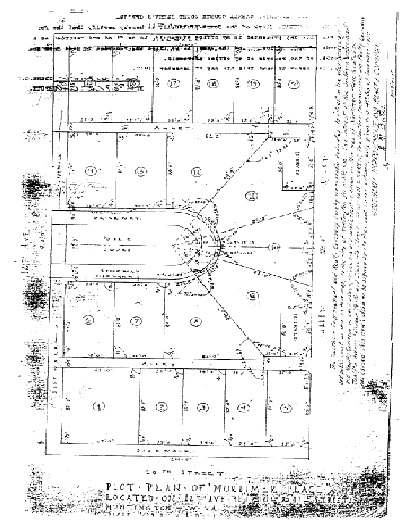
- Mortimer Place Plot Plan 1917

- Location within West Virginia Location within the United States
- Location: Bounded by an alley, 10th St., 12th Ave., and 11th St., Huntington, West Virginia
- Coordinates: 38°24′35″N 82°26′17″W
- Area: 2 acres (0.81 ha)
- Built: 1915
- Architect: Bates Jr., Richard Mortimer
- Architectural style: Colonial Revival, Tudor Revival, et al.
- NRHP reference No.: 01000266
- Added to NRHP: March 12, 2001

Mortimer Place Historic District is a national historic district located at Huntington, Cabell County, West Virginia. The district encompasses 21 contributing buildings and 1 contributing structure. The district is composed entirely of early 20th century residences, the majority of which are Colonial Revival and Tudor Revivalstyle. They were built between about 1915 and 1930, and feature sloping roofs, parapet walls, and wooden brackets and moldings. The residential development was designed and built by architect Richard Mortimer Bates, Jr. The Mortimer Place Historic District was listed on the National Register of Historic Places in 2001.

== Architect ==
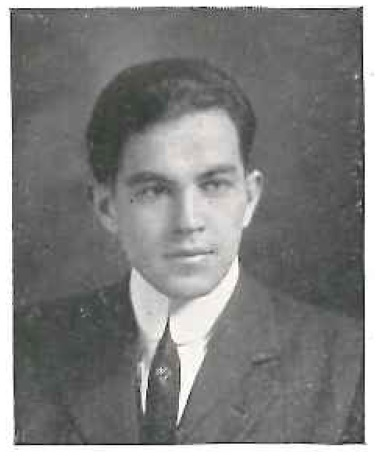
Richard Mortimer Bates, Jr.

Richard Mortimer Bates, Jr. (1887-1948) was born in Birmingham, Alabama and graduated from the University of Pennsylvania School of Architecture in 1911. The University of Pennsylvania, School of Architecture was established on October 7, 1890, and was a leading architectural school in the United States wielding significant influence under a Beaux Arts curriculum established first by the Ecole des Beaux Arts in Paris. Upon graduating from the University of Pennsylvania, Bates obtained a competitive appointment to the Ecole Nationale et Speciale des Beaux Arts and studied in the atelier of M. Bernier. The Ecole des Beaux was considered the "finest school of architecture in the world." While in Europe, Bates took a Grand Tour, further educating himself on Greek, Roman, Italian Renaissance and Baroque architectural elements. These architectural elements undoubtedly influenced Bates, as he laid out the plot plan for Mortimer Place, with its efficient use of space, common areas and wide-ranging architectural styles.

Richard M. Bates, Jr. relocated to California and later designed the Westlake Theater, which was listed on the National Register of Historic Places in 2008. The Westlake Theater was designed in the Mission/Spanish Colonial Revival Style with Churrigueresque detailing on the exterior and Renaissance and Adamesque references on the interior.

Bates through his early professional training worked for many notable architectural firms of the early 20th Century including, Whidden and Lewis, Albert E. Doyle, Charles A. Platt, James Gamble Rogers, George P. Post, Arnold Brunner, Cope and Stewardson and Benjamin R. Stevens.

== Mortimer Place Contributing Structures and Cul-de-sac ==
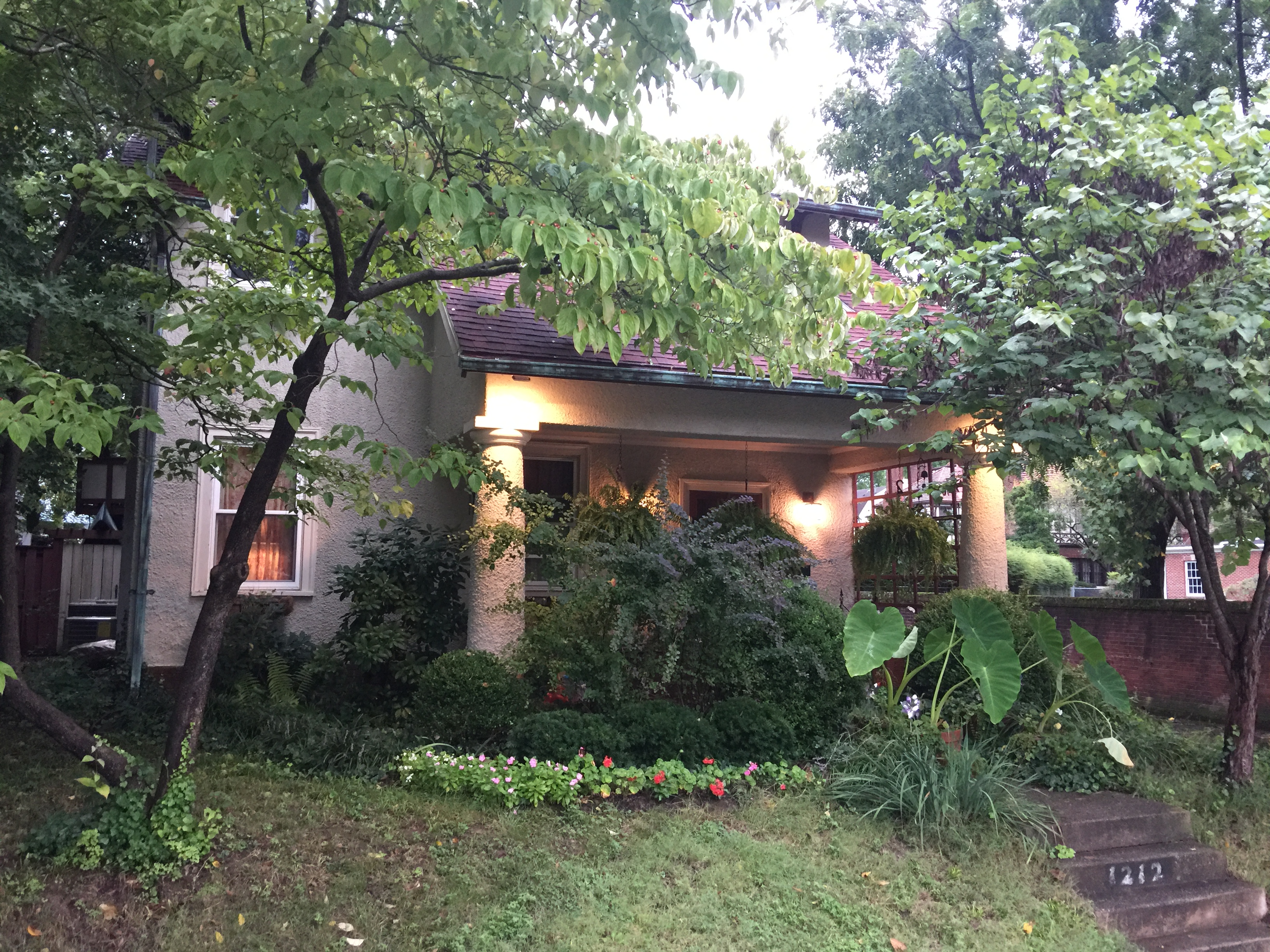
1212 10th Street Mortimer Place Historic District is a stucco bungalow with an extended shed porch with Doric columns.

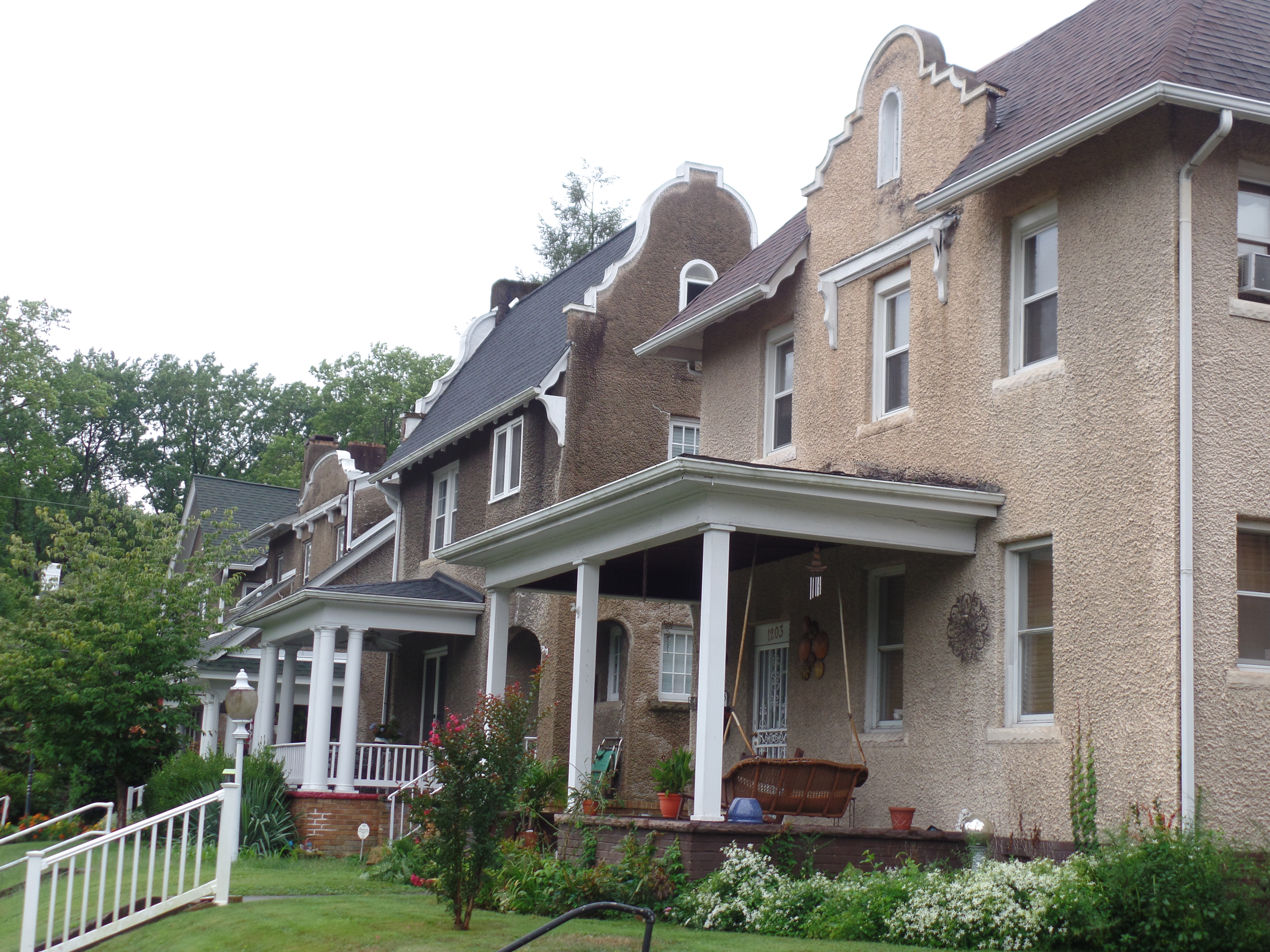
11th Street Mortimer Place Historic District exhibiting multiple architectural styles.

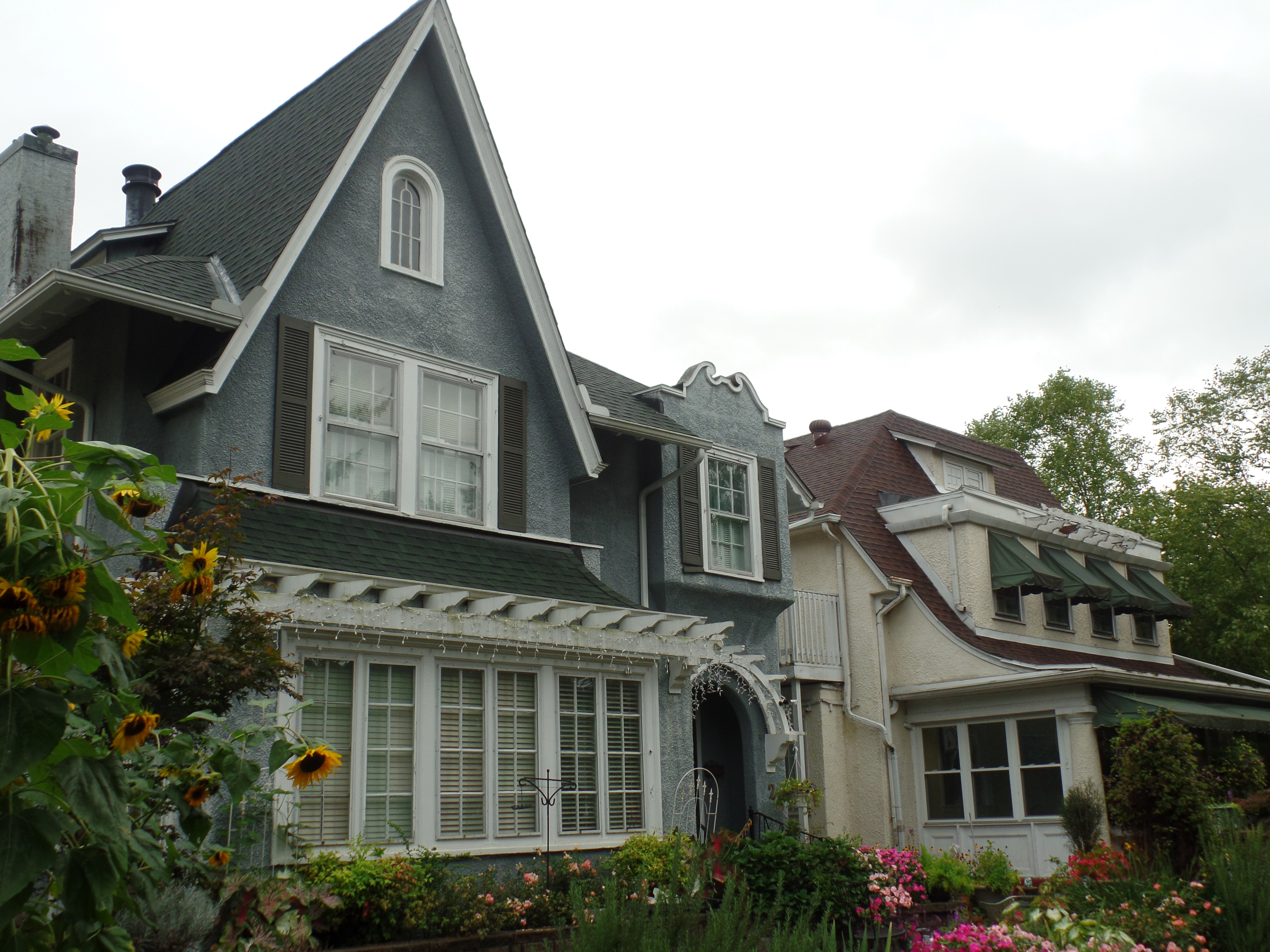
Number 1 and 2 Mortimer Place Historic District.

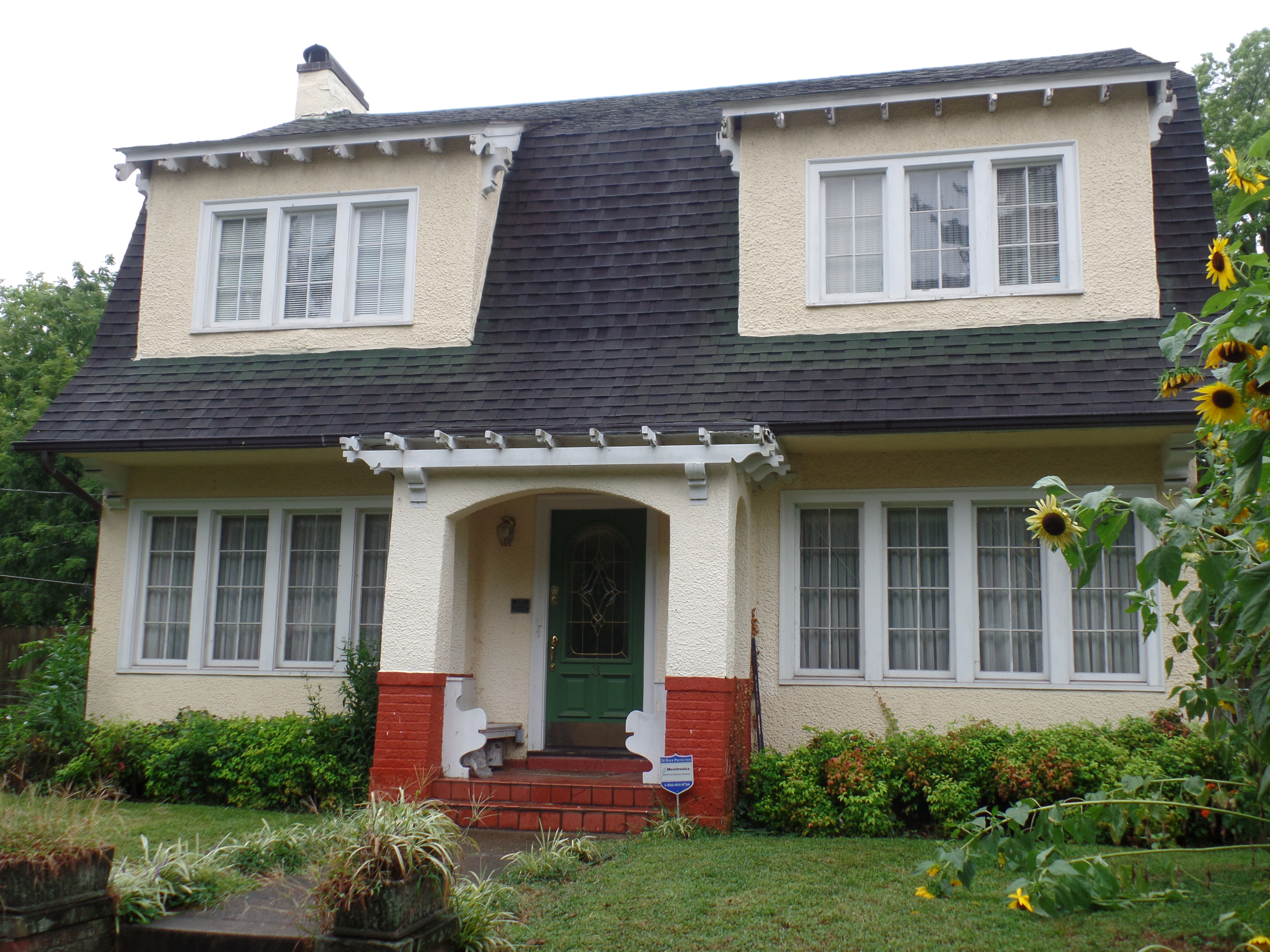
Number 3 Mortimer Place Historic District.

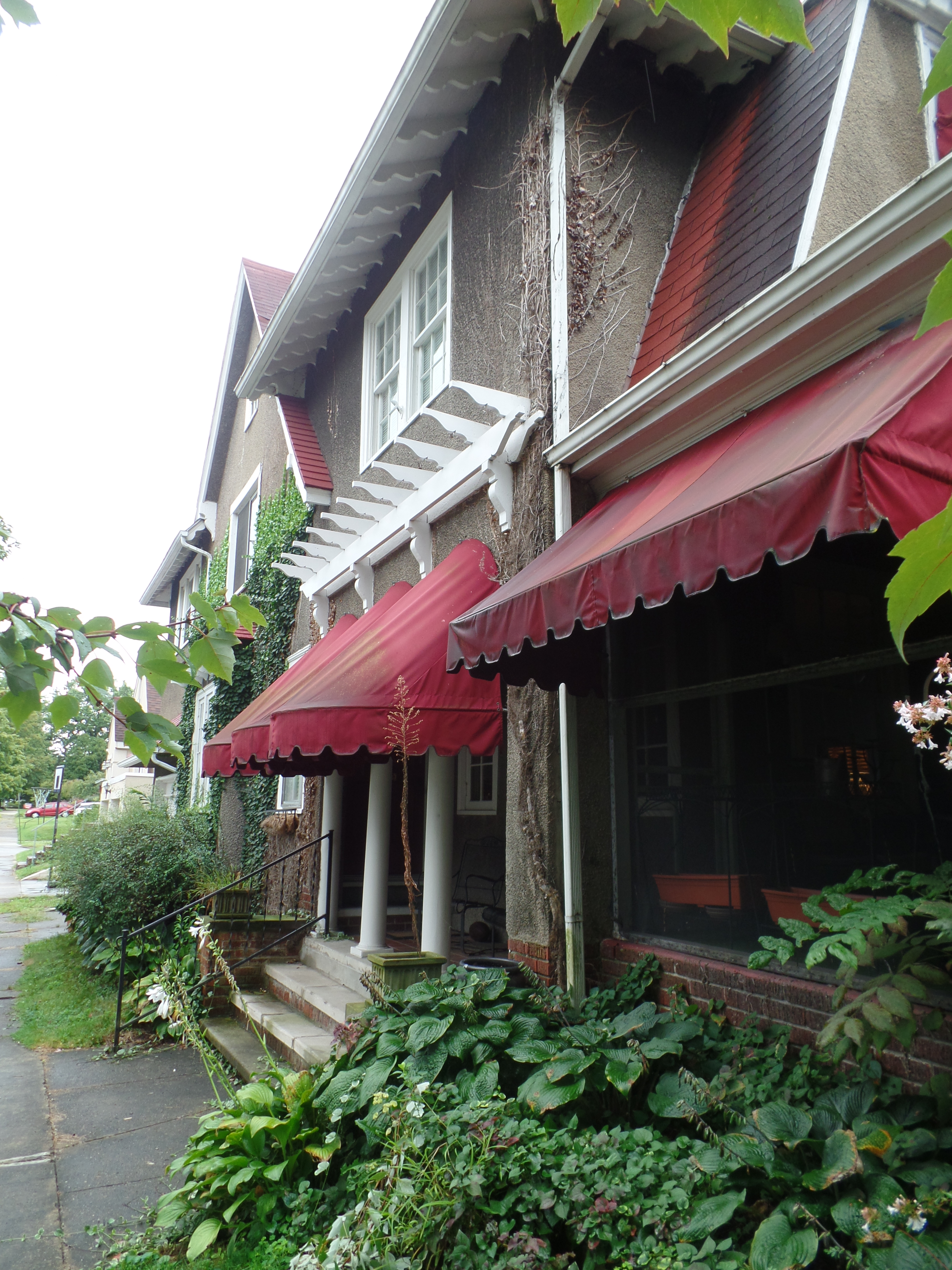
Number 9 Mortimer Place Historic District.

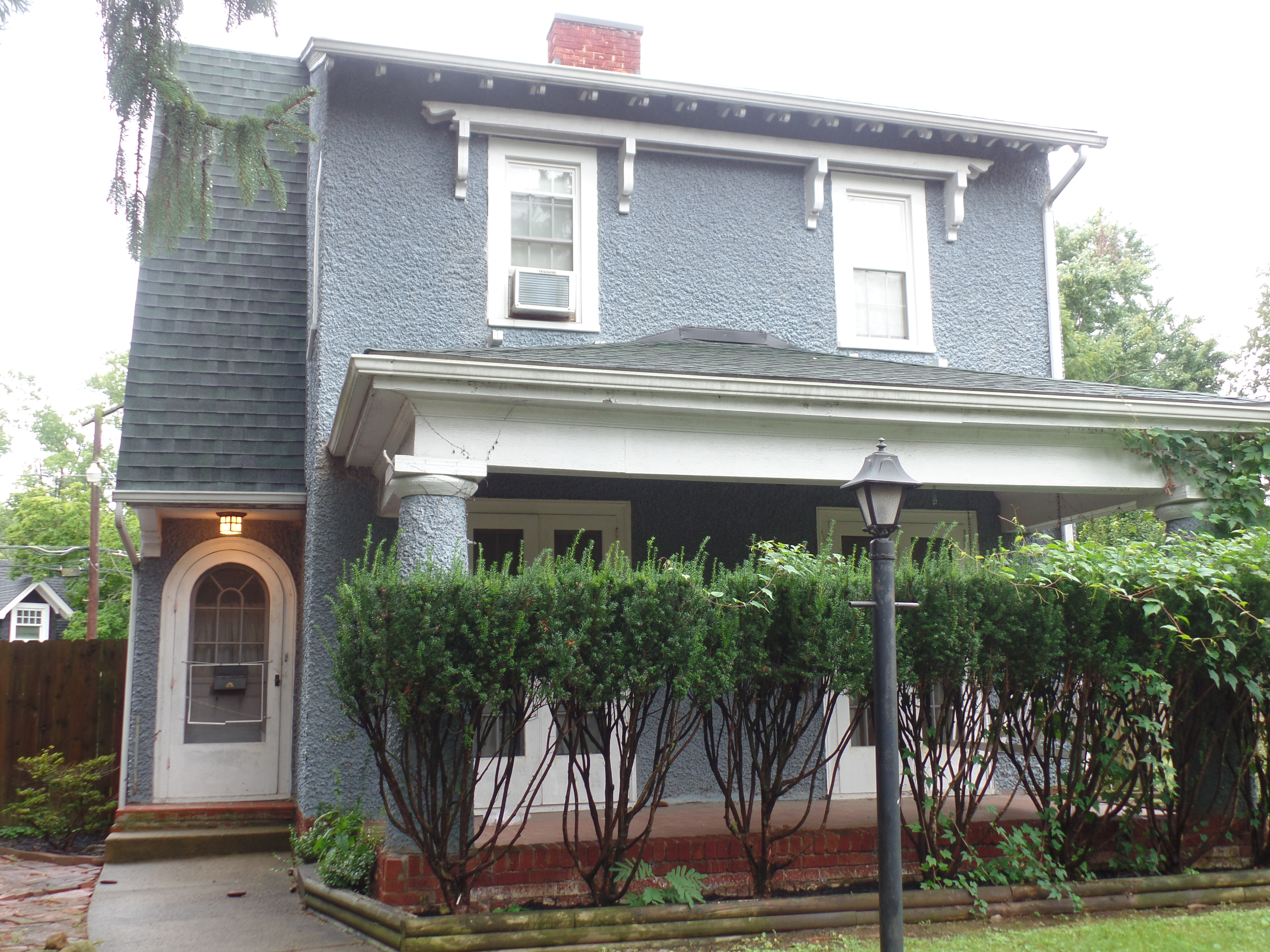
Number 4 Mortimer Place Historic District.
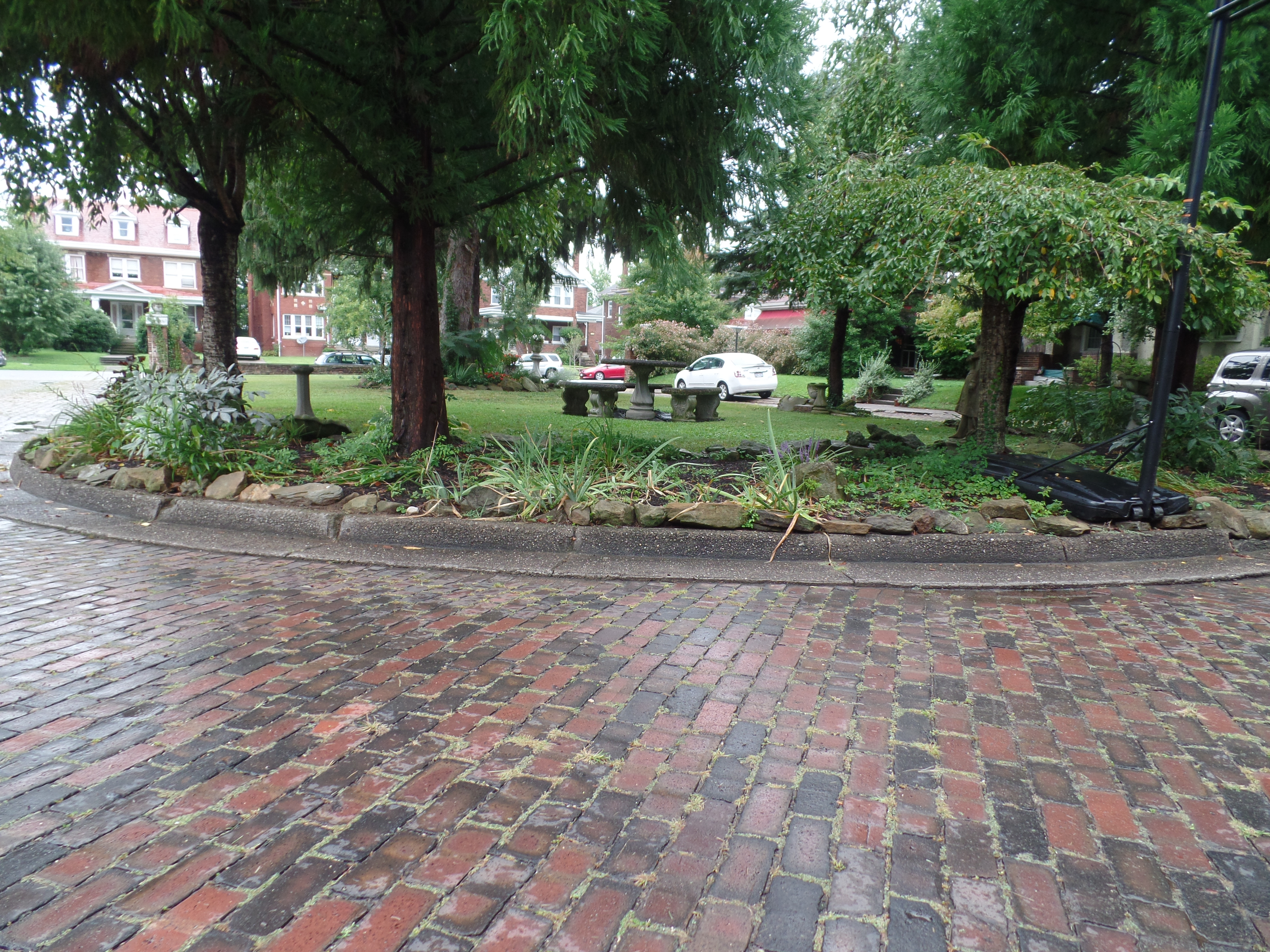
Mortimer Place Historic District Cul-de-sac and Green Space.

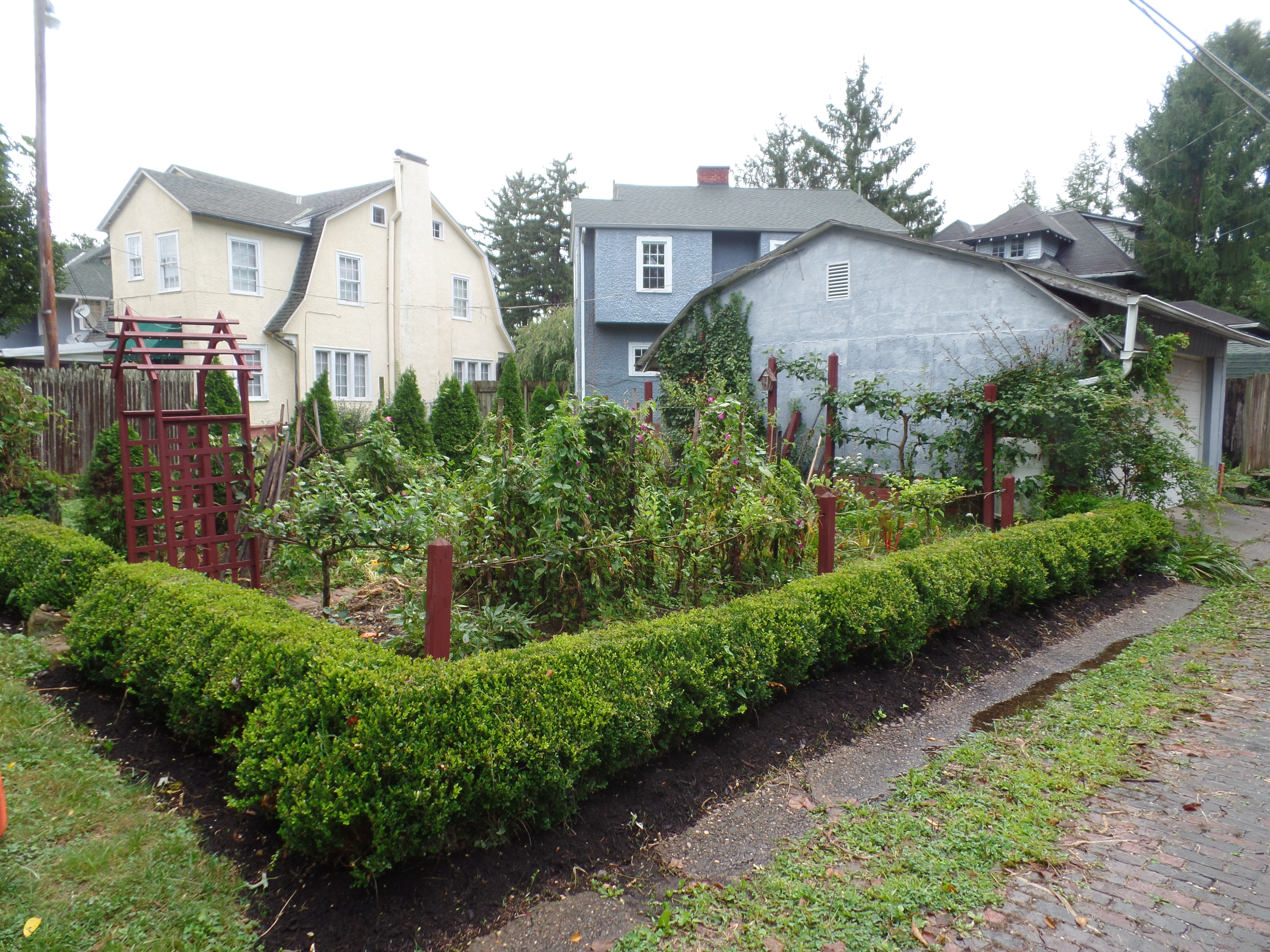
Garden located on the site of two former carriage houses located within the Mortimer Place Historic District.

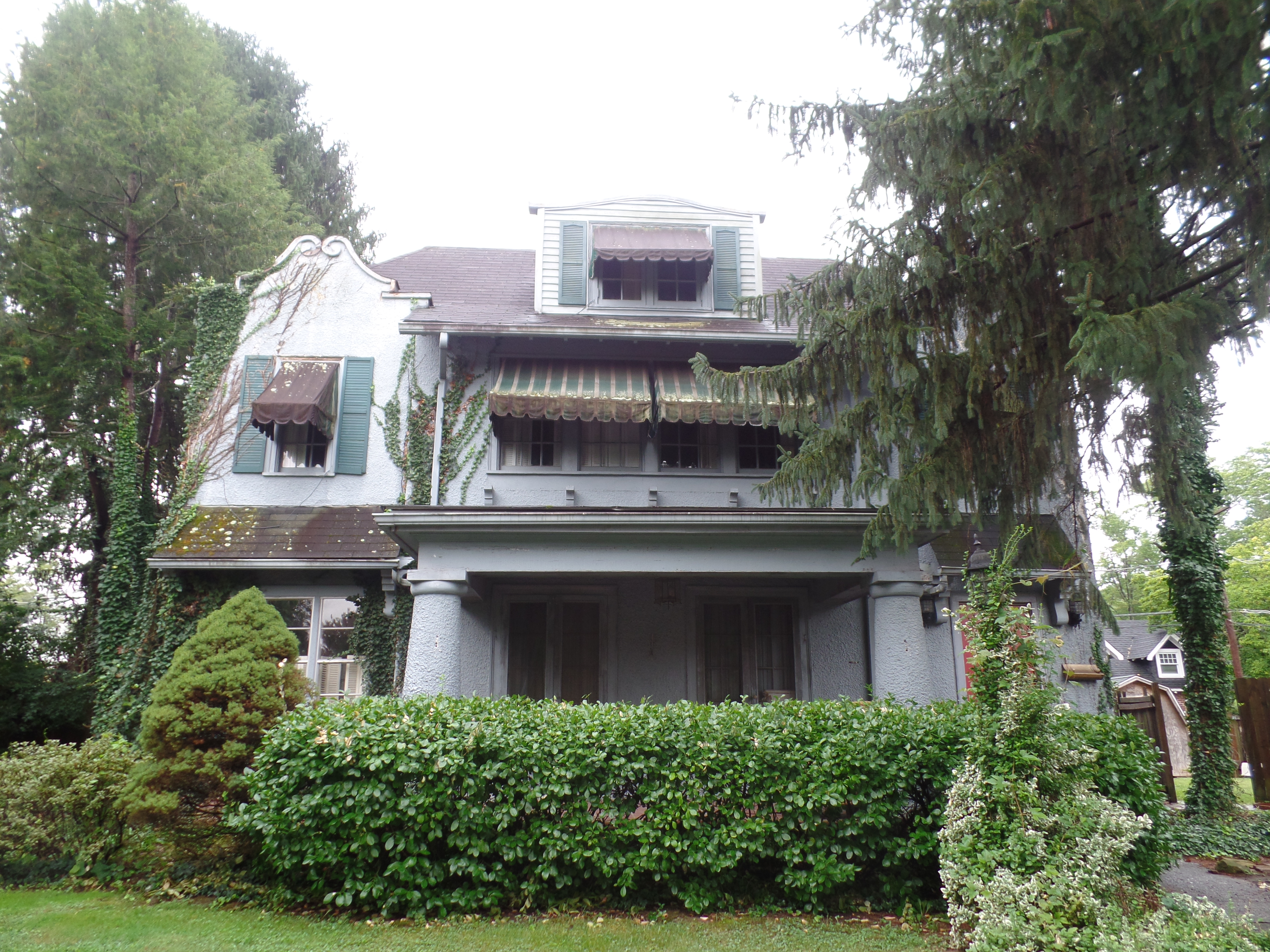
Number 5 Mortimer Place Historic District.

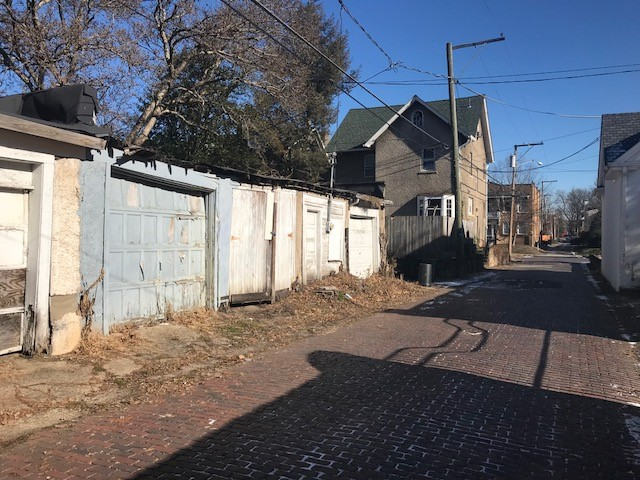
Mortimer Place Historic District Carriage Houses. The carriage houses once served individual residential structures and are considered contributing structures within the historict district.

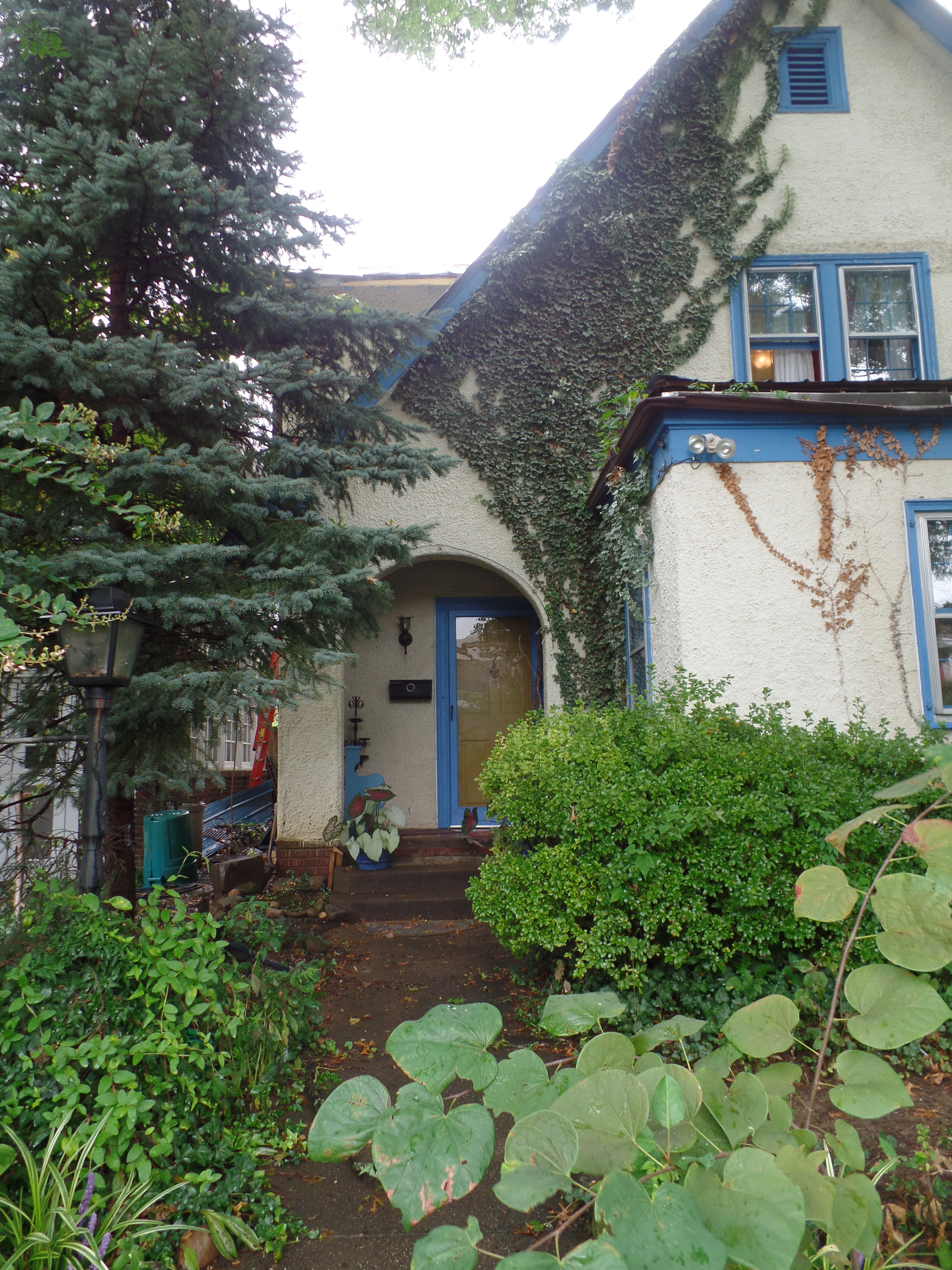
1206 10th Street Mortimer Place Historic District.

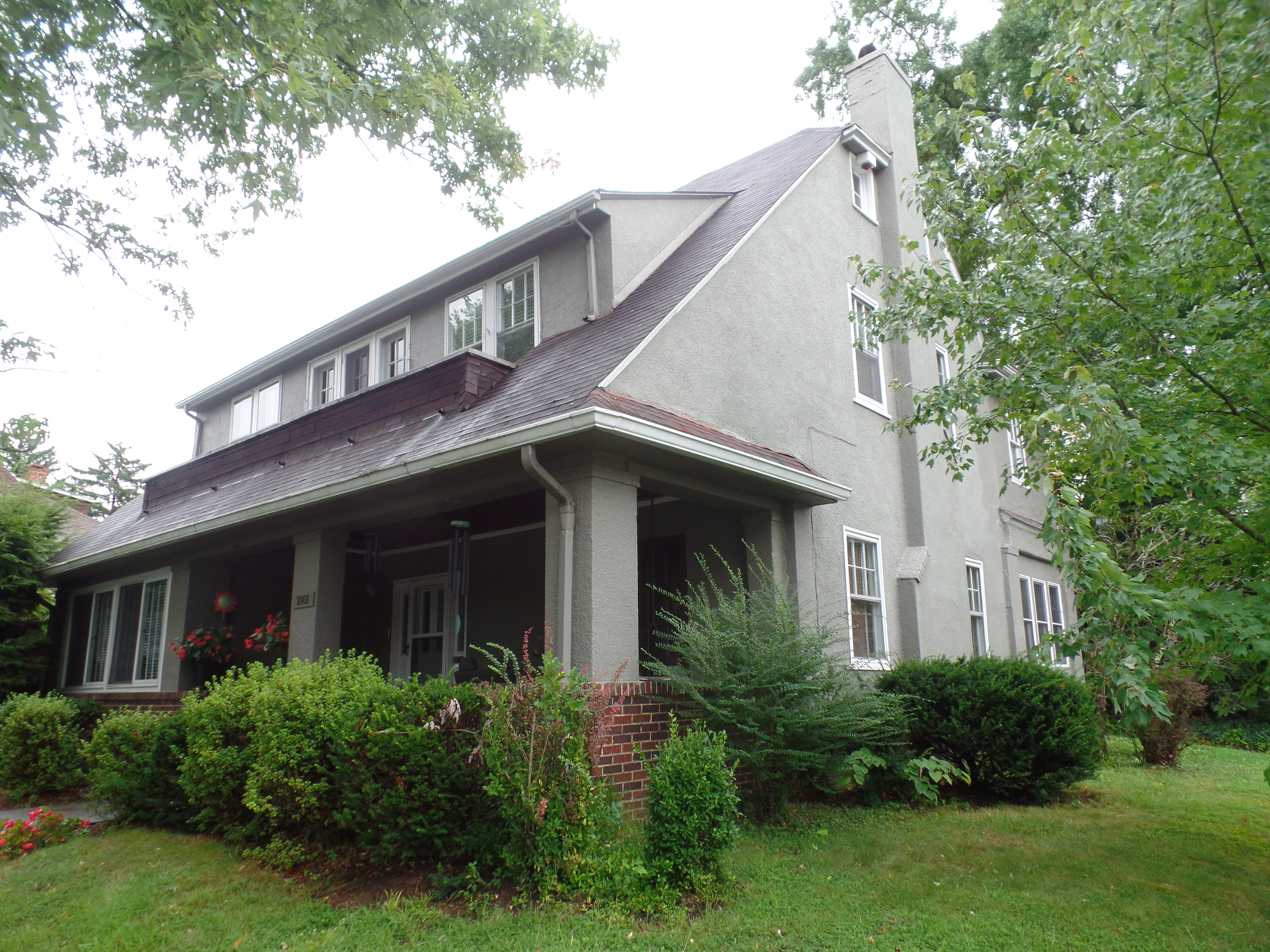
1001 12th Avenue Mortimer Place Historic District.

== See also ==
- National Register of Historic Places listings in Cabell County, West Virginia
