= Clover site =

Archaeological type site in West Virginia

- Clover Site (46CB40)
- U.S. National Register of Historic Places
- U.S. National Historic Landmark
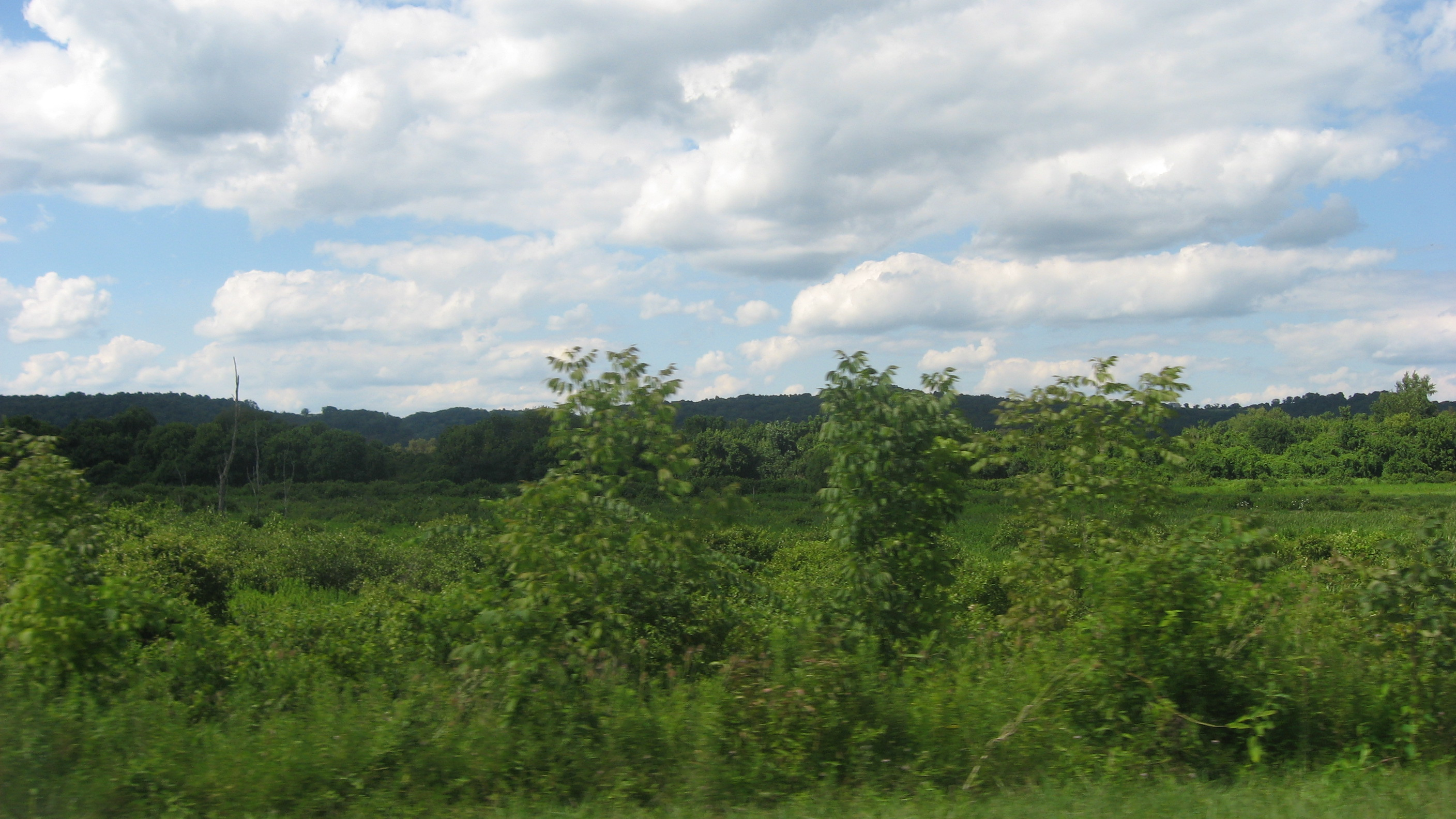
- Looking toward the site from the south
- Location: Lesage, West Virginia
- NRHP reference No.: 92001881

Significant dates
- Added to NRHP: April 27, 1992
- Designated NHL: April 27, 1992

The Clover Site (46CB40) is a Fort Ancient culture archaeological site located near Lesage in Cabell County, West Virginia, United States. It is significant for its well-preserved remains of a late prehistoric/protohistoric Native American village. The site's unique assemblage has made it the type site for the Clover Phase of the Madisonville horizon of the Fort Ancient culture.

The site was declared a National Historic Landmark in 1992.

== Description ==
The site is located 20 miles (32 km) north of Huntington on a high flood terrace of the Ohio River, within the Green Bottom Wildlife Management Area. At 5 acres, it was a large village with a semi-circular layout. It had a centrally located plaza surrounded by habitation areas, very similar to other Fort Ancient sites, although a palisade such as ones found at other sites has yet to be found at Clover. The site once was described as having three raised mound like areas 5 feet (1.5 m) high and 200 feet (61 m) wide, but they can no longer be located. Investigations at the site have produced Native American produced shell-tempered ceramics, stone tools, bone tools, and ornaments. Items of European manufacture, including brass and copper ornaments and glass trade beads have definitively dated the upper levels of the site to the protohistoric period. The artifact assemblages found at the site by avocational archaeologists such as John J. Adams and S.F. Dunett in the 1920s and professional investigations in the 1940s by James B. Griffin, enabled Griffin to propose the Clover Phase of the Madisonville complex that spanned the years 1550 to 1600, a way of identifying this protohistoric time period at other contemporary sites in the region. Other investigations were undertaken at the site in the 1980s by Nicholas Freidin of Marshall University, who conducted an archaeological field school there from 1984 to 1988. Items excavated from the site are now part of the John Adams Collection of artifacts curated by the Huntington Museum of Art.

== Connection to other sites ==
Other sites with significant Clover Phase habitations include Lower Shawneetown, the Buffalo Indian Village, Hardin Village, Madisonville, Rolfe Lee, Logan, and Marmet Village. Pottery excavated from many of these different sites, with types including Madisonville Plain, Cordmarked, or Smoothed Cordmarked wares, have a unique feature (a 2-twist direction to the cordage) which is rarely found in pottery from sites to the west of the Clover Site and are relatively common at sites to its east. This suggest that Clover people maintained closer contact with sites such as Buffalo, Gue Farm, Marmet, and Rolfe Lee than with other sites that were to its west. Other exotic artifacts found at the site, such as shell gorgets associated with the Southeastern Ceremonial Complex, pottery effigy bowls, and figurines show a connection with Mississippian culture villages in what is now eastern Tennessee.

== See also ==
- National Register of Historic Places listings in Cabell County, West Virginia
- List of National Historic Landmarks in West Virginia
