= Elk River Coal and Lumber Company No. 10 =

Elk River Coal and Lumber Company #10
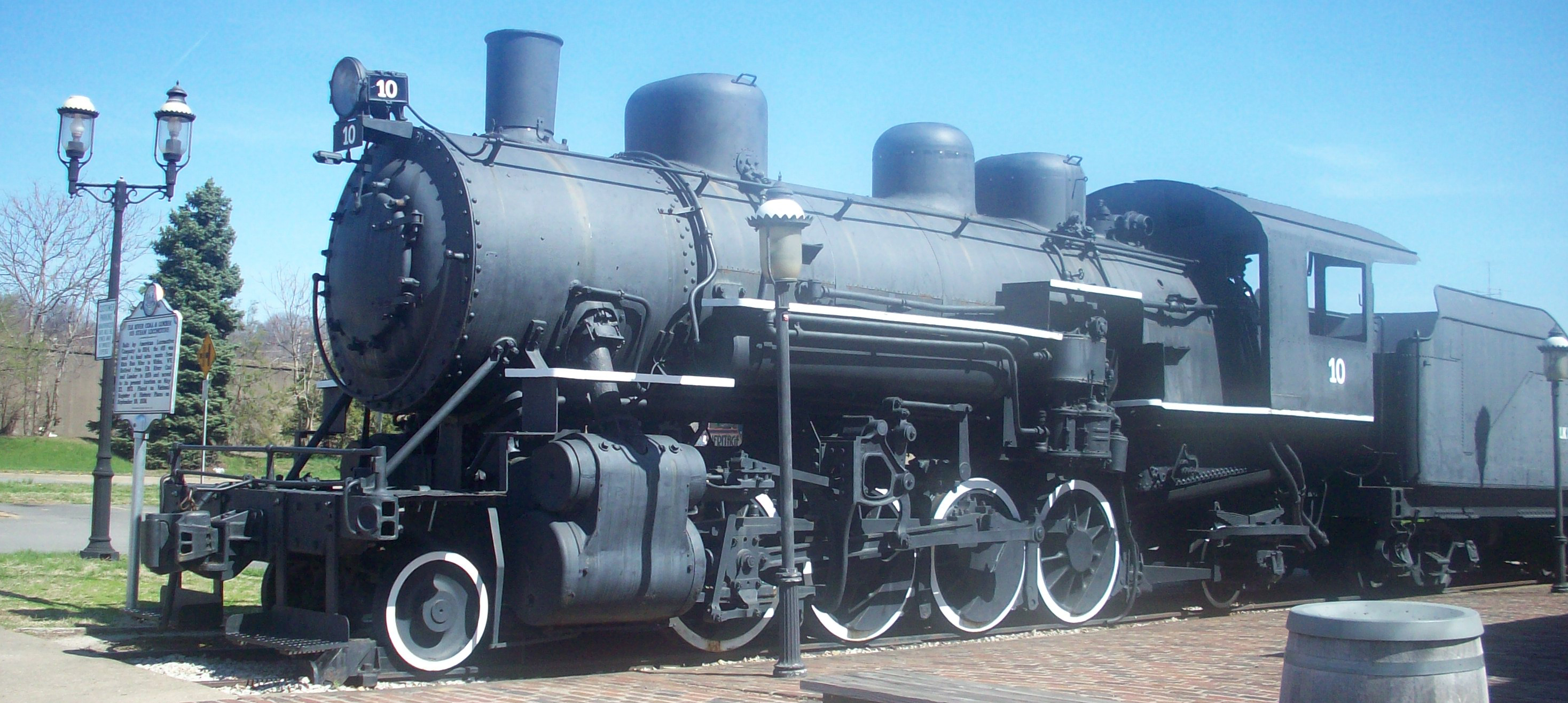
Type and origin
- Power type: Steam
- Builder: American Locomotive Company
- Serial number: 65430
- Build date: 1924
Specifications
- Configuration
  - Whyte: 2-8-2
  - UIC: 1′D1′
- Gauge: 4 ft 8 1/2 in (1,435 mm)
- Cylinders: Two, outside
- Valve gear: Baker
- Loco brake: Air
Career
- Operators: Toledo, Angola and Western » Elk River Coal and Lumber Company
- Disposition: Displayed
- Elk River Coal and Lumber Company #10 Steam Locomotive
- U.S. National Register of Historic Places
- Location within West Virginia Location within the United States
- Location: Jct. of Veteran's Memorial Blvd. and 11th St., Huntington, West Virginia
- Coordinates: 38°25′25.1″N 82°26′27.1″W
- Area: 0.1 acres (0.040 ha)
- Built: 1924
- Architect: American Locomotive Company
- Architectural style: 2-8-2 Class Locomotive
- NRHP reference No.: 06000901
- Added to NRHP: September 28, 2006

Elk River Coal and Lumber No. 10 is a 2-8-2, Mikado type steam locomotive built by American Locomotive Company in 1924 and used by its owners to haul mine waste from Rich Run Mine in Widen, West Virginia. It was retired in 1959 and moved to its present location at Huntington, West Virginia, in 1977.

It was built for the Toledo Angola and Western as their No. 100 in 1924. It was purchased sometime thereafter by Elk River Coal and Lumber Company.

It was added to the National Register of Historic Places as Elk River Coal and Lumber Company #10 Steam Locomotive in 2006.

== See also ==
- National Register of Historic Places listings in Cabell County, West Virginia
