= Simms School Building =

- U.S. National Register of Historic Places
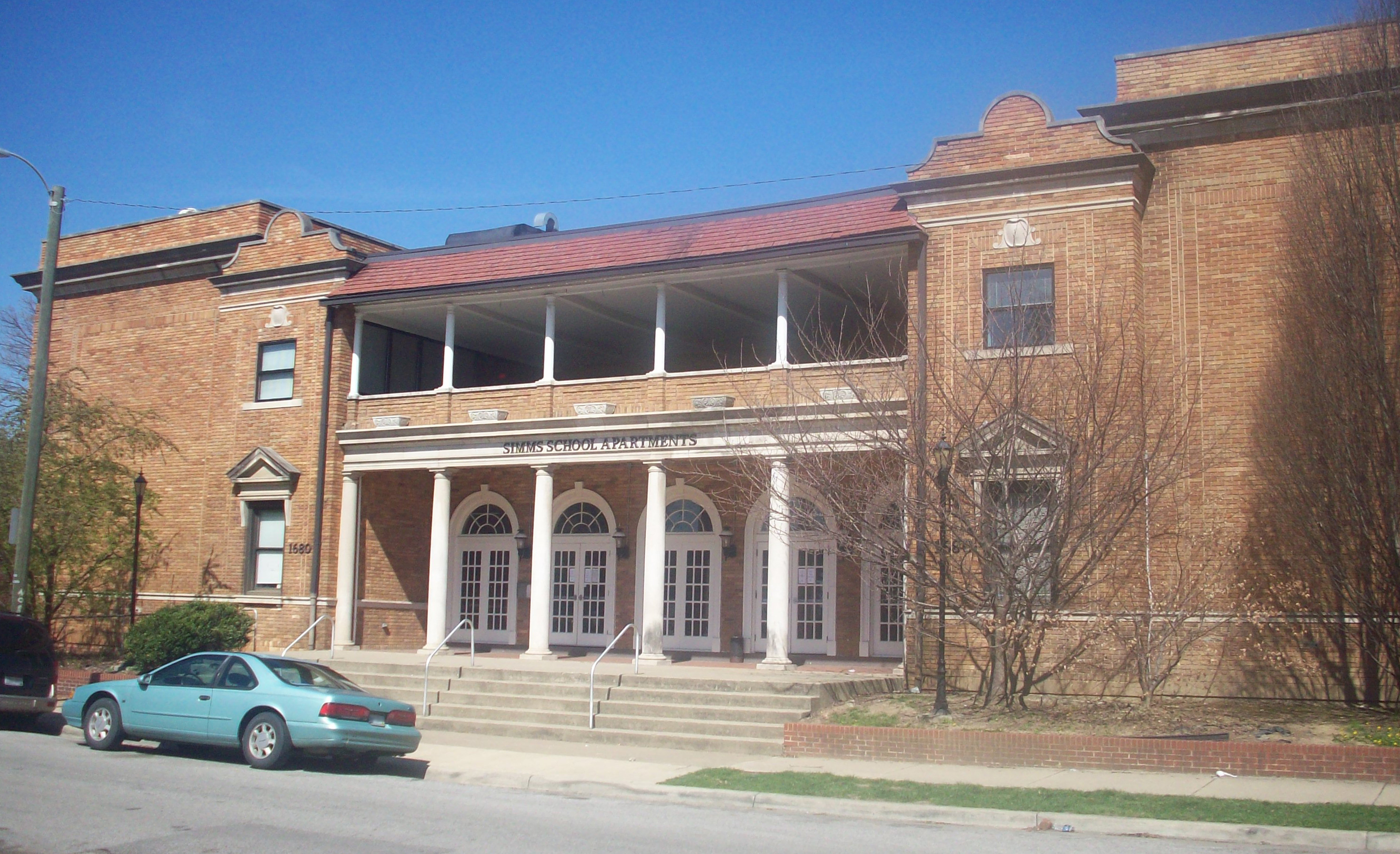
- Simms School, March 2009

- Location within West Virginia Location within the United States
- Location: 1680 11th Ave., Huntington, West Virginia
- Coordinates: 38°24′50″N 82°25′34″W
- Area: 0.6 acres (0.24 ha)
- Built: 1919
- Architectural style: Classical Revival
- NRHP reference No.: 96000438
- Added to NRHP: May 12, 1997

Simms School Building is a historic elementary school building located at Huntington, Cabell County, West Virginia. It was built in 1919–1920, and is a two-story wire brick, steel frame building in the Classical Revival style. It has a square plan, with a center auditorium surrounded by a circular corridor with classrooms on three sides. The front entrance has a center colonnade with four round limestone Doric order columns capped with a limestone frieze and projecting cornice. The second floor features an open porch with wood columns and a projecting cornice topped by a clay tile mansard roof. An addition was completed in 1964. The school closed after 1980, and it now houses 20 apartment units for the elderly.

It was listed on the National Register of Historic Places in 1997.

== See also ==
- National Register of Historic Places listings in Cabell County, West Virginia
