= Ohev Sholom Temple =

Conservative/Reform synagogue in West Virginia, US

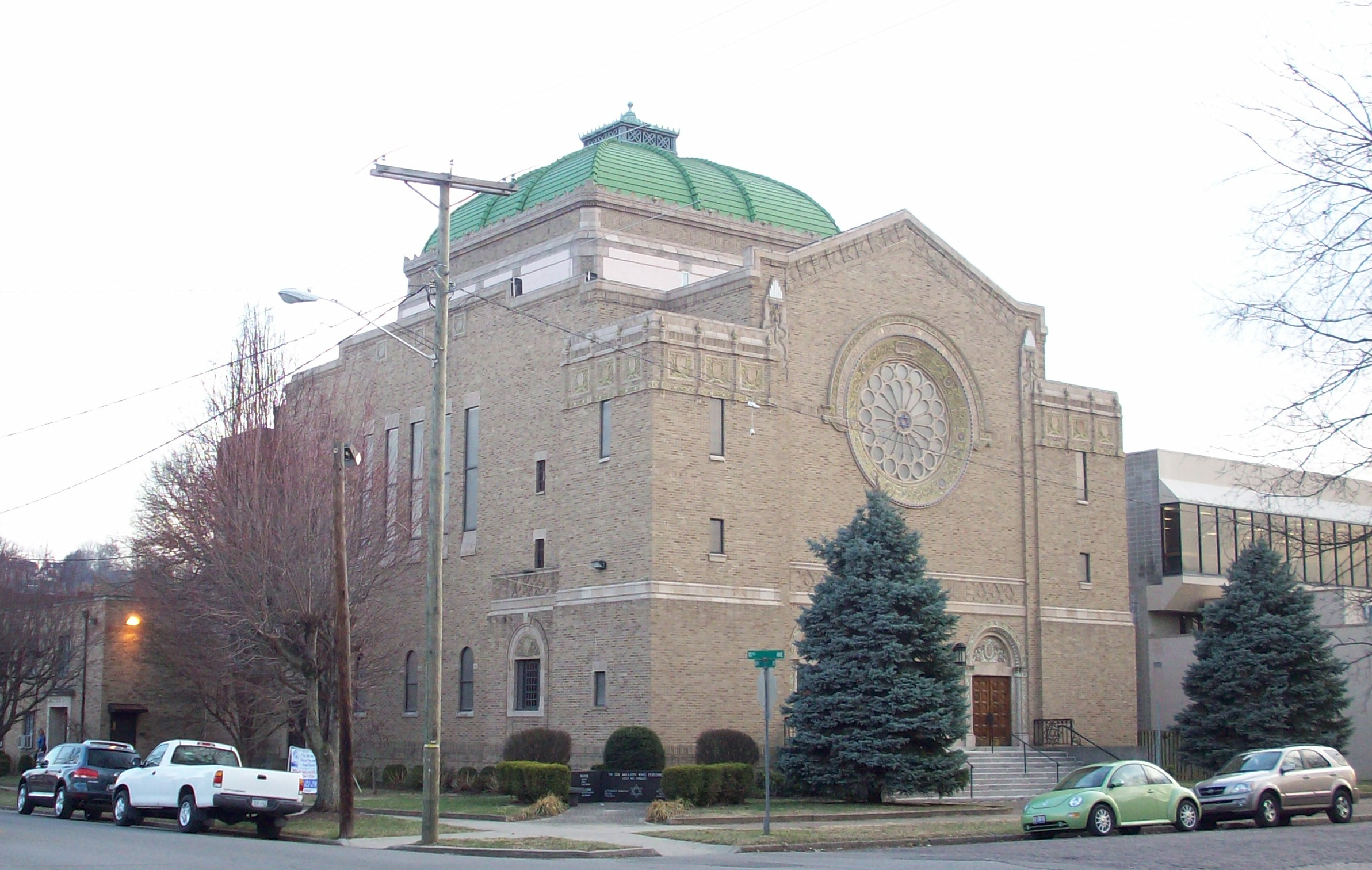

- Location in West Virginia

Religion
- Affiliation: Judaism
- Rite: Conservative Judaism; Reform Judaism
- Ecclesiastical or organizational status: Synagogue
- Leadership: Rabbi Robert D. Judd; Rabbi Dr David E. Wucher (Emeritus)
- Status: Active

Location
- Location: 949 10th Avenue, Huntington, Cabell County, West Virginia
- Country: United States
- Interactive map of Ohev Sholom Temple
- Coordinates: 38°24′44″N 82°26′24″W

Architecture
- Architect: Meanor & Handloser
- Type: Synagogue
- Style: Late 19th And 20th Century Revivals, Eclectic, Romanesque Revival, Byzantine Revival
- Established: 1887 (as a congregation)
- Completed: 1925

Website
- wv-bnaisholom.org
- Ohev Sholom Temple
- U.S. National Register of Historic Places
- Area: less than one acre
- NRHP reference No.: 94000211
- Added to NRHP: March 17, 1994

Ohev Sholom Temple, now known as B'Nai Sholom Congregation, is a historic synagogue located at 949 10th Avenue, in Huntington, Cabell County, West Virginia, in the United States.

Designed by the Charleston architectural firm of Meanor & Handloser in an eclectic, historicizing style that combined Neo-Romanesque and Neo-Byzantine features, it was built in 1925 for Congregation Ohev Shalom, which had formed in 1887. In 1978 B'Nai Sholom Congregation was formed by the merger of Ohev Shalom and B’nai Israel, an Orthodox synagogue which had been formed in 1910. On March 17, 1994, the building was added to the National Register of Historic Places. B'Nai Sholom continues today as an active congregation affiliated with both the Reform and Conservative streams of Judaism.

== See also ==
- National Register of Historic Places listings in Cabell County, West Virginia
