= Prichard House (Huntington, West Virginia) =

Historic house in West Virginia, United States

- U.S. National Register of Historic Places
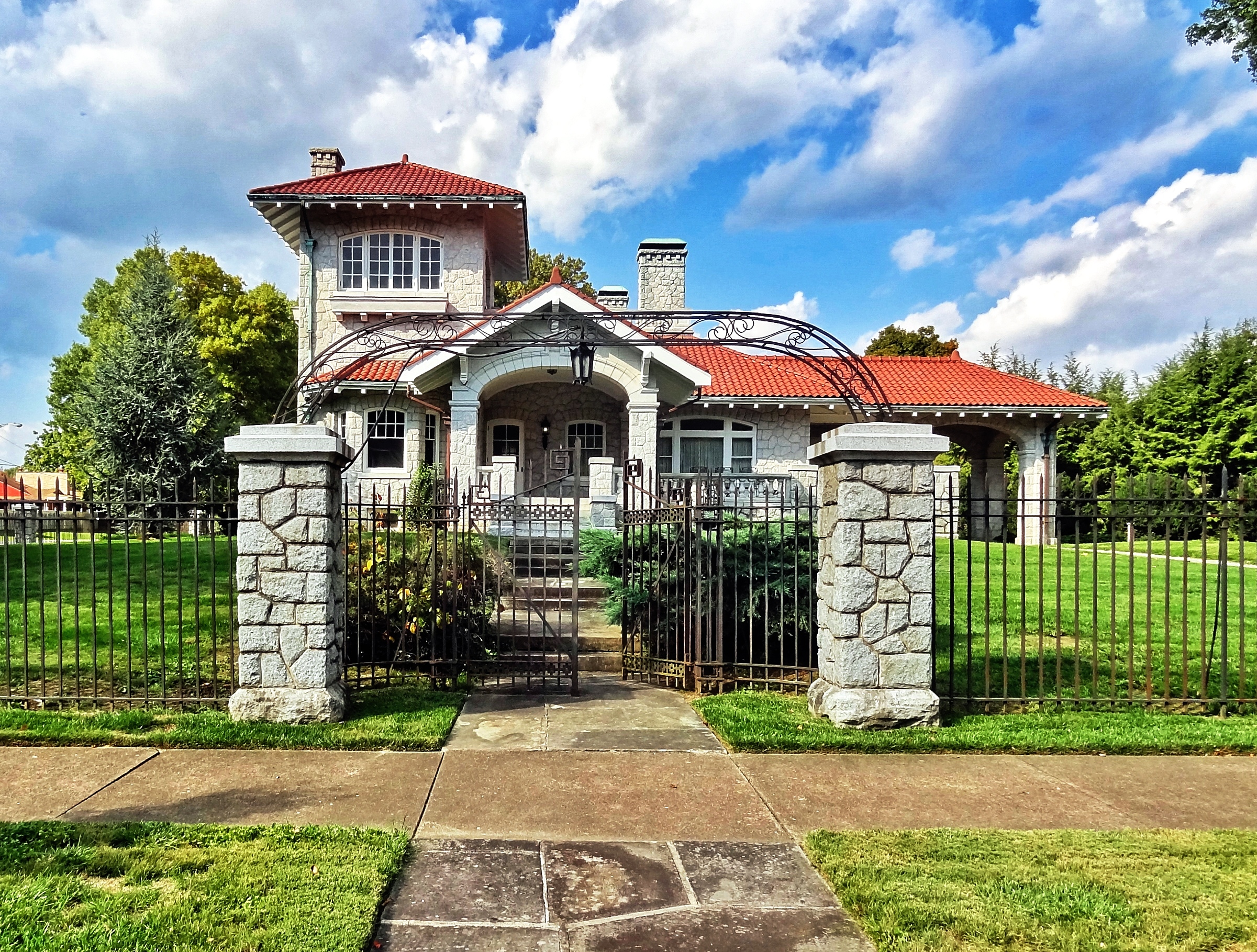
- Prichard House, October 2012

- Location within West Virginia Location within the United States
- Location: 500 Twelfth Ave., Huntington, West Virginia
- Coordinates: 38°24′31″N 82°26′51″W
- Area: less than one acre
- Built: 1921
- Architect: John J. West
- Architectural style: Late 19th And 20th Century Revivals, Italian Renaissance
- NRHP reference No.: 01000261
- Added to NRHP: March 12, 2001

Prichard House is a historic home located at Huntington, Cabell County, West Virginia. It was built between 1921 and 1923, and is an Italian Renaissance-style residence. The house is built of gray North Carolina granite, topped by a Spanish tile roof, and sits on a reinforced concrete foundation. It features a distinctive two story tower and two roof garden chimneys. At the entrance to the property is the original wrought iron fence supported by granite pillars and iron gates. Also on the property are complementary and contributing guesthouse / garage and chicken house.

It was listed on the National Register of Historic Places in 2001.

== See also ==
- National Register of Historic Places listings in Cabell County, West Virginia
