= Johnston-Meek House =

Historic house in West Virginia, United States

- U.S. National Register of Historic Places
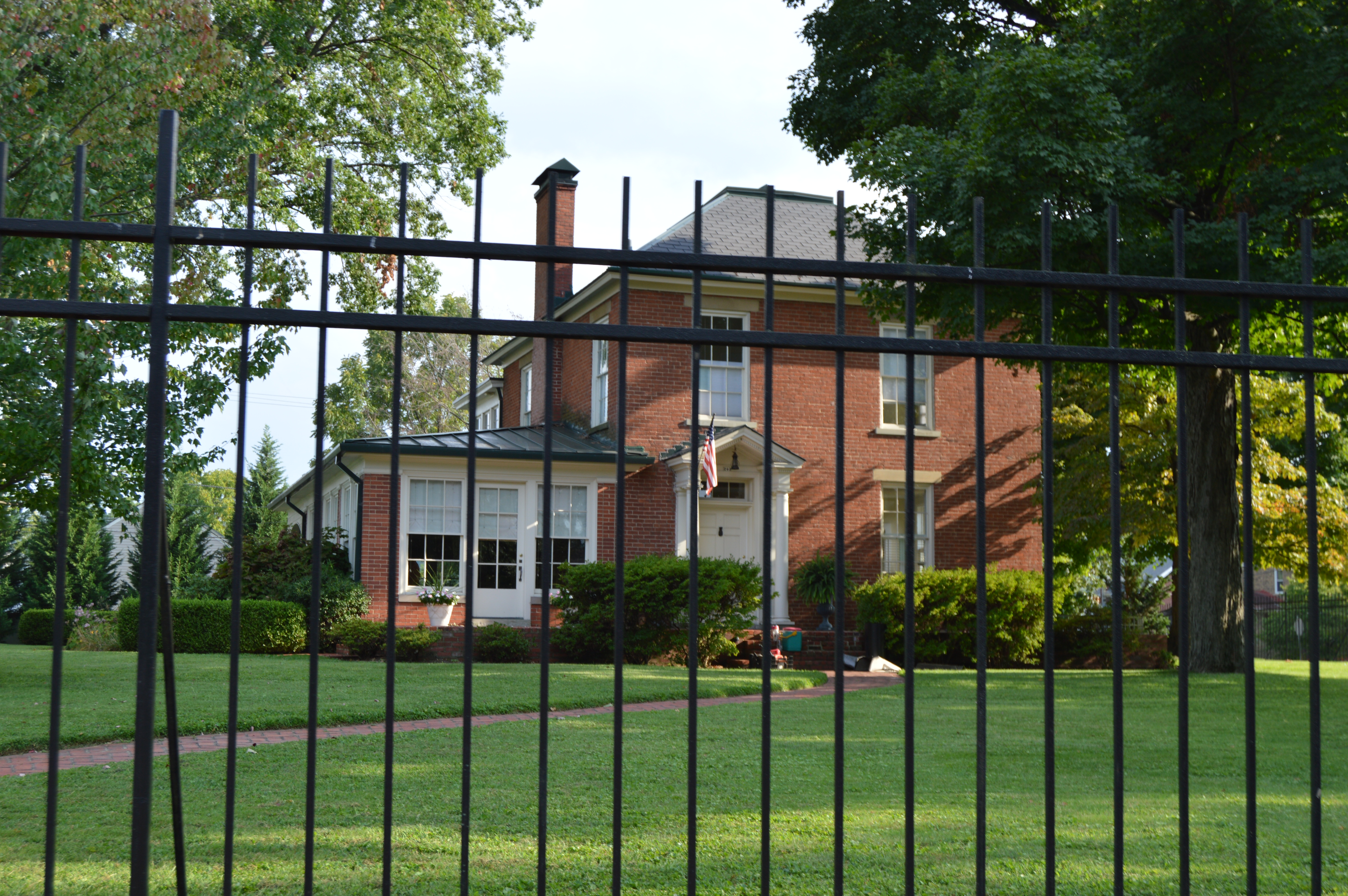
- Front of the house, situated behind a metal fence

- Location within West Virginia Location within the United States
- Location: 203 6th Ave., Huntington, West Virginia
- Coordinates: 38°24′55″N 82°27′16″W
- Area: less than one acre
- Built: 1832
- Architect: Day, Sidney L.
- Architectural style: Colonial Revival
- NRHP reference No.: 04000313
- Added to NRHP: April 14, 2004

Johnston-Meek House is a historic home located at Huntington, Cabell County, West Virginia. It is a two-story, brick Colonial Revival style dwelling with a hipped roof. The original section was built in 1832, with additions in 1838, 1923, and 1941. The 1923 Colonial Revival entrance portico and a number of other significant modifications were designed by local architect Sidney L. Day.

It was listed on the National Register of Historic Places in 2004.

== See also ==
- National Register of Historic Places listings in Cabell County, West Virginia
