= Carroll Building =

Carroll Building may refer to:

- A.R. Carroll Building, Canehill, Arkansas, listed on the National Register of Historic Places (NRHP)
- Carroll Building (Norwich, Connecticut), NRHP-listed
- Carroll Building (Apopka, Florida), NRHP-listed

== See also ==
- Carroll House (disambiguation)
- Carroll-Richardson Grist Mill, Cave Spring, Georgia, NRHP-listed
- John Carroll University North Quad Historic District, University Heights, Ohio, NRHP-listed
