= Ninth Street West Historic District =

Historic district in West Virginia, United States

- U.S. National Register of Historic Places
- U.S. Historic district
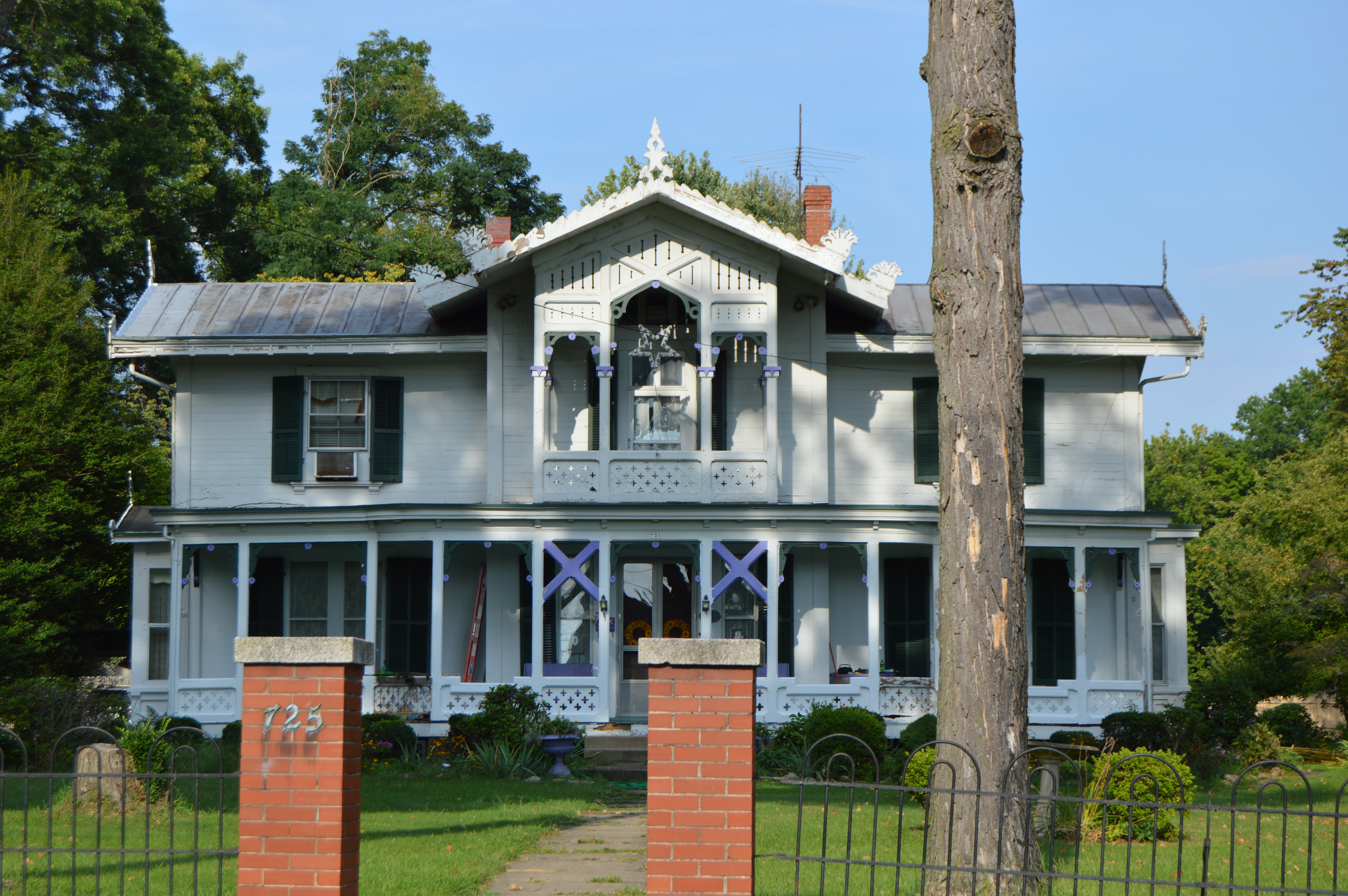
- The Parsons-Abbott-Mosser House, a pivotal part of the district

- Location within West Virginia Location within the United States
- Location: 9th St., Madison and Jefferson Aves., Huntington, West Virginia
- Coordinates: 38°24′44″N 82°28′14″W
- Area: 3.5 acres (1.4 ha)
- Built: 1874
- Architect: Multiple
- Architectural style: Late Victorian
- NRHP reference No.: 80004016
- Added to NRHP: November 28, 1980

Ninth Street West Historic District is a national historic district located at Huntington, Cabell County, West Virginia. The district encompasses 12 contributing buildings in the St. Cloud neighborhood in the western section of Huntington. It is a significant enclave of late 19th and early 20th century residences in the Late Victorian style, most notably Queen Anne. The period of development is from 1870 to 1933.

It was listed on the National Register of Historic Places in 1980.

== See also ==
- National Register of Historic Places listings in Cabell County, West Virginia
