= Buffalo Indian Village Site =

- U.S. National Register of Historic Places
- Nearest city: Buffalo, West Virginia
- Area: 52 acres (21 ha)
- NRHP reference No.: 71000883
- Added to NRHP: January 25, 1971

The Buffalo Indian Village Site is an archaeological site located near Buffalo, Putnam County, West Virginia, along the Kanawha River in the United States. This site sits atop a high terrace on the eastern bank of the Kanawha River and was once home to a variety of Native American villages including the Archaic, Middle Woodland and Fort Ancient cultures of this region. Buffalo Village was the site of one of the first systematic archaeological projects performed in West Virginia and it was added to the National Register of Historic Places in 1971.

At some point between the years 1640 and 1730, most of the territory between the Ohio Valley and Fort Ancient region of West Virginia, was abandoned. It is a possibility that nearby Iroquois Nations posed certain pressures regarding the fur trade that led to the abandonment of these sites. The introduction of European diseases may have been a possible factor as well, but the bigger details are largely unknown by researchers.

== Archaeological record ==
Archaeological excavations were performed between 1963 and 1965 by Dr. Edward McMichael of the West Virginia Geological and Economic Survey (WVGS). The earliest occupation of this site has a radiocarbon date of 1170/1275 CE and the later occupation has a radiocarbon date of 1651/1680 CE. These two Fort Ancient occupations consisted of two villages that nearly overlapped and contained over forty houses. The later village, where Dr. McMichael performed the majority of his excavations, has also been called the Downstream village.

Excavations of the Downstream village at this site found fire basins, hearths, earth ovens, refuse pits and storage pits. The Native Americans of this site lived in large, rectangular houses with rounded corners. The Buffalo site houses surrounded a central plaza within the log palisades. The houses were most often twenty feet wide by thirty feet long and the fire basins and fire hearths were usually found within the home.

During the excavations of the Buffalo Village site, 562 human burials were found, all but one of which were found at the Downstream village. Most people were buried in the floors of houses, while others were buried throughout the village in simple burial pits. One individual was placed in a stone box grave, indicating possible importance. Studies performed by James Metress found that, of the burial population, 41% were male and 59% were female. Thirteen of the individuals buried were found with non-local arrowheads embedded in them which suggests that warfare and non-local raids were occurring in this region. Many individuals at the Buffalo Village were buried with grave goods such as marine shell gorgets and pendants, pottery vessels, turtle shell cups and various other tools and ornaments. Some of these grave goods were made of European brass and copper which are materials that were likely traded with the Native Americans of this region.

The found buffalo mask and exotic marine shell gorgets give evidence of contact with the Late Mississippian culture. This Southern Cult or Chiefly Warfare Cult is similar to that of eastern Tennessee and north Georgia region. The earlier village yielded no pottery made with legs nor lizard effigy on the rims nor exotic crafted artifacts. Although, the pottery was shell-tempered and of late found to be worked with corn cob.

Maize, squash, and beans were grown in gardens around the village. Fort Ancient people were known to gather wilds nuts such as walnuts and hazelnuts and wild fruits like plums and cherries. People at the Buffalo Village utilized their location on the river and were able to hunt for fish and mussels. They also supplemented their diets by hunting with bows and arrows. White-tailed deer, black bears, squirrels and wild turkey are among the animals hunted and consumed by these Fort Ancient people.

The remains of small, domesticated dogs were located at this site. They were most likely used to help with hunting, protecting the village and, occasionally, for food.

The Buffalo Fort Ancient tradition site is of a phase with several likeness to the sites of the Clover complex. As with Clover, the type site was excavated by the Geological Survey of 1963. The Clover (46CB40), Buffalo (46PU31) and Rolf Lee (46Ms51) sites are suspected to be the same population rotating to each location dependent upon resource depletion.

== Material tradition ==
As with other phases within the contemporaneous 'tradition', local stream mussel shell was used for tools and jewelry. Animal bone and shell attached to prepared tree limbs were also used for hoes in their gardens. Animal bone was shaped for use as tools. These included awls, punches, fish hooks, bone needles and hide scrapers. Their jewelry included beads, hair pins, pendants, tinklers and shell gorgets. These were also made of both bone and shell. Gourds from their garden and turtle shell were used for ceremonial rattles.

== Buffalo Village today ==
In the early 1800's this area was obtained by Joab Early and his family and turned into farmland. Various development projects in and around Putnam County, West Virginia have led to the continued discovery of Native American remains and materials. There is currently a historical marker located along Route 62 near Buffalo, West Virginia that gives a short description of the Buffalo Indian Village Site and the excavations that occurred there.
