= Hawthorne Historic District =

Historic district in West Virginia, United States

- U.S. National Register of Historic Places
- U.S. Historic district
- Location within West Virginia Location within the United States
- Location: Roughly Hawthorne Way and portions of South, Whitaker Blvd., Huntington, West Virginia
- Coordinates: 38°24′22.44″N 82°26′38.58″W
- Area: 21 acres (8.5 ha)
- Architect: Handloser, Edward J.; Ritter, Verus T.
- Architectural style: Late 19th And 20th Century Revivals, Late 19th And Early 20th Century American Movements
- NRHP reference No.: 07000786
- Added to NRHP: August 2, 2007

Hawthorne Historic District is a national historic district located at Huntington, Cabell County, West Virginia. The district encompasses 24 contributing buildings and 1 contributing structure (stone retaining walls) in the Park Hills Subdivision No. 1. The district is composed entirely of early 20th century residences, the majority of which are Colonial Revival style.

It was listed on the National Register of Historic Places in 2007.

== See also ==
- National Register of Historic Places listings in Cabell County, West Virginia
