= Foster Memorial Home =

- U.S. National Register of Historic Places
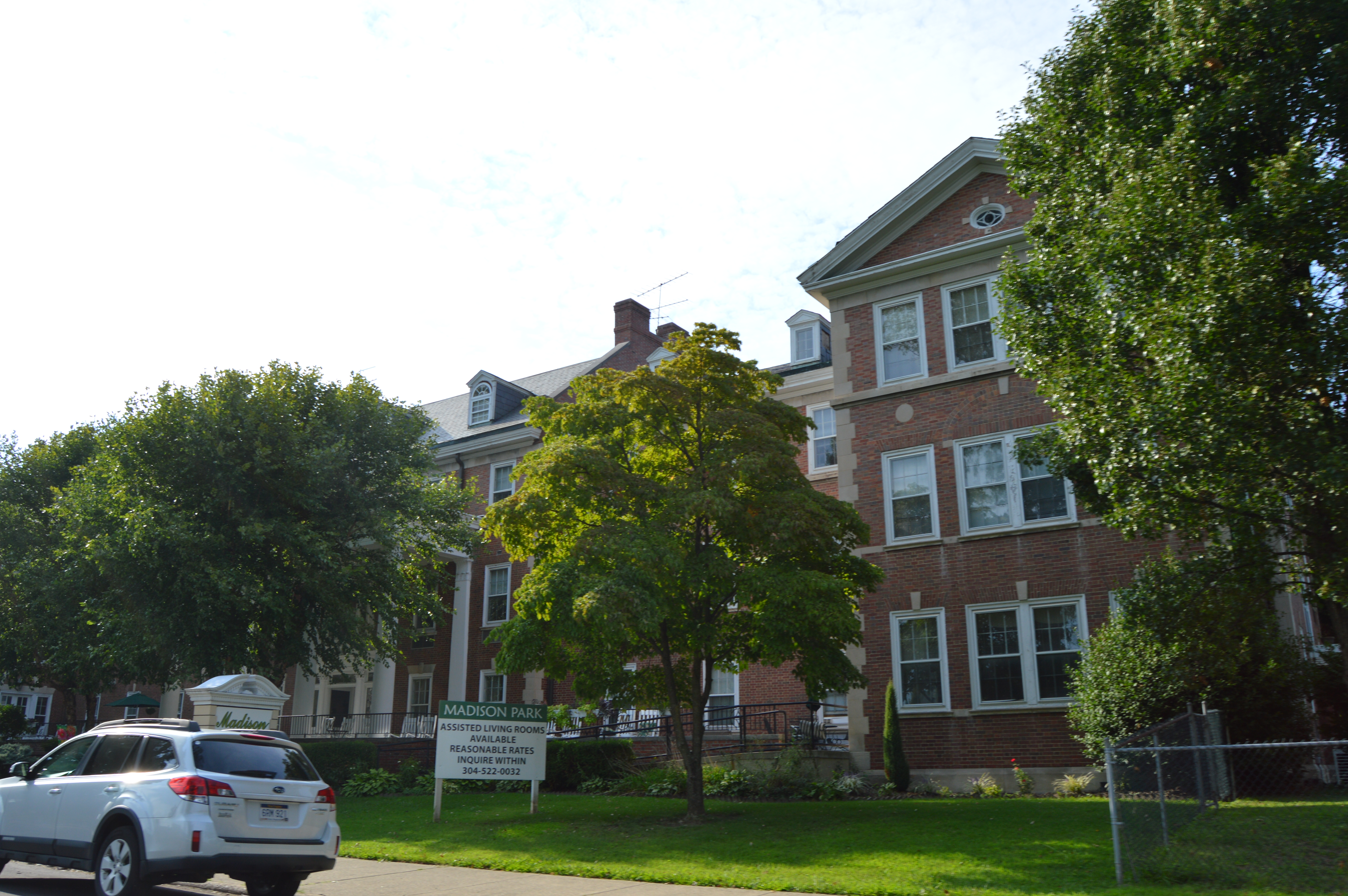
- Front of the home, seen slightly from the east

- Location within West Virginia Location within the United States
- Location: 700 Madison Ave., Huntington, West Virginia
- Coordinates: 38°24′46″N 82°28′0″W
- Area: 1.6 acres (0.65 ha)
- Built: 1924
- Architect: Day, R.L. & Sidney L.; Harer, C.W.
- Architectural style: Colonial Revival
- NRHP reference No.: 00001311
- Added to NRHP: February 27, 2001

Foster Memorial Home is a historic sanatorium located at Huntington, Cabell County, West Virginia. It was built in 1924 to serve as a home for elderly widows. It is a three-story, dark red brick building with limestone trim in the Colonial Revival style.

It was listed on the National Register of Historic Places in 2001.

== See also ==
- National Register of Historic Places listings in Cabell County, West Virginia
