= Bethel Memorial Park Cemetery =

Cemetery in Huntington, West Virginia, US

- U.S. National Register of Historic Places
- Location within West Virginia Location within the United States
- Location: 23 Bethel Rd, Huntington, West Virginia 25705
- Coordinates: 38°24′2″N 82°23′23″W
- Built: 1927
- NRHP reference No.: 100011743
- Added to NRHP: 2025

The Bethel Memorial Park Cemetery was established in 1927 and served as a burial ground for African American families during the era of segregation in Huntington, West Virginia. Over 800 individuals were interred at the cemetery, though only approximately 150 headstones remain today due to prolonged periods of neglect and limited financial resources. The final recorded burial took place in 1974.

It was listed on the National Register of Historic Places in 2025.

== See also ==
- National Register of Historic Places listings in Cabell County, West Virginia
