= Carroll–Hartshorn House =

Historic house in Massachusetts, United States

- U.S. National Register of Historic Places
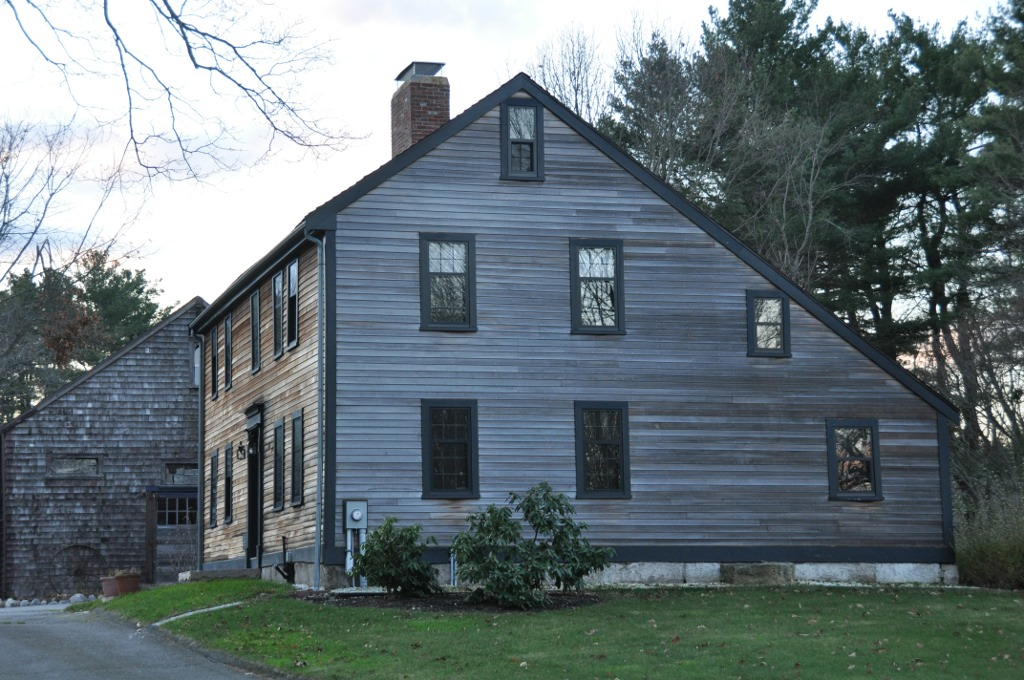

- Location within Massachusetts Location within the United States
- Location: Reading, Massachusetts
- Coordinates: 42°33′2″N 71°5′49″W
- Built: 1700
- MPS: Reading MRA
- NRHP reference No.: 84002532
- Added to NRHP: July 19, 1984

The Carroll–Hartshorn House is a historic First Period house at 572 Haverhill Street in Reading, Massachusetts. Built c. 1700, it is one of the oldest buildings in Reading, set on an early route between Wakefield and Haverhill. It has a classic two-story, five-bay, central-chimney plan, with a rear shed extension giving the house a saltbox appearance. Its windows, some still with original surrounds, are narrower and taller than typical for the period. The property was owned by generations of the Hartshorn family.

The house was listed on the National Register of Historic Places in 1984.

== See also ==
- National Register of Historic Places listings in Reading, Massachusetts
- National Register of Historic Places listings in Middlesex County, Massachusetts
