= Carroll Stagecoach Inn =

Historic inn in Missouri, U.S.

- Formerly listed on the U.S. National Register of Historic Places
- Location within Missouri Location within the United States
- Location: East of Oregon, near Oregon, Missouri
- Coordinates: 39°59′21″N 95°3′27″W
- Area: 2.5 acres (1.0 ha)
- Built: 1844, 1924
- Built by: Jessie Carroll
- NRHP reference No.: 83000993

Significant dates
- Added to NRHP: August 18, 1983
- Removed from NRHP: December 19, 1994

Carroll Stagecoach Inn, also known as Costello Farm, was a historic inn located near Oregon, Holt County, Missouri. It was built in 1844, and was a two-story rectangular building of wood framing built on a limestone foundation. It measured 35 feet by 17 feet and had a gable roof. An addition was made in 1924. Also on the property were the contributing pole barn (1844), sawmill, and the grave of Jesse Carroll.

It was listed on the National Register of Historic Places in 1983 and delisted in 1994.
