= Thomas Carroll House =

Historic house in West Virginia, United States

- U.S. National Register of Historic Places
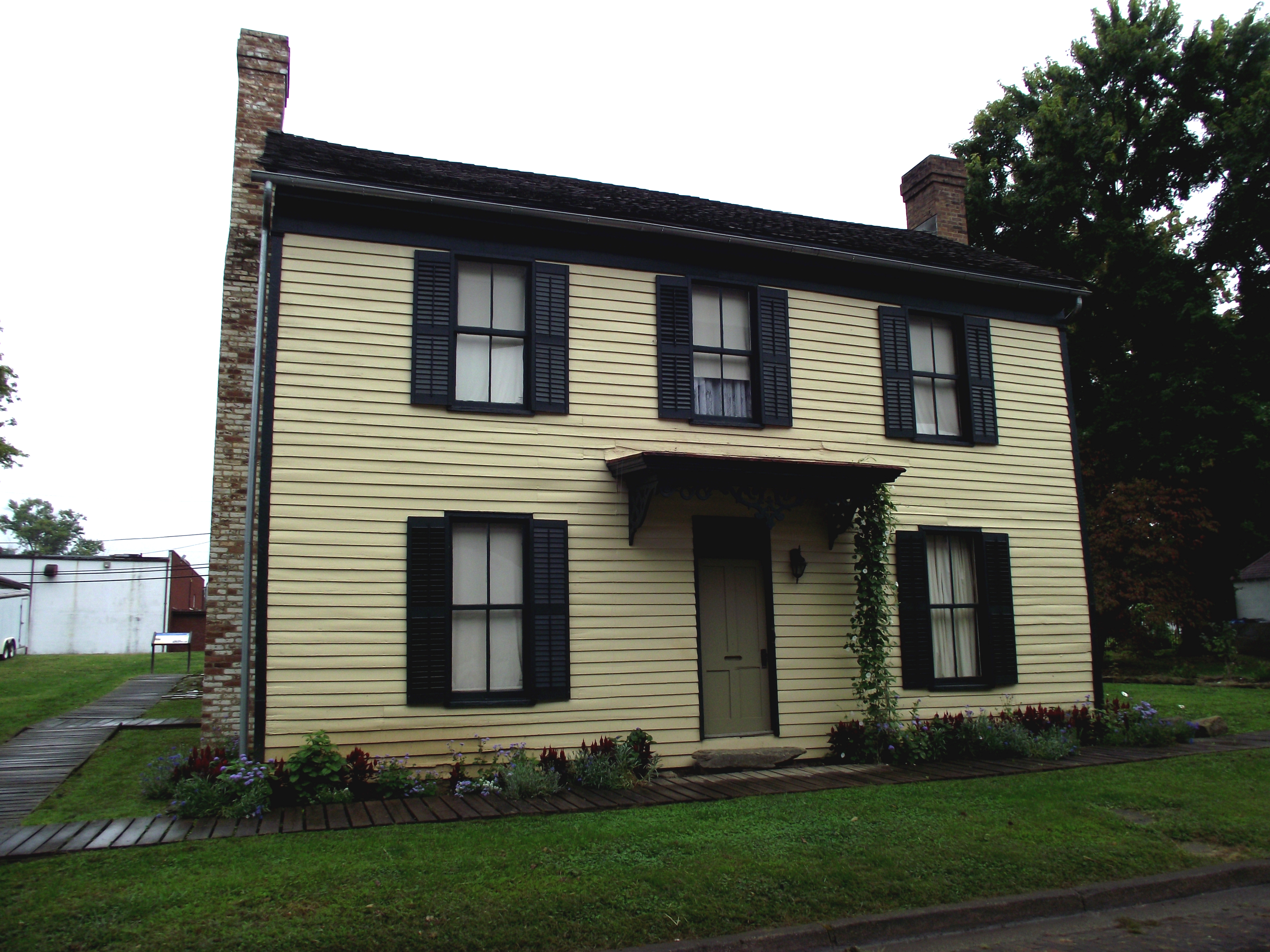
- Front of the house

- Location within West Virginia Location within the United States
- Location: 234 Guyan St., Huntington, West Virginia
- Coordinates: 38°25′44″N 82°23′24″W
- Area: 0.5 acres (0.20 ha)
- Built: 1810
- NRHP reference No.: 73001898
- Added to NRHP: June 01, 1973

The Thomas Carroll House, also known as the Madie Carroll House, is an historic home located in the Guyandotte neighborhood in the city of Huntington, Cabell County, West Virginia. It is also known as one of the oldest structures in Cabell County. The original section of the house was built prior to 1810, and is believed to have arrived in Guyandotte by flatboat from Gallipolis, Ohio. The property was purchased by Thomas Carroll in March 1855 and remained under the ownership of his descendants until it was deeded to the Greater Huntington Parks and Recreation District on October 10, 1984, after the last tenant, Miss Madie Carroll's demise. It is one of the few houses in Guyandotte to survive the Civil War and even once was a church, an inn, and a home to many. During the Civil War the house was a safe haven for Union soldiers which is a rich history that the Madie Carroll House Preservation Society has spent the last few decades protecting and educating many on. As of today the house is owned and operated by the Madie Carroll House Preservation Society where they hold several events such as their annual Guyandotte Civil War Days. It is open to the public as a museum. It was listed on the National Register of Historic Places in 1973.

== See also ==
- List of museums in Huntington, West Virginia
- National Register of Historic Places listings in Cabell County, West Virginia
