= Weisiger–Carroll House =

Historic house in Virginia, United States

- U.S. National Register of Historic Places
- Virginia Landmarks Register
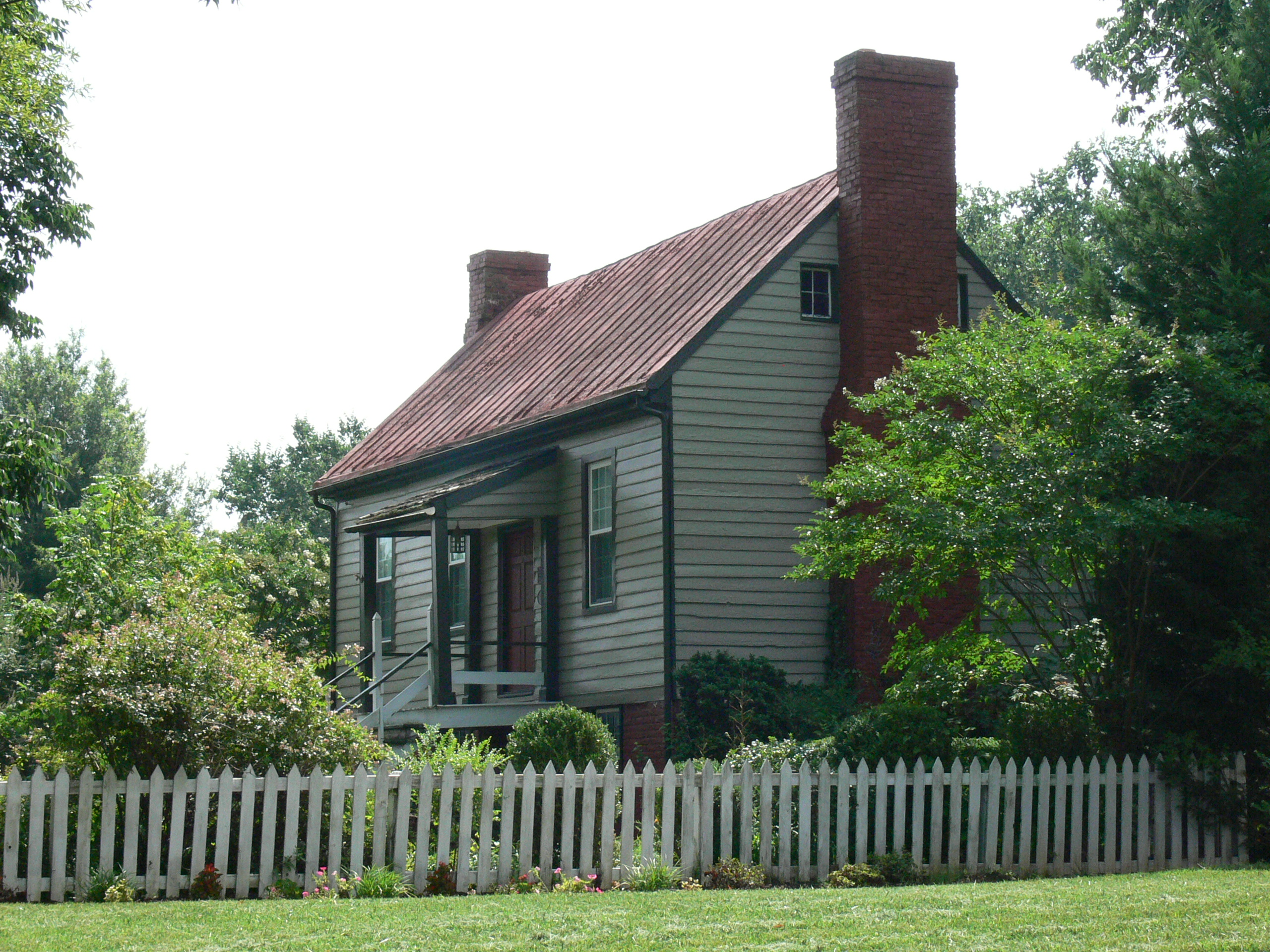
- Weisiger–Carroll House, July 2011

- Location within Virginia Location within the United States
- Location: 2408 Bainbridge St., Richmond, Virginia
- Coordinates: 37°30′59″N 77°27′20″W
- Area: less than one acre
- Built: 1800
- Architectural style: Federal
- NRHP reference No.: 94000454
- VLR No.: 127-0850

Significant dates
- Added to NRHP: May 19, 1994
- Designated VLR: March 10, 1994

Weisiger–Carroll House is a historic home located in Richmond, Virginia. It was built about 1765, and is a two-story, vernacular, frame dwelling. It sits on a high brick basement, has a gable roof, and exterior end chimneys. The interior features original woodwork and a Federal style mantel. The house served as a hospital during the American Civil War and more than 100 Confederate soldiers who died there lie buried in a cemetery behind the house. The house was restored in the 1980s.

It was listed on the National Register of Historic Places in 1994.
