= John M. Carroll House =

Historic house in the US state of Georgia

- U.S. National Register of Historic Places
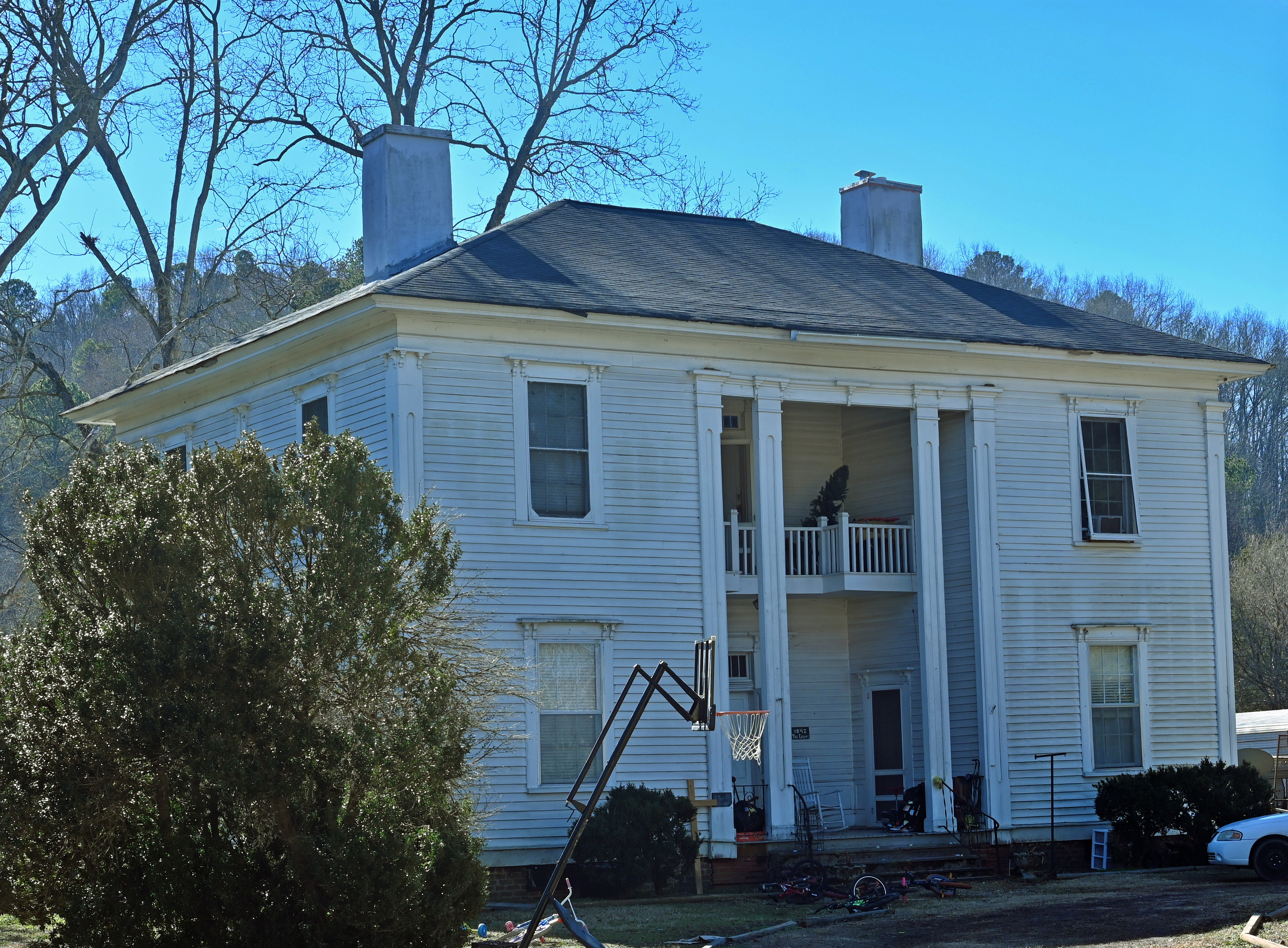

- Location within Georgia
- Location: Park St. Cave Spring, Georgia
- Coordinates: 34°06′09″N 85°20′23″W
- Area: 6 acres (2.4 ha)
- Architectural style: Mid 19th Century Eclectic
- MPS: Cave Spring MRA
- NRHP reference No.: 80001021
- Added to NRHP: June 19, 1980

The John M. Carroll House, at the end of Park St. in Cave Spring, Georgia, was listed on the National Register of Historic Places in 1980.

It was deemed significant "for its highly original eclectic design. The basic form and arrangement reflect Georgian traditions, the recessed front porch and entry reflects transitional Federal/Greek Revival styles, and details such as .paneled pilasters and paired brackets suggest Italianate influence. Although this sort of stylistic amalgamation is characteristic of the period, in this instance it is more likely the result of small-town building practices mixing tradition, pattern books, and the latest fashions."

It is also significant for association with the Carroll-Richardson Gristmill, as home of one of its founders.
