= Karsner-Carroll House =

- U.S. National Register of Historic Places
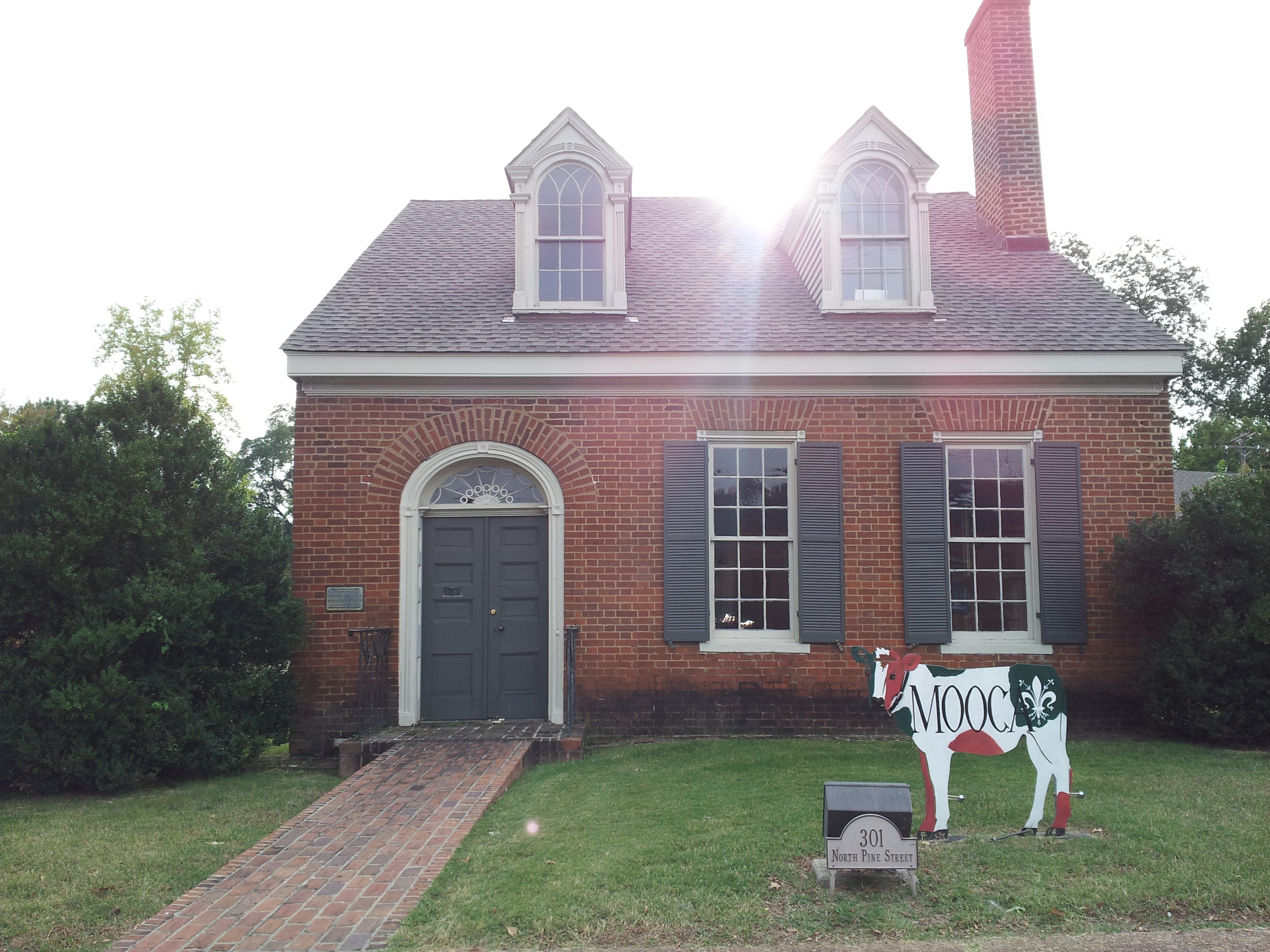
- The house in 2012

- Location within Alabama Location within the United States
- Location: 303 N. Pine St., Florence, Alabama
- Coordinates: 34°48′5″N 87°40′43″W
- Area: 0.5 acres (0.20 ha)
- Built: c. 1830
- Architectural style: Federal
- NRHP reference No.: 70000104
- Added to NRHP: March 31, 1970

The Karsner-Carroll House (also known as the Oscar Kennedy House) is a historic residence in Florence, Alabama. The lot on which the house sits was purchased in 1818 by James Gadsden; the lot to the west was purchased by his commanding officer in the War of 1812, Andrew Jackson. The house was built sometime before 1830 by B. F. Karsner. In 1902 it was purchased by Dr. George W. Carroll, whose daughter Bertha later lived in the house with her husband Oscar Y. Kennedy.

The house is a rare example of small-form, early 19th-century Federal architecture in the Tennessee Valley. The 1 1/2-story cottage is built with 13-inch (33-cm) thick brick exterior walls. On the three-bay façade, the entry door with fanlight occupies the left side, with two large six-over-six sash windows to the right. A pair of arched dormers project from the steeply pitched gable roof. The main block of the house is square, with a covered porch occupying the area behind the entry hall. Two rooms on the other side of the house lead to a narrow wing, containing three rooms, off the rear of the house. A smokehouse still stands behind the house.

The house was listed on the National Register of Historic Places in 1970.
