= Lesage, West Virginia =

- Census-designated place (CDP)
- Location in Cabell County and the state of West Virginia.
- Coordinates: 38°30′23″N 82°17′55″W
- Country: United States
- State: West Virginia
- County: Cabell

Area
  - Total: 7.234 sq mi (18.74 km^{2})
  - Land: 6.095 sq mi (15.79 km^{2})
  - Water: 1.139 sq mi (2.95 km^{2})

Population (2020)
  - Total: 1,290
  - Density: 212/sq mi (81.7/km^{2})
- Time zone: UTC-5 (Eastern (EST))
  - Summer (DST): UTC-4 (EDT)

Lesage is a census-designated place (CDP) on Ohio River Road in Cabell County, West Virginia, United States. As of the 2020 census, its population was 1,290 (down from 1,358 at the 2010 census). It is the nearest community to the Clover site, a National Historic Landmark.

Lesage is a part of the Huntington-Ashland Metropolitan Statistical Area (MSA). As of the 2010 census, the MSA had a population of 287,702. New definitions from February 28, 2013, placed the population at 363,000.

The community was named after Jules F. M. LeSage, an early settler.

== Points of Interest ==
- Hillbilly Hot Dogs, a roadside hot dog stand and tourist attraction
