= Altizer =

Altizer may refer to:

== Places ==
- Altizer, Huntington, West Virginia

== Surname ==
- Dave Altizer (1876–1964), American Major League Baseball player
- Rick Altizer, director, musician, and songwriter
- Sonia Altizer (born 1970), American ecologist
- Thomas J. J. Altizer (1927–2018), American theologian who postulated in the early 1960s the "death of God"
- Andrew R. Altizer (1987 - ), American military member and real estate investor

== Middle name ==
- Ruby Altizer Roberts (1907–2004), American poet
