= Enslow Park Place, Huntington, West Virginia =

Neighborhood in West Virginia, US

Enslow Park Place, West Virginia
- Unincorporated community
- Location within the state of West Virginia Enslow Park Place (the United States)
- Coordinates: 38°24′15.30″N 82°25′59.55″W
- Country: United States
- State: West Virginia
- County: Cabell
- City: Huntington
- Elevation: 627 ft (191 m)
- Time zone: UTC-5 (Eastern (EST))
  - Summer (DST): UTC-4 (EDT)
- ZIP codes: 25701
- GNIS ID: 1740352

Enslow Park Place, also known as Enslow Park, is an unincorporated community in Huntington, Cabell County, West Virginia, United States.

== Notable people ==
- Chris Perkins, former Member of the U.S. House of Representatives, former pastor of Enslow Park Presbyterian Church

== See also ==
- List of neighborhoods in Huntington, West Virginia
