= West Huntington, Huntington, West Virginia =

West Huntington, West Virginia
- Unincorporated community
- Location within the state of West Virginia West Huntington (the United States)
- Coordinates: 38°24′38.30″N 82°29′1.56″W
- Country: United States
- State: West Virginia
- County: Cabell
- City: Huntington
- Elevation: 561 ft (171 m)
- Time zone: UTC-5 (Eastern (EST))
  - Summer (DST): UTC-4 (EDT)
- ZIP codes: 25701
- GNIS ID: 1555945

West Huntington is an unincorporated community in Huntington, Cabell County, West Virginia, United States. West Huntington is sometimes referred to as the "West End" or the "Stend," a portmanteau blending the words West End into one.

== Points of Interest ==
- Huntington Children's Museum, a children's activity museum, features dozens of interactive activity exhibits, located west of the West Huntington Bridge.
- St. Cloud Commons, a park including a softball field, a community center, and the first all-inclusive park in West Virginia
- West Huntington Bridge, a bridge connecting Huntington and Burlington, Ohio. It crosses the Ohio River and carries U.S. Route 52 between Ohio State Route 7 and Interstate 64.

== See also ==
- List of neighborhoods in Huntington, West Virginia
