= Freeman Estates, Huntington, West Virginia =

Unincorporated community in West Virginia, United States

Freeman Estates, West Virginia
- Unincorporated community

- Location within the state of West Virginia Freeman Estates (the United States)
- Coordinates: 38°23′37.30″N 82°25′56.55″W
- Country: United States
- State: West Virginia
- County: Cabell
- City: Huntington
- Elevation: 883 ft (269 m)
- Time zone: UTC-5 (Eastern (EST))
  - Summer (DST): UTC-4 (EDT)
- ZIP codes: 25701
- GNIS ID: 1740355

Freeman Estates is an unincorporated community in Huntington, Cabell County, West Virginia, United States.

== Points of interest ==
- Freeman Estate, an estate house was built between 1912 and 1914 and is a 2+1/2-story, masonry American Craftsman-style dwelling.

== See also ==
- List of neighborhoods in Huntington, West Virginia
