= Harveytown, Huntington, West Virginia =

Harveytown, West Virginia
- Unincorporated community
- Location within the state of West Virginia Harveytown (the United States)
- Coordinates: 38°23′55.30″N 82°28′7.56″W
- Country: United States
- State: West Virginia
- County: Cabell
- City: Huntington
- Elevation: 548 ft (167 m)
- Time zone: UTC-5 (Eastern (EST))
  - Summer (DST): UTC-4 (EDT)
- ZIP codes: 25701
- GNIS ID: 1540049

Harveytown is an unincorporated community in Huntington, Cabell County, West Virginia, United States.

== Points of Interest ==
- Harveytown Park, a playground that features six picnic tables, one of which is handicap accessible, an electrical outlet, a grill, water fountain, and restrooms
- Heritage Farm Museum and Village, a seven-museum campus that covers the expansion and culture of Appalachia
- Museum of Radio and Technology, a museum that covers the birth and growth of electronic communication and entertainment

== See also ==
- List of neighborhoods in Huntington, West Virginia
