= Beverly Hills, Huntington, West Virginia =

Unincorporated community in West Virginia, United States

Beverly Hills, West Virginia
- Unincorporated community
- Location within the state of West Virginia Beverly Hills (the United States)
- Coordinates: 38°24′8.30″N 82°24′7.55″W
- Country: United States
- State: West Virginia
- County: Cabell
- City: Huntington
- Elevation: 663 ft (202 m)
- Time zone: UTC-5 (Eastern (EST))
  - Summer (DST): UTC-4 (EDT)
- ZIP codes: 25701
- GNIS ID: 1740343, 1553885

Beverly Hills, also known as South Hills, is an unincorporated community in Huntington, Cabell County, West Virginia, United States.

== Notable people ==
- Darnell Wright, American football player, played youth football for the Beverly Hills Youth Football League.

== See also ==
- List of neighborhoods in Huntington, West Virginia
