= Grandview Heights, Huntington, West Virginia =

Grandview Heights, West Virginia
- Unincorporated community
- Location within the state of West Virginia Grandview Heights (the United States)
- Coordinates: 38°23′42.30″N 82°22′49.54″W
- Country: United States
- State: West Virginia
- County: Cabell
- City: Huntington
- Elevation: 804 ft (245 m)
- Time zone: UTC-5 (Eastern (EST))
  - Summer (DST): UTC-4 (EDT)
- ZIP codes: 25701
- GNIS ID: 1740358

Grandview Heights is an unincorporated community in Huntington, Cabell County, West Virginia, United States.

== See also ==
- List of neighborhoods in Huntington, West Virginia
