= Freeman Estate =

Historic house in West Virginia, United States

- U.S. National Register of Historic Places
- Location within West Virginia Location within the United States
- Location: 1805 McCoy Rd., Huntington, West Virginia
- Coordinates: 38°24′1.84″N 82°26′9.65″W
- Area: 42 acres (17 ha)
- Built: 1914
- Architect: Ritter, Verus T.
- Architectural style: Bungalow/craftsman
- NRHP reference No.: 09000243
- Added to NRHP: April 23, 2009

Freeman Estate, also known as Park Hill Farm, is a historic home located at Freeman Estates, Huntington, Cabell County, West Virginia. The estate house was built between 1912 and 1914 and is a 2 1/2-story, masonry American Craftsman-style dwelling. It measures 11,000-square-foot (1,000 m^{2}) and has a red, clay tile roof.

It features a front porch floored with red quarry tile that extends approximately 80 feet (24 m) across the entire front of the home and wraps around its left side. Also, the property has a contributing stone wall and cobblestone path dated to the construction of the house.

It was listed on the National Register of Historic Places in 2009.

== See also ==
- National Register of Historic Places listings in Cabell County, West Virginia
