= Darnell Wright =

American football player (born 2001)

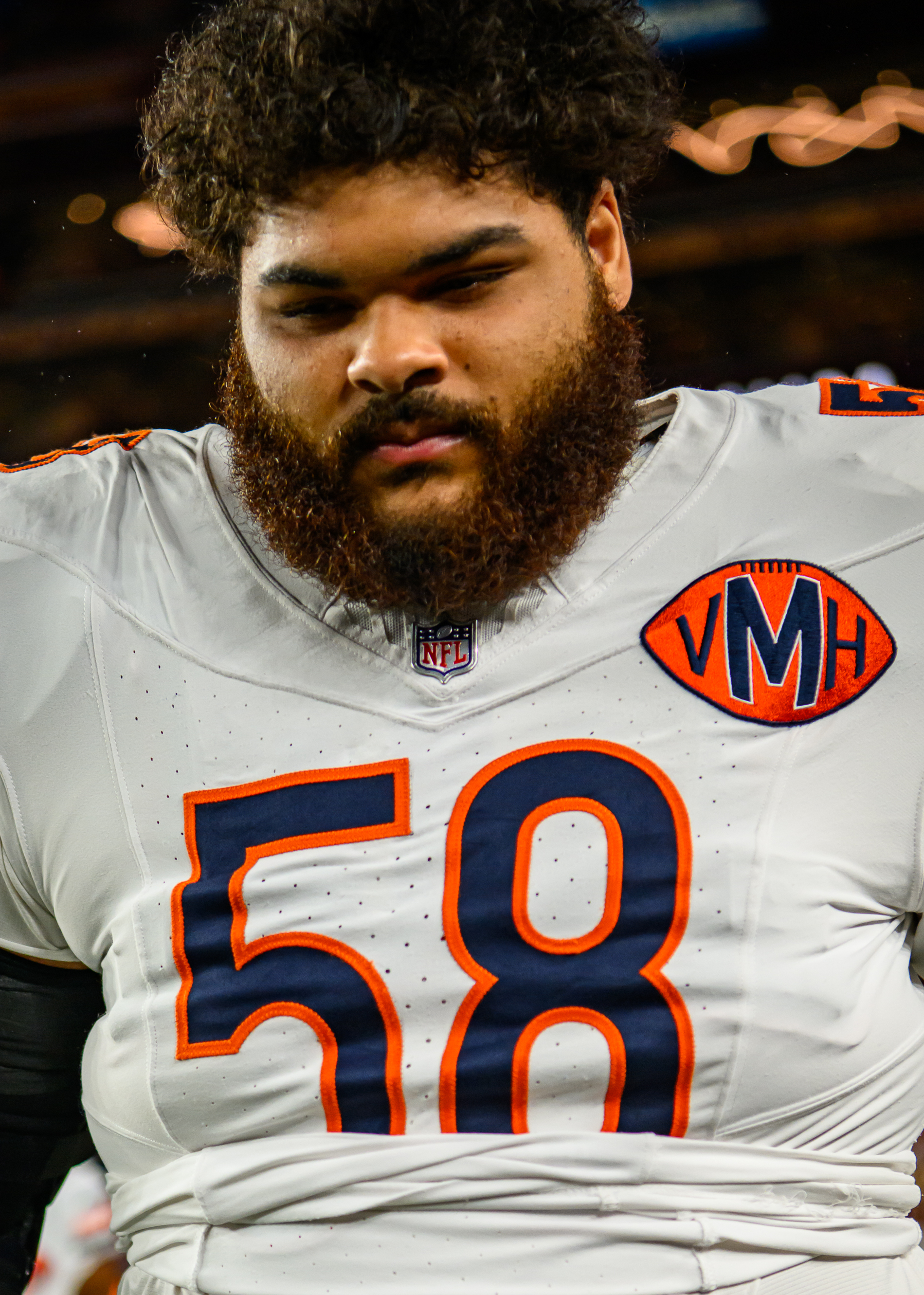
- Wright in 2025

No. 58 – Chicago Bears
- Position: Offensive tackle
- Roster status: Active

Personal information
- Born: August 10, 2001 (age 25); Huntington, West Virginia, U.S.
- Listed height: 6 ft 5 in (1.96 m)
- Listed weight: 325 lb (147 kg)

Career information
- High school: Huntington
- College: Tennessee (2019–2022)
- NFL draft: 2023: 1st round, 10th overall pick

Career history
- Chicago Bears (2023–present)

Awards and highlights
- Second-team All-Pro (2025); High School Under Armour All-American (2018); First-team Freshmen All-SEC (2019); First-team All-SEC (2022); PFWA All-Rookie Team (2023)

Career NFL statistics as of Week 7, 2026
- Games started: 56
- Games played: 56
- Stats at Pro Football Reference

Darnell Marquies Wright (born August 10, 2001) is an American professional football offensive tackle for the Chicago Bears of the National Football League (NFL). He played college football for the Tennessee Volunteers and was selected by the Bears tenth overall in the 2023 NFL draft.

== Early life ==
Wright was born on August 10, 2001, in Huntington, West Virginia. In his first years of football, Wright played in the Beverly Hills Youth Football League. He attended Huntington High School where he participated in track & field, football, and basketball. Wright won the 2017 Class AAA State Basketball Championship playing for Huntington High, and won the state title for shot-put in 2018. He was selected his sophomore year for the 2016 Class AAA Football All-State Second Offensive Team, and selected for the 2017 and 2018 Class AAA Football All-State First Offensive Teams. He was named to the roster for the 2019 Under Armour All-America Game. A five-star recruit, Wright committed to play college football at the University of Tennessee.

== College career ==
As a freshman in 2019, Wright played in 11 games and recorded seven starts. He was named to the 2019 Southeastern Conference (SEC) All-Freshman Team as a result. Wright made nine starts in 2020 and 13 in 2021. Entering the 2022 season, Wright was projected as a top prospect in the 2023 NFL draft. He was named first-team All-SEC for his performance in the 2022 season. Wright played 2,746 offensive snaps in 47 games (42 starts) - 27 at right tackle, two at right guard and 13 at left tackle for the Volunteers. He participated in the 2023 Senior Bowl, representing the American Team under his future NFL offensive coordinator Luke Getsy.

== Professional career ==
Pre-draft measurables
Height	Weight	Arm length	Hand span	Wingspan	40-yard dash	10-yard split	20-yard split	20-yard shuttle	Vertical jump	Broad jump
6 ft 5 3/8 in (1.97 m)	333 lb (151 kg)	33 3/4 in (0.86 m)	9 in (0.23 m)	6 ft 10 in (2.08 m)	5.01 s	1.81 s	2.90 s	4.72 s	29.0 in (0.74 m)	9 ft 6 in (2.90 m)
All values from NFL Combine/Pro Day

Wright was selected by the Chicago Bears in the first round as the tenth overall pick in the 2023 NFL draft. The pick reunited him with Getsy, who commended Wright's "respect for the position and the guys that he's trying to emulate" during their Senior Bowl meetings.

As a rookie, Wright started in all 17 games. He had 1,133 snaps played, 7 penalties, 7 sacks allowed, 3 hits, 41 hurries, 51 pressures and was named in the Top 5 Most Impactful Bears of 2023 by USA Today Sports. Wright was additionally selected for the 2023 NFL All-Rookie Team. In the 2024 season, he appeared in and started 16 games.

After the Bears brought in a new coaching staff under Ben Johnson in 2025, Wright was the only starting offensive lineman from the previous year to return. He and his new teammates helped the Bears reduce their sacks allowed from 68 in 2024 to 24 and have one of the top-ranked rushing offenses in the league. Despite playing much of the year with a torn UCL, he allowed just three sacks and 19 pressures. Wright was named second-team All-Pro for 2025.

On April 20, 2026, the Bears exercised the fifth-year option on Wright's contract. On August 4, Wright and the Bears agreed to a four-year, $116 million contract extension, with $93 million guaranteed, making it the largest amount of guaranteed money ever for an offensive lineman.

=== Statistics ===
Legend
**Bold**	Career high

Year	Team	Games		Offense					
Year	Team	GP	GS	Snaps	Pct	Holding	False Start	Decl/Pen	Acpt/Pen
2023	CHI	**17**	**17**	**1,133**	**100%**	**5**	**5**	1	11
2024	CHI	16	16	1,022	95%	0	5	**2**	7
2025	CHI	16	16	1,074	99%	**5**	4	0	**12**
2026	CHI	7	7	529	100%	1	2	0	3
Career		56	56	3,758	—	11	16	3	33
