= Safety Town (Huntington, West Virginia) =

- Established: 1975; 51 years ago
- Location: 1450 Memorial Blvd, Huntington, West Virginia 25701
- Coordinates: 38°24′15.084″N 82°28′45.84″W
- Type: Children Activity Museum
- Executive director: Vanessa C Hankins
- Owner: City of Huntington
- Website: Official Website

Safety Town is a children activity museum, located next to the Huntington Railroad Museum in Huntington, West Virginia. The museum focuses on road safety and transportation safety.

In the early 1970s, the Safety Town program was established by Miller Elementary School. After five years, in 1975, Huntington purchased property near Old Central City to extend the program. After opening, the museum's campus resembles a small town including a barn, gas station, church, post office, houses, and a school building.

== Popular culture ==
The My Brother, My Brother And Me podcast, including Justin McElroy, Travis McElroy, and Griffin McElroy, went to safety town with Stephen T. Williams, the mayor of Huntington, West Virginia.

== See also ==
- List of museums in Huntington, West Virginia
- Safety Town
