= Huntington Railroad Museum (Huntington, West Virginia) =

Railroad and train museum

- Established: 1959; 67 years ago
- Location: Memorial Blvd and 14th Street West, Huntington, West Virginia 25704
- Coordinates: 38°24′18.5904″N 82°28′38.1972″W
- Type: Railroad and Train
- Owner: Collis P. Huntington Railroad Historical Society

Huntington Railroad Museum is a railroad and train museum, located next to the Safety Town in Huntington, West Virginia. Established in 1959, the museum has multiple exhibits of other rail vehicles and Collis P. Huntington. It was previously home to Chesapeake and Ohio 1308 until 2025, when the locomotive was acquired by the Age of Steam Roundhouse.

== Collis P. Huntington Railroad Historical Society ==
The Collis P. Huntington Railroad Historical Society, a chapter of National Railway Historical Society, is headquartered at the Huntington Railroad Museum.

== See also ==
- List of museums in Huntington, West Virginia
