= Altizer, Huntington, West Virginia =

Unincorporated community in West Virginia, United States

Altizer, West Virginia
- Unincorporated community
- Location within the state of West Virginia Altizer (the United States)
- Coordinates: 38°24′57.30″N 82°21′54.54″W
- Country: United States
- State: West Virginia
- County: Cabell
- City: Huntington
- Elevation: 551 ft (168 m)
- Time zone: UTC-5 (Eastern (EST))
  - Summer (DST): UTC-4 (EDT)
- ZIP codes: 25701
- GNIS ID: 1740500

Altizer is an unincorporated community in Huntington, Cabell County, West Virginia, United States.

It is the location of Altizer Park, which features a softball/soccer field, basketball court, children's playground, walking paths, and a small water park.

== See also ==
- List of neighborhoods in Huntington, West Virginia
