= USRA 2-6-6-2 =

Class of American Mallet locomotives

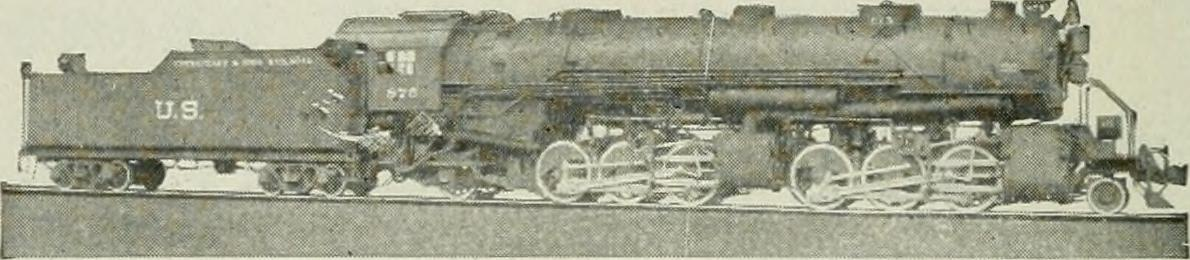
Type and origin
- Power type: Steam
- Builder: Baldwin (10); Alco (20)
- Build date: from 1911 to about 1940
- Total produced: 30
Specifications
- Configuration
  - Whyte: 2-6-6-2
- Gauge: 4 ft 8 1/2 in (1,435 mm) standard gauge
- Driver dia.: 56 1/4 in (1,429 mm)
- Trailing dia.: 45 in (1,143 mm)
- Adhesive weight: 376,500 lb (170,800 kg)
- Loco weight: 449,000 lb (204,000 kg)
- Boiler pressure: 210 psi (1.45 MPa)
- Cylinders: four, two LP (front), two HP (rear)
- High-pressure cylinder: 22 in × 32 in (559 mm × 813 mm)
- Low-pressure cylinder: 35 in × 32 in (889 mm × 813 mm)
Performance figures
- Tractive effort: 77,900 lbf (347 kN)

C&O Class H-6
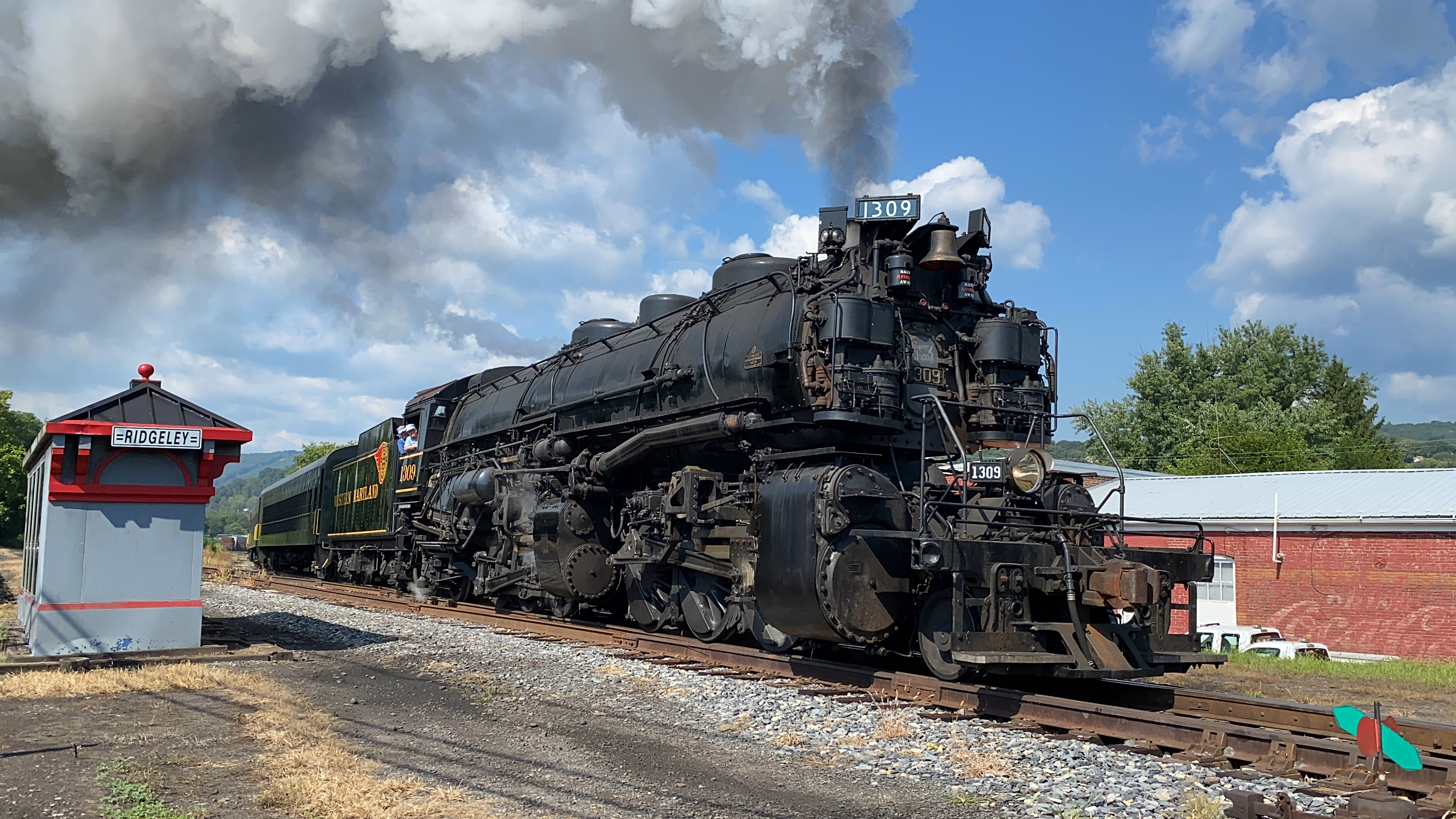
- ex-Chesapeake & Ohio No. 1309 on the Western Maryland Scenic Railroad in Ridgeley, West Virginia, in August 2022
Type and origin
- Only specifications that differ from above are shown
- Power type: Steam
- Builder: Baldwin
- Serial number: 74269–74278
- Build date: 1949
- Total produced: 10
Specifications
- Gauge: 4ft 8½in (1,435mm) standard gauge
- Driver dia.: 56 in (1,422 mm)
- Trailing dia.: 44 in (1,118 mm)
- Adhesive weight: 366,700 lb (166,300 kg)
- Loco weight: 434,900 lb (197,300 kg)
Performance figures
- Factor of adh.: 4.7
Career
- Operators: C&O
- Class: H6
- Numbers: 1300–1309
- Retired: 1957
- Preserved: Two: C&O 1308; C&O 1309
- Disposition: 2 preserved and one (#1309) operational, remainder scrapped

The USRA 2-6-6-2 is a standardized design of 2-6-6-2 Mallet locomotives developed by the United States Railroad Administration during World War I.

== Design ==
The USRA 2-6-6-2 locomotive is a Mallet, or compound articulated type, having both low-pressure and high-pressure cylinders. The smaller high-pressure cylinders power the rear set of driving wheels, and the larger low-pressure cylinders power the forward set of driving wheels. The USRA 2-6-6-2 articulated locomotives were direct developments of the Chesapeake & Ohio class H2 and H4 series.

== Orders ==
During the tenure of the USRA, 30 of these articulated steam locomotives were built. The Chesapeake and Ohio Railway (C&O) [875-894, later 1520-1539] and Wheeling and Lake Erie Railway (W&LE) [8001-8010] ordered the USRA 2-6-6-2 Mallet. The first Mallet was delivered to the W&LE in 1919 for $71,966.94. Later, the Nickel Plate Road (NKP) leased them from the W&LE, renumbering them for use on its rails. The independently pivoted front engine allowed it to negotiate branch lines and tight curves while hauling larger consists than its smaller cousins in the USRA series.

The Chesapeake & Ohio Railroad ordered the first of these compact 2-6-6-2 articulated steam locomotives from Alco in 1911. It was a massive locomotive for the time, and it performed well enough for the C&O to order additional, but slightly modified, versions right through 1923. These locomotives were designed to replace the 2-8-0 Consolidations for the coal drags on the C&O's Hinton Division. The 2-6-6-2s could handle more tonnage than the double-headed pair of 2-8-0s they replaced, and they burned less coal in the process. The 2-6-6-2s proved to be ideal mine run engines as their power and flexibility plus low weight on drivers made them ideal for the curving and heavily graded branches in the mountains of Virginia and West Virginia.

An additional ten (10) locomotives were built in 1949. These C&O Class H6 2-6-6-2s, numbered 1300 to 1309, were the last steam locomotives produced by Baldwin for use in the United States. The last of these were retired in 1957. Most of the locomotives were scrapped, but the last two produced were retained by C&O as examples of their steam heritage. The C&O 1308 is under care of the Age of Steam Roundhouse in Sugarcreek, Ohio in September 2025, while the C&O 1309 was restored to operation on December 31, 2020, at the Western Maryland Scenic Railroad in Cumberland, Maryland.
