= Western Maryland Scenic Railroad 1309 =

Preserved American 2-6-6-2 steam locomotive

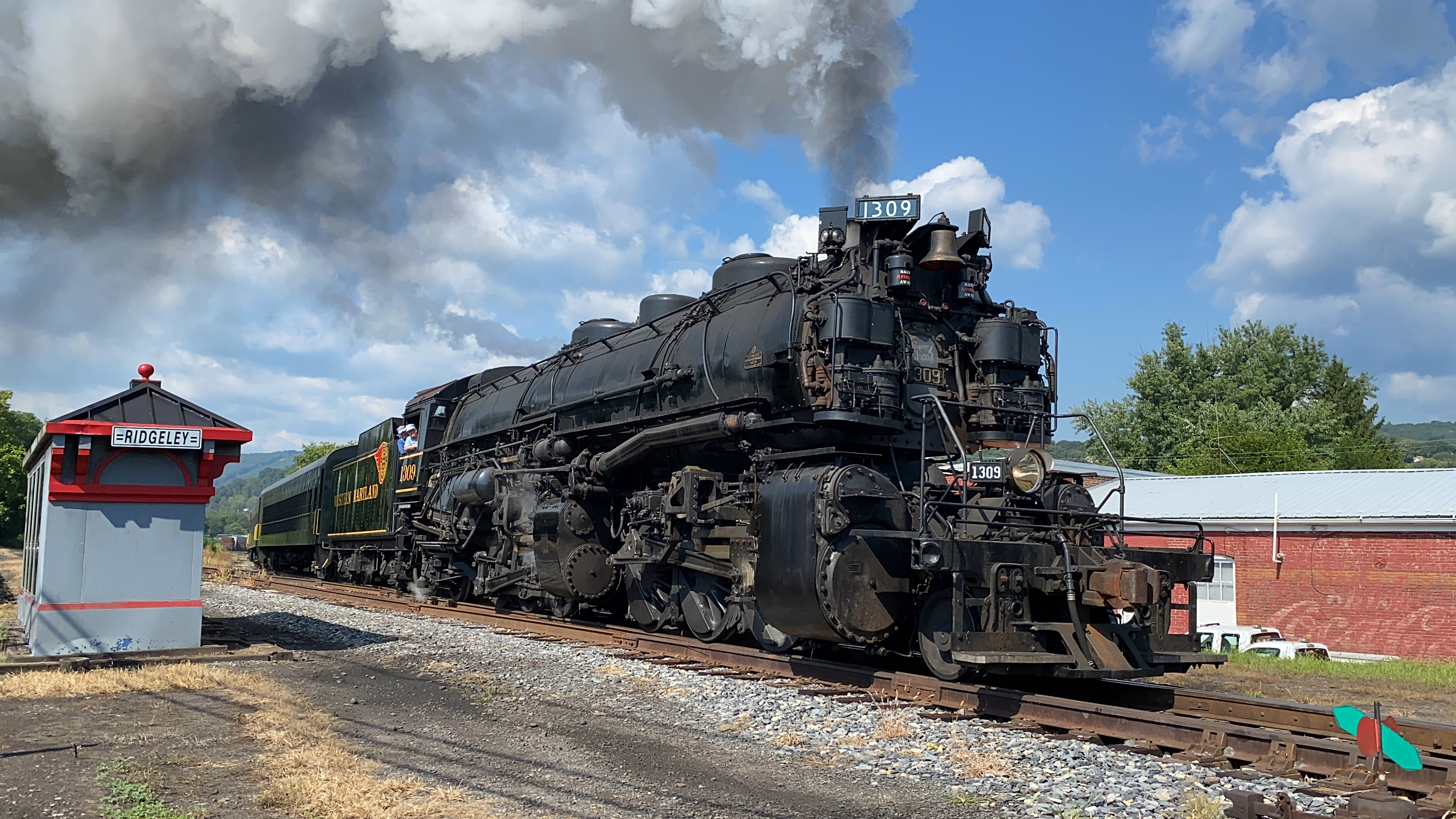
- Western Maryland Scenic Railroad No. 1309 pulls the Frostburg Flyer out of Ridgeley, West Virginia, in August 2022.
Type and origin
- Power type: Steam
- Builder: Baldwin Locomotive Works
- Order number: 48001
- Serial number: 74278
- Model: H-6
- Build date: November 1949
Specifications
- Configuration
  - Whyte: 2-6-6-2
- Gauge: 4 ft 8 1/2 in (1,435 mm)
- Leading dia.: 30 in (762 mm)
- Driver dia.: 56 in (1,422 mm)
- Trailing dia.: 44 in (1,118 mm)
- Minimum curve: 20°
- Wheelbase: 48.8 ft (14.87 m)
- Length: 99.7 ft (30.39 m)
- Height: 15 ft (4.57 m)
- Adhesive weight: 366,700 lb (166,332 kg)
- Loco weight: 434,900 lb (197,267 kg)
- Tender weight: 208,200 lb (94,438 kg)
- Total weight: 643,100 lb (291,705 kg)
- Tender type: 12-RC
- Fuel type: Soft coal
- Fuel capacity: 15 short tons (14 t)
- Water cap.: 12,000 US gal (45,425 L; 9,992 imp gal)
- Firebox
  - Grate area: 72.2 sq ft (6.71 m^{2})
- Boiler: 96 in (2,438 mm)
- Boiler pressure: 210 psi (1.45 MPa)
- Heating surface
  - Firebox: 363 sq ft (33.7 m^{2})
  - Tubes and flues: 4,436 sq ft (412.1 m^{2})
  - Total surface: 4,825 sq ft (448.3 m^{2})
- Superheater
  - Type: Type A
  - Heating area: 975 sq ft (90.6 m^{2})
- Cylinders: Four, compound: LP front, HP rear
- High-pressure cylinder: 22 in × 32 in (559 mm × 813 mm)
- Low-pressure cylinder: 35 in × 32 in (889 mm × 813 mm)
- Valve gear: Walschaerts
- Valve type: Piston valves
- Valve travel: 6 1/2 in (165 mm) (HP); 6 in (152 mm) (LP)
- Valve lap: 1 in (25 mm) (HP); 1 1/8 in (29 mm) (LP)
- Valve lead: 1/8 in (3 mm) (HP); 3/16 in (5 mm) (LP)
- Loco brake: Air
- Train brakes: Air
- Couplers: Knuckle
Performance figures
- Tractive effort: 98,300 lbf (437.26 kN) (simple); 77,900 lbf (346.52 kN) (compound)
- Factor of adh.: 3.73 (simple); 4.7 (compound)
Career
- Operators: Chesapeake and Ohio Railway; Western Maryland Scenic Railroad
- Class: H-6
- Number in class: 10th of 10
- Numbers: C&O 1309; WMSR 1309
- Nicknames: Maryland Thunder; Super Choo; The Beast of the East
- Retired: 1956
- Preserved: 1972
- Restored: December 31, 2020
- Current owner: Western Maryland Scenic Railroad
- Disposition: Operational

Western Maryland Scenic Railroad 1309 is a preserved compound articulated H-6 class 2-6-6-2 "Mallet" steam locomotive. Produced in November 1949, it was the last steam locomotive built by Baldwin Locomotive Works (BLW) for domestic service.

The Chesapeake and Ohio Railway (C&O) used it to pull coal trains until retiring it in 1956. In 1972, No. 1309 was moved to the B&O Railroad Museum for static display. In 2014, it was purchased by the Western Maryland Scenic Railroad (WMSR), which restored it to operating condition over the next six years. The WMSR put the locomotive into tourist excursion service on December 17, 2021: the first time an articulated locomotive operated in the Eastern United States since the retirement of Norfolk and Western 1218 in 1991.

As of 2026, No. 1309 is operational on the WMSR roster. It is one of two surviving H-6s, along with Chesapeake and Ohio 1308.

== History ==
=== Description ===
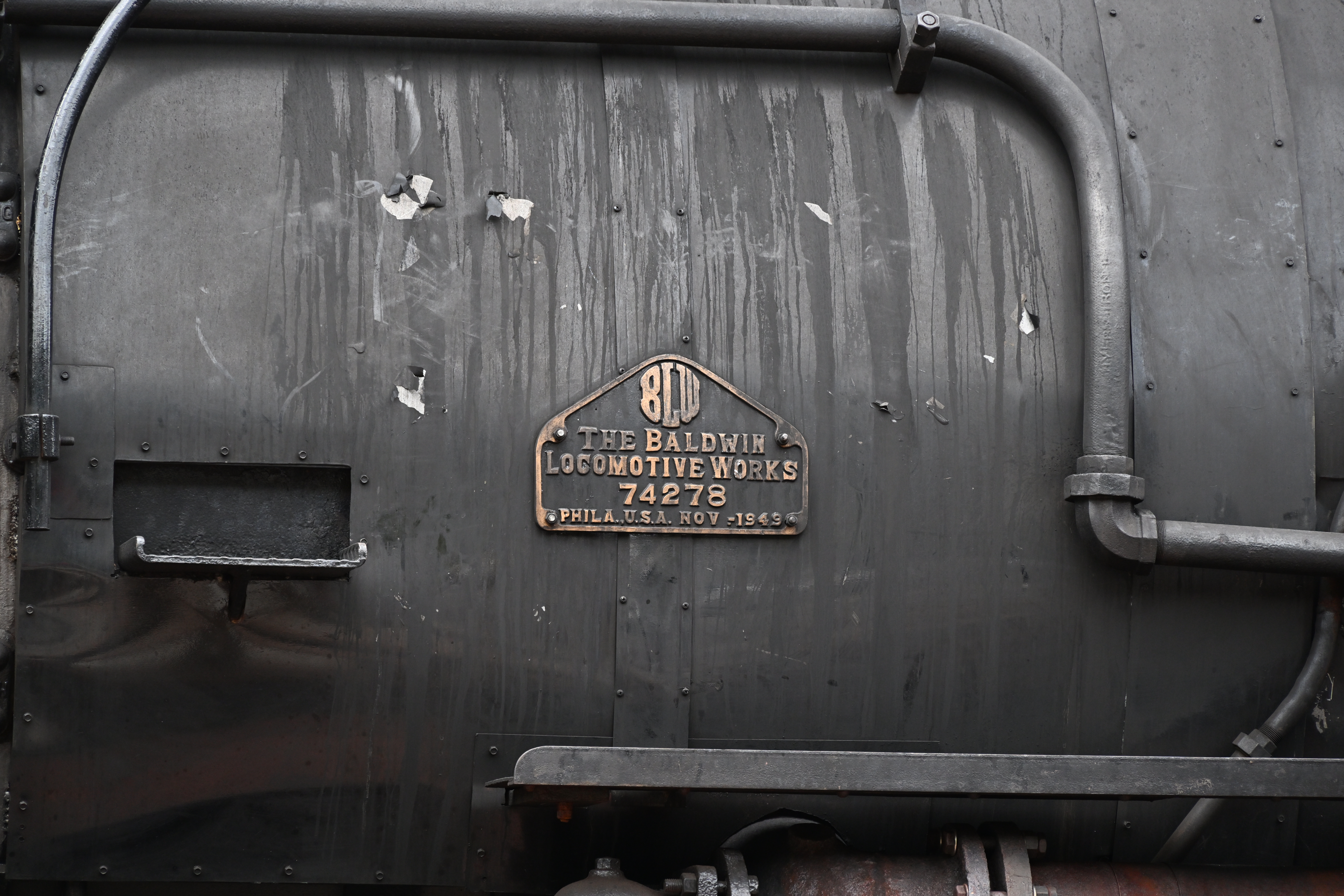
No. 1309's builder's plate

No. 1309 was based on a 40-year-old design, with mechanical lubricators, stoker, and superheater, the last of a series of 2-6-6-2s that the Chesapeake and Ohio Railway (C&O) began in 1911. It was similar to the USRA 2-6-6-2 chosen by the United States Railroad Administration as a standard design during World War I.

The engine is a Mallet articulated locomotive. This design was a compound locomotive: steam was expanded in smaller rear cylinders and the exhaust captured, then expanded a second time in larger lower-pressure front cylinders. Compound locomotives are more efficient than single-expansion machines, but the complexity of the design meant few U.S. railroads used them in the 20th century. The two sets of cylinders required the engines to be articulated to enable operation on tight radius turns common in mountainous areas in West Virginia and Kentucky coal country, adding complexity. It also had two cross-compound air compressors on the smokebox door to supply air for frequent heavy braking needed in mountain railroading. While complicated and uncommon, the C&O had a long history with Mallets and they were ideal for slow-speed work in West Virginia.

The C&O ordered 25 locomotives from Baldwin Locomotive Works (BLW) in 1948 to pull coal trains. When coal production dramatically fell due to labor unrest in 1949, the order was revised to just ten locomotives (Nos. 1300–1309), and No. 1309 became the last Class 1 domestic steam locomotive built by BLW.

=== Revenue service and retirement ===
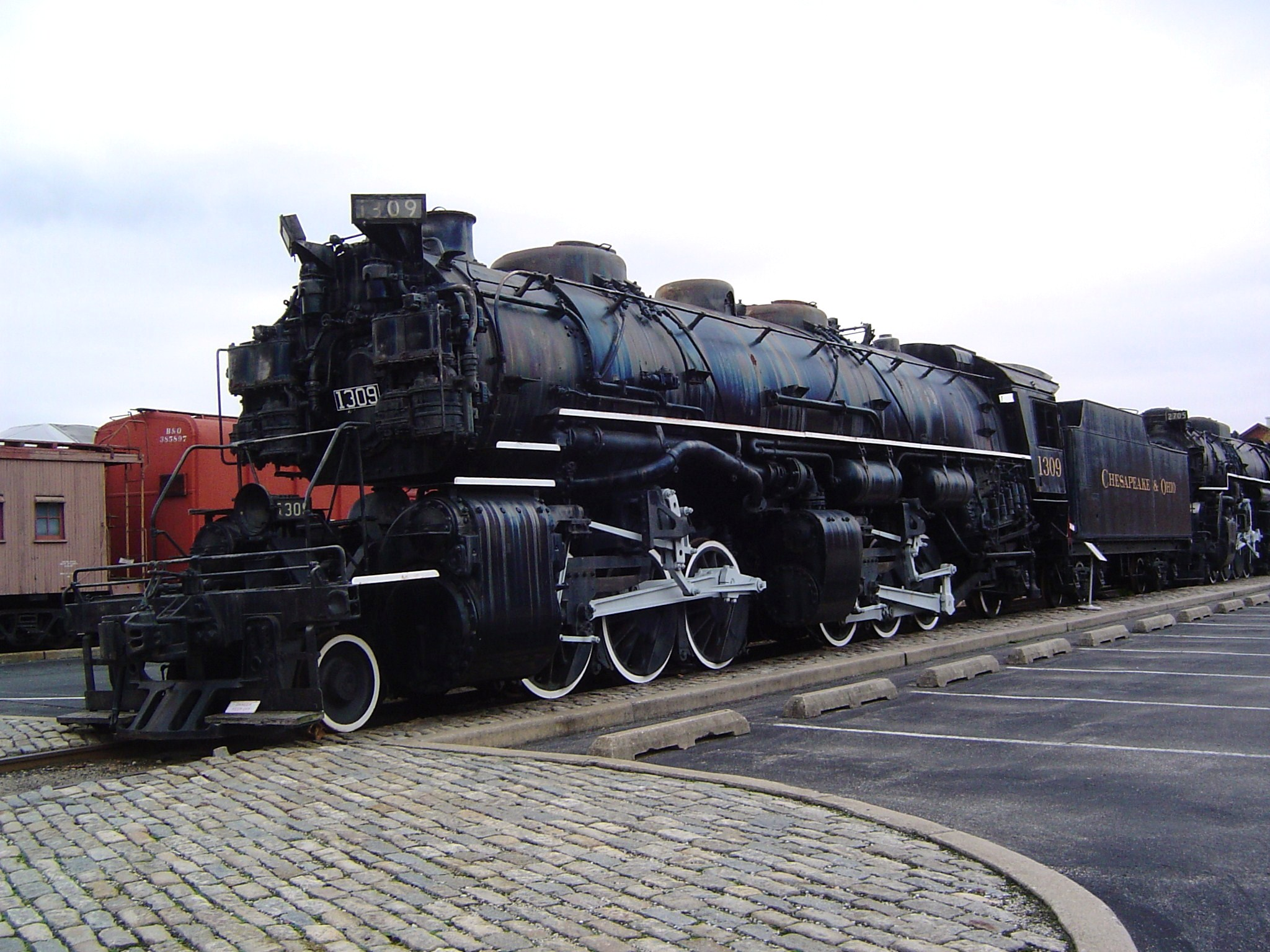
No. 1309 on static display at the B&O Railroad Museum, October 29, 2009

No. 1309 was assigned by C&O to pull heavy coal trains in the mountainous terrain of West Virginia and Kentucky. At the time the locomotive was ordered, the C&O was unprepared for dieselization of their fleet. In the early 1950s, when the C&O decided dieselization was inevitable, crews of the railroad opted not to maintain the new 2-6-6-2s, since they were only to last a few more years in service. No. 1309 was retired from revenue service in 1956, after which it was stored for nearly twenty years by the C&O's roundhouse at Peach Creek, West Virginia. No. 1309, along with several other steam locomotives, were removed from storage in 1972 for a cosmetic restoration and later moved to the B&O Railroad Museum in Baltimore, Maryland in 1975, where restoration was completed, and No. 1309 was put on outdoor static display.

=== Western Maryland Scenic Railroad ===
In 2013, the Western Maryland Scenic Railroad (WMSR), which operated tourist excursion trains between Cumberland and Frostburg, Maryland, began searching for a larger steam locomotive to restore and operate, since their smaller locomotive, 2-8-0 No. 734, was mechanically worn out and was nearly due for its mandatory 1,472-day overhaul. By May 2014, WMSR decided that the No. 1309 locomotive was a good candidate and believed it was in good enough condition due to its short working span on the C&O. The B&O Railroad Museum agreed to sell No. 1309 to WMSR for its scrap value of $50,000, since the H-6 did not fit their overall collection plans, and they had another articulated locomotive: C&O H-8 "Allegheny" No. 1604.

WSMR worked with the museum, TTX, Hulcher Services, and CSX to separate No. 1309 and load it onto two heavy-duty flatcars, since CSX prohibited the locomotive from being towed on its wheels on the railroad's mainline. The disassembled locomotive was shipped via CSX manifest freight train No. L341 from Baltimore to Cumberland on July 21. On July 23, as the train travelled through Brunswick, Maryland, a tractor trailer knocked over a grade crossing signal at S. Maple Avenue, and No. L341 hit the signal and made an emergency stop. The locomotive and consist were undamaged, and the train proceeded.

Upon arrival at WMSR's workshop in Ridgeley, West Virginia, No. 1309 was unloaded, and its rebuild began by the end of July. The plan called for returning all parts to original specifications or better, and making the restored locomotive "better and more reliable than it was in 1949". Upon disassembly, several parts of the locomotive were found to be in poor condition, and many of the parts had to be replaced, including the cab, several staybolts, and crown stays, while several patches had to be made to the firebox.

In early January 2017, the railroad said that the reassembly process at the Ridgeley shop would begin that month and announced that the inaugural trip of the restored locomotive would take place on July 1, 2017; it began selling tickets for the excursion. That schedule was not met due to funding problems. The railroad had spent $800,000 but needed a matching grant of $400,000 from the state of Maryland to continue work.

In August 2017, planned operation in November was further delayed until 2018 after corrosion was found on the locomotive's axles, requiring more work on the axles, wheel boxes, and crank pins. Restoration work almost stopped in November 2017 due to a lack of funding, although work on the wheels continued with donations. The $400,000 provided by the state of Maryland had been spent and the railroad estimated it needed at least $530,000 more to complete the restoration, including $120,000 for the running gear and $115,000 for the boiler. The railroad was soliciting donations from people, seeking grants, and raising money with "freight photo charters".

In January 2018, Maryland state senator Wayne Norman proposed that Allegany County provide $530,000 to complete the restoration. The senator said there would be an economic benefit to the county in tourism, even drawing people from Europe and Asia. The county provides a $140,000 annual operating subsidy to the railroad, matched by $250,000 from the state of Maryland.

In February 2018, the restoration project suffered another setback when the railroad learned that an employee had stolen parts, including bronze bearings and wear plates, and sold them for scrap at a salvage yard. The thefts were discovered by the Allegany County Sheriff's Office after they were alerted by the scrap yard. Stolen parts included 12 original crown brasses and 12 hub liners. The parts would have to be remade as they were damaged during removal. The scrapyard had paid the employee a total of $14,662 for the parts, some of which weighed 300 pounds (140 kg). Formal charges were filed against the employee.

In June 2018, the boiler passed a hydrostatic test required by the Federal Railroad Administration. The boiler was pressurized to 25% above its maximum operating pressure of 210 pounds per square inch (1,400 kPa). Stationary test firings to check for boiler leaks occurred several months later. The restoration had cost $1.8 million as of mid-2018, including $800,000 provided by the state of Maryland. The Western Maryland Scenic General Manager John Garner estimated the final cost to be $2.4 million.

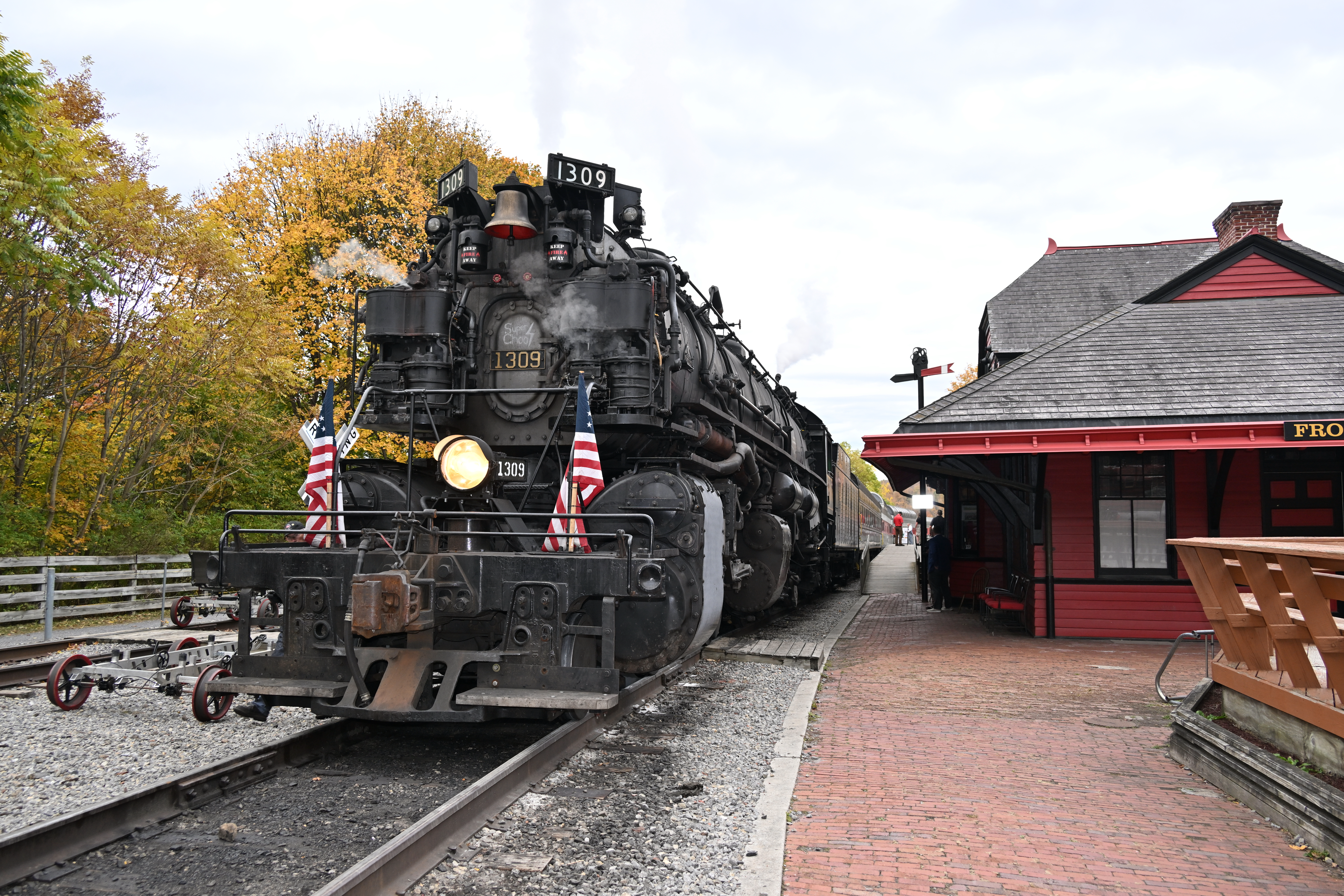
No. 1309 idling with a round-trip excursion at the former Cumberland and Pennsylvania station at Frostburg, Maryland on October 16, 2022

In September 2019, the project was again halted due to a lack of funds shortly after the front drivers were attached to the engine. The railroad said it would no longer make estimates of when the restoration would be complete. The total spent on the project was $2.8 million. In February 2020, a new crowdfunding campaign was announced to raise $390,000 to finish the restoration. The organizers claimed the restoration could be completed in six months. In early May 2020, restoration work resumed and a fundraising effort promoted by Trains Magazine raised more than $100,000 to restart the restoration. The WMSR estimated they were still around $200,000 short of completing the work and started developing a fund to cover initial operating expenses and facilities for fuel, water, and ash removal to name a few items.

On December 31, 2020, the restoration was completed and the locomotive moved under its own power for the first time in 64 years as part of a series of test runs to return it to operating condition. (Note: A much larger steam locomotive, the Union Pacific's Big Boy No. 4014 was restored to operational status in May 2019, but is being used for occasional excursion service as opposed to regularly scheduled service.) On November 19, 2021, No. 1309 entered its break-in run phase, running from Cumberland to Helmstetter's curve and back for testing. After numerous test runs, the locomotive finally entered excursion service on December 17, 2021, pulling the annual Polar Express train.

On February 25–27, 2022, WMSR and Trains hosted a private photo charter runby of No. 1309 hauling an 11-car freight train consist over Helmstetter's Curve. On May 6, 2022, a plaque was mounted inside No. 1309's cab, honoring former Trains editor Jim Wrinn, who died earlier in 2022 and had been deeply involved in the restoration project. Two more plaques were mounted under both sides of No. 1309's cab, honoring the late Jack Showalter, who ran the Allegany Central Railroad between 1988 and 1991 on the same line that the WMSR operated today.

During Father's Day weekend, No. 1309 was temporarily outfitted with a Pennsylvania Railroad (PRR) 3-chime whistle, which came from a PRR class T1 4-4-4-4 locomotive. On October 14, 2022, No. 1309 pulled a fundraiser excursion in partnership with the Railroaders Memorial Museum to fund the restoration of the PRR No. 1361 steam locomotive. The latter's whistle was temporarily fitted on the former, and the excursion raised more than $13,000. In February 2023, No. 1309 was temporarily backdated to its original C&O appearance for the Lerro Production photo charters. In mid-2023, No. 1309 was temporarily out of service for maintenance work to its running gear and returned to service in early October 2023.

In January 2024, No. 1309 a faulty lubricator caused more running gear problems, so the locomotive was taken out of service again for maintenance. It was discovered that No. 1309 needed new pistons and rods. After 15 months of fundraising and repairs, WMSR returned No. 1309 to service in May 2025.

== See also ==
- Bessemer and Lake Erie 643
- Chesapeake and Ohio 490
- Chesapeake and Ohio 614
- Chesapeake and Ohio 1308
- Chesapeake and Ohio 2716
- Norfolk and Western 2156
- Union Pacific 3985

== Bibliography ==
- Hankey, John (2017). "Taming the Beast of the East". Trains Special Edition. Kalmbach Media. pp. 20–23.
