= Heritage Farm Museum and Village =

Open-air living history museum

- Motto: Celebrating Appalachian Ingenuity & Adventure

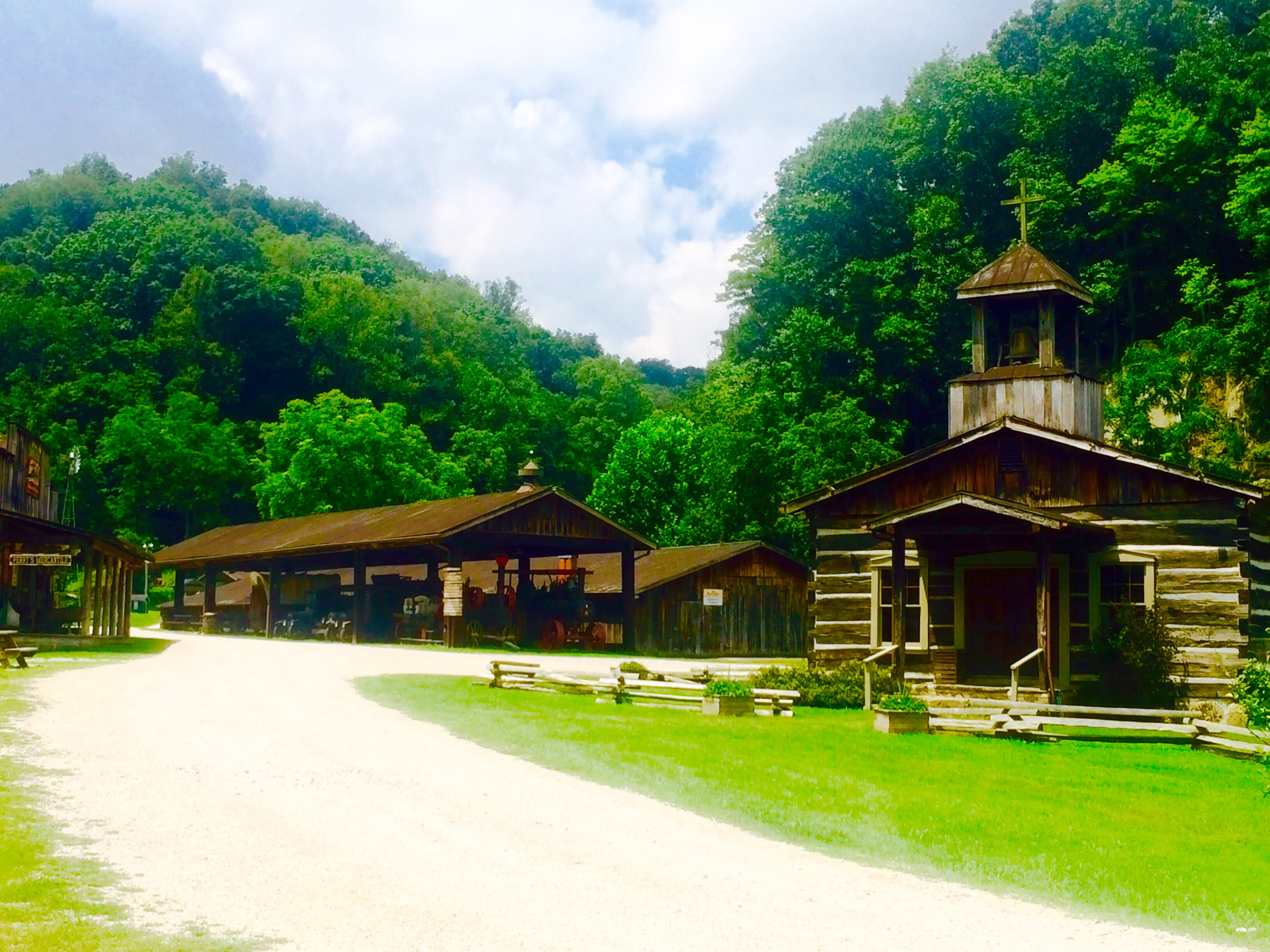
- Heritage Village

- Location within West Virginia
- Established: 4 May 1996
- Location: Huntington, WV
- Coordinates: 38.37642°N 82.467222°W
- Type: Appalachian History and Culture
- Founders: A. Michael and Henriella Perry
- Website: www.heritagefarmmuseum.com

Heritage Farm Museum and Village is an open-air living history museum in Huntington, West Virginia that focuses on Appalachian history and culture. Originally conceived as a location to house and display the private collection of A. Michael "Mike" and Henriella Perry, Heritage Farm has expanded into an entire Appalachian Frontier Village that was recently named West Virginia's first Smithsonian-affiliated museum.

== History ==
In 1973, co-founders Mike and Henriella Perry decided to relocate from Huntington city proper to a farmhouse on the outskirts of town in Harveytown. Their interest was piqued by the old wooden logs they discovered beneath the walls of their house. Their efforts to understand the tools and techniques involved in building a cabin, coupled with their hobby of antiquing, led to the genesis of what would become Heritage Farm. Originally a private collection housed in a nearby barn, they soon began to accumulate authentic old structures and materials that they felt would convey an appreciation for everyday life in Appalachia from the 19th century to the present. Heritage Farm in its current sense began with the first "May Festival" on May 4, 1996. This event was the only day the village was open on an annual basis until 2006.

Currently, Heritage Farm welcomes guests from May through October on Fridays and Saturdays. In December, 4 evenings are designated as "Christmas Village," during which the buildings are decorated with lights and holiday activities are available.

== Museums ==
Heritage Farm has seven main museum buildings:

Name	Description	Image
Progress Museum	Charts the technological and social change in Appalachia from its earliest settlers to the mid-20th century.	
Transportation Museum	Houses a collection of vehicles and models including a conestoga wagon, bicycles, steam engines, early American cars, and various early forms of transportation.	
Country Store Museum	A recreation of a 19th-century country store, with a pharmacy, post office, butcher shop, and other period-appropriate displays.	
The Bowes Doll and Carriage Exhibit	Built and created by Don and Connie Bowes, the doll and carriage exhibit is a walk-through doll house with a large collection of handmade furnishings.	
Heritage Museum	Contains the earliest displays that were available for viewing at Heritage Farm, including a barbershop, woodworking office, and various washing machines and butter churns.	
Industry Museum	Chronicles the centrality of industry to the Appalachian region; includes a walk-through coal mine and a glassblowing furnace among other displays.	
Children's Hands-On Activity Center	Museum designed to educate children about different chores and tasks required to run a farm, as well as providing a glimpse into what farm life was like.	

== Adventure Park ==
New to Heritage Farm in 2021, high-ropes courses and a zip line were installed. Guests are encouraged to "Appalachian Up" as they celebrate the spirit of Appalachian adventure. There are 6 components of Heritage Farm categorized as the Adventure Park. Making reservations for activities is highly recommended, being the only way to guarantee a timeslot.

Name	Description	Requirements	Image
RedTail Racers Dual Zipline	Dual 1100-foot long ziplines traveling over and back across the valley that houses Heritage Farm at 40 miles per hour. While over the valley, guests are 130 feet high.	-Weight requirement: between 75-250 pounds -Closed toe shoes and shorts/pants must be worn	RedTail Racers Zipline (the beginning zipline) Two participants on the beginning zipline RedTail Racers Zipline (the returning zipline)
TalithaKoum	A challenging aerial adventure course with three levels ranging from 15 to 40 feet high. Includes rope and cable bridges, teetering platforms, swinging beams, cargo nets, among other elements.	-Weight requirement: between 75-250 pounds -Closed toe shoes and shorts/pants must be worn	TalithaKoum
Mountain Top Drop	A 40-foot belayed free fall experience from the tower on the TalithaKoum course. Included with purchase of TalithaKoum, but can also be booked separately.	-Weight requirement: between 75-250 pounds -Closed toe shoes and shorts/pants must be worn	Mountain Top Drop
TreeRock Challenge	A family friendly aerial challenge course with two levels ranging from 5 to 15 feet high. Includes various rope and cable bridges, as well as two mini-ziplines.	-Weight requirement: between 50-250 pounds -Closed toe shoes and shorts/pants must be worn	TreeRock Challenge
Rock Climbing Wall	A 25-foot tall rock wall with purchase granting climbing access for that day.	-Height requirement: at least 42 inches tall -Weight requirement: between 45-250 pounds -Closed toe shoes and shorts/pants must be worn	Rock Climbing Wall
Holler Hauler	A chauffeured UTV/side-by-side ride through the hills of Heritage Farm. Included as transportation to RedTail Racers, TalithaKoum, and Mountain Top Drop, but can also be booked separately.	N/A	Holler Hauler

== Lodging ==
In addition to museums, Heritage Farm rents buildings for visitors to lodge in. All the log cabins but one are constructed from 19th-century logs sourced from around West Virginia. Other lodgings of note include a 19th-century dairy barn reconstructed into a conference and retreat center, and a 1940s N&W Caboose with fold-out beds.

Name	Description	Image
Applebutter Inn	Located inside Heritage Village.	
Blackberry Inn	Originally a cabin from Lavalette, WV with two additions made of logs from Mason County, WV.	
Hollyberry Inn	This home was constructed as a farmhouse and has existed in its current location since before Heritage Farm came into being.	
Strawberry Inn	The first cabin reassembled at the farm. The logs came from various cabins throughout Cabell and Wayne counties in West Virginia.	
Woodbury Inn	The most secluded and most recent addition of all cabins.	
Barn Conference and Retreat Center	A 19th century dairy barn with 9000 square feet of space that serves as a venue for camps and conferences.	
Caboose	A real N&W Virginian railroad caboose. Sleeps four.	

== Historic Buildings and Implements ==
In addition to museums and lodging, Heritage Farm has a number of period buildings, as well as machines and implements, used for various tasks in Appalachian everyday life. Some implements are only in use during special festival days.

Name	Description	Image
Blacksmith Shop	A complete blacksmith shop, including working forge.	
Bread Oven	A wood-fired masonry oven.	
Church	19th century log church relocated from Lincoln County, West Virginia.	
Conway Frontier Cabin	Log cabin belonging to the Conway family, relocated a short distance to Heritage Farm.	
Potter's Kiln and Shed	Working Potter's Kiln and accompanying shed, where area potters work and give classes on the subject.	
Sawmill	A Sawmill still in operation.	
Schoolhouse	Early 20th-century One-room schoolhouse that housed Lick Creek School. Relocated to the former spot of the Ratcliffe one-room schoolhouse by the Heritage Farm main gate.	
Tobacco Barn	Old log barn that is meant to recreate a 19th-century tobacco barn.	
Windmill	Recreation of an early American windmill.	

== Attractions ==
=== Artisans ===
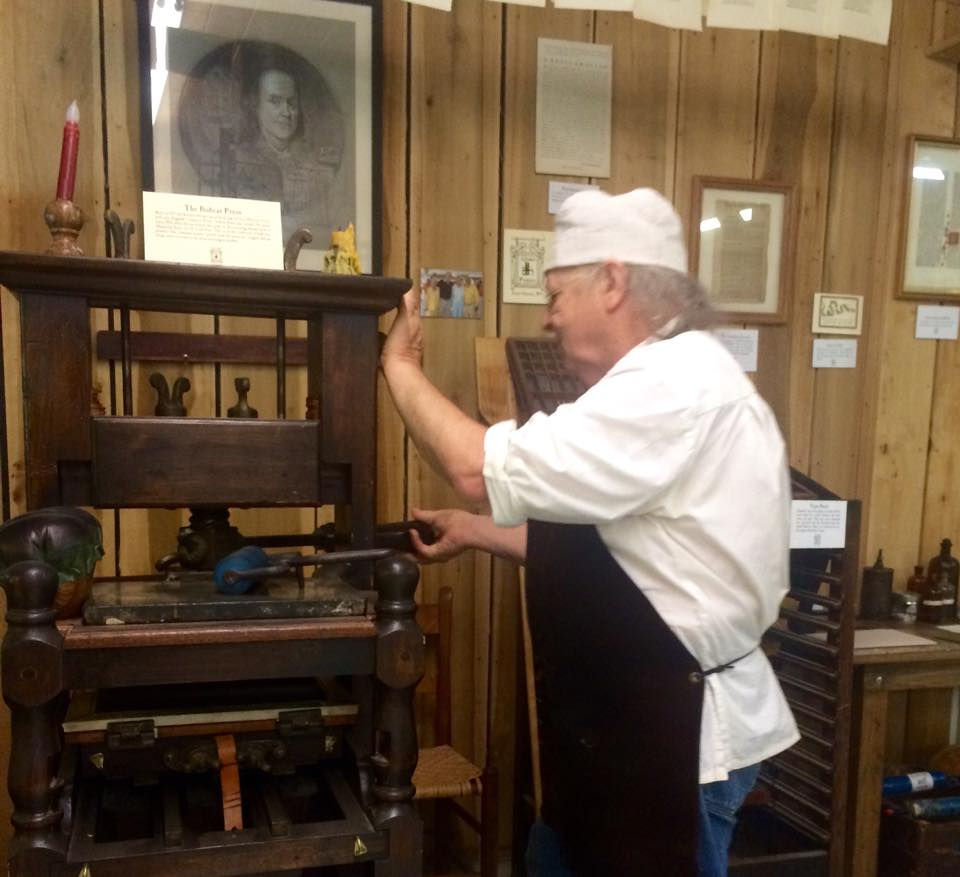
A printer practices his trade at the Artisan Center

Heritage Farm employs local artisans who practice old forms of craftsmanship using authentic, antique equipment related to their professions. Artisans include (but are not limited to) broommakers, weavers, printers, tinsmiths, woodworkers, and blacksmiths. In addition to hosting artisans throughout the week, Heritage Farm also hosts occasional classes given by artisans in the basics of their profession.

=== Festivals ===
Events have included old-time music festivals, cast-iron cookoffs, Hatfield and McCoy weekends, Spring Festival, Fall Festival, and Christmas Village. Christmas Village, which occurs on 4 evenings in December, is described as "a spectacular lighted Appalachian village and all your favorite Christmas activities! Visit with Santa, see our live nativity, wagon ride to view lights, Christmas music, visit with Frosty the Snowman, purchase gifts from Heritage Farm Artisans, and more!"

=== Petting zoo ===
A petting zoo of farm animals is open to the public on festival days and throughout the summer. Animals include miniature horses, goats, pigs, sheep, rabbits, as well as non-traditional farm animals such as llamas, peacocks, and a camel.

== In popular culture ==
- Featured on an episode of American Pickers that aired 12 December 2011 entitled "Pickin' Perry-dise".
- Provided the filming location for the History Channel documentary "America's Feud: Hatfields and McCoys".
- Featured in Barnwood Builders Season 02 Episode 12 "Grandma's Cabin".

== See also ==
- List of museums in Huntington, West Virginia
