= Chesapeake and Ohio 1308 =

Preserved American 2-6-6-2 locomotive

Chesapeake & Ohio 1308
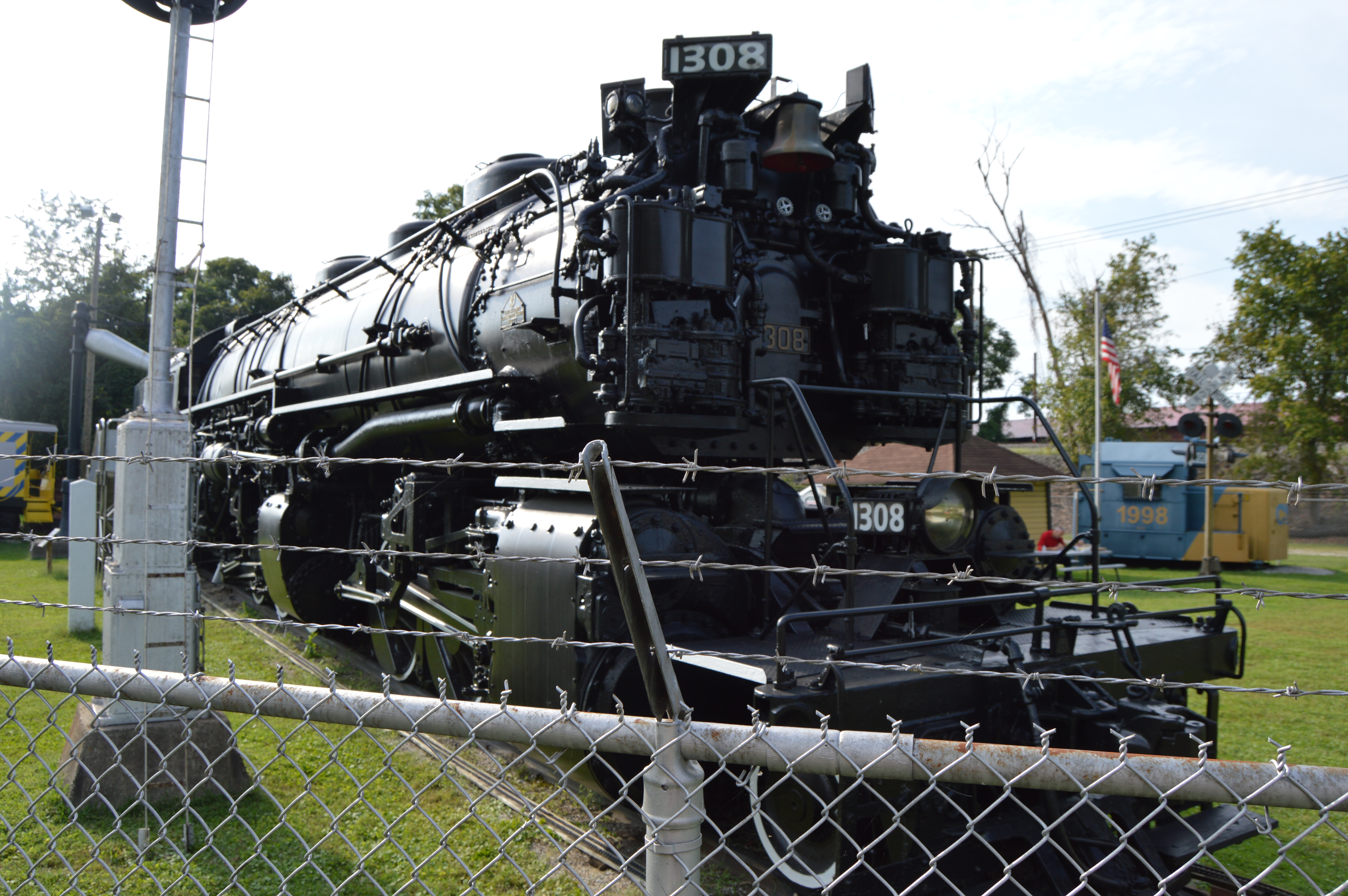
- Front and right side at the Huntington Railroad Museum
Type and origin
- References
- Power type: Steam
- Builder: Baldwin Locomotive Works
- Order number: 48001
- Serial number: 74277
- Build date: 1949
- Total produced: 10
Specifications
- Configuration
  - Whyte: 2-6-6-2
- Gauge: 4 ft 8 1/2 in (1,435 mm)
- Driver dia.: 56 in (1,422 mm)
- Wheelbase: 48.8 ft (14.87 m)
- Length: 99.7 ft (30.39 m)
- Adhesive weight: 366,700 lb (166,332 kg)
- Loco weight: 434,900 lb (197,267 kg)
- Tender weight: 208,200 lb (94,438 kg)
- Total weight: 643,100 lb (291,705 kg)
- Tender type: 12-RC
- Fuel type: Soft coal
- Water cap.: 12,000 US gal (45,425 L; 9,992 imp gal)
- Tender cap.: 16 short tons (15 t)
- Firebox
  - Grate area: 72 sq ft (6.7 m^{2})
- Boiler: 96 in (2,438 mm)
- Boiler pressure: 210 psi (1.45 MPa)
- Feedwater heater: none
- Heating surface: 4,830 sq ft (449 m^{2})
- Superheater
  - Type: Type A
  - Heating area: 991 sq ft (92.1 m^{2})
- Cylinders: Four, compound: LP front, HP rear
- High-pressure cylinder: 22 in × 32 in (559 mm × 813 mm)
- Low-pressure cylinder: 35 in × 32 in (889 mm × 813 mm)
- Valve gear: Walschaerts
- Valve type: Piston valves
- Loco brake: Air
- Train brakes: Air
- Couplers: Knuckle
Performance figures
- Tractive effort: 98,700 lbf (439.04 kN)
- Factor of adh.: 4.66
Career
- Operators: Chesapeake and Ohio Railway
- Class: H-6
- Number in class: 9th of 10
- Numbers: C&O 1308
- Retired: February 29, 1956
- Preserved: September 1962
- Current owner: Age of Steam Roundhouse Museum
- Disposition: Undergoing cosmetic restoration
- Chesapeake and Ohio 1308 Steam Locomotive
- U.S. National Register of Historic Places
- Location within Ohio Location within the United States
- Location: 213 Smokey Lane Road SW, Sugarcreek, Ohio
- Coordinates: 40°28′44.4″N 81°39′58.9″W
- Area: 0.5 acres (0.20 ha)
- Built: 1949
- Architect: Baldwin Locomotive Works
- Architectural style: H-6 Locomotive
- NRHP reference No.: 02001571
- Added to NRHP: January 31, 2003

Chesapeake and Ohio Railway 1308 is a preserved articulated 2-6-6-2 "Mallet" type steam locomotive built by Baldwin Locomotive Works in 1949. It was the next to the last Class 1 mainline locomotive built by Baldwin, closing out more than 100 years of production, a total of more than 70,000 locomotives. Its other surviving sister locomotive, No. 1309, has been restored to operation at the Western Maryland Scenic Railroad in Cumberland, Maryland.

== History ==
Built in 1949, No. 1308 was among the last of a series of 2-6-6-2s that the C&O used, starting in 1911. A very similar design, the USRA 2-6-6-2 was chosen by the United States Railroad Administration as one of its standard designs thirty years earlier during World War I. The advantage of the design was that it could be used on the relatively light, tightly curved, branch lines in West Virginia and Kentucky coal country, and that's where it worked for its seven-year working life, making the two-hour run from Peach Creek, near Logan, West Virginia to the Ohio River at Russell, Kentucky with an occasional trip to Hinton, West Virginia. Its use in heavy mountain railroading is emphasized by its two cross compound air compressors mounted on the smokebox door to supply enough air for frequent heavy braking.

The class was unusual for the time in that they were true Mallets, since their steam was expanded once in their smaller rear cylinders and then a second time in their larger front cylinders. While compound locomotives are more efficient than single expansion, their extra complication led to very few United States railroads using them after the turn of the century. The C&O had a long history with Mallets and they were ideal for slow speed work in West Virginia.

After its last run on February 29, 1956, it was stored at Russell until the C&O gave it to the Collis P. Huntington Railroad Historical Society, Inc., a group founded in 1959. Collis P. Huntington is best known as one of the Big Four who built the Central Pacific Railroad from San Francisco to Promontory, Utah, but following that he spent at least ten years as a leading figure of the C&O. The town where 1308 sits is named for him. The C&O donated the engine to the New River Train Group in 1962 as has been on since been on static display at the Collis P. Huntington Railroad Historical Society, Inc.

The locomotive was added to the National Register of Historic Places as Chesapeake and Ohio 1308 Steam Locomotive in 2003.

On September 29, 2025, it was announced that the Age of Steam Roundhouse Museum in Sugarcreek, Ohio had acquired 1308, giving the museum their 25th steam locomotive, and of particular note, their first articulated locomotive. It arrived at the roundhouse in November 2026.

== Surviving sisters ==
- No.1309, operational with the Western Maryland Scenic Railroad

== See also ==
- National Register of Historic Places listings in Cabell County, West Virginia
- Huntington Railroad Museum
