= List of museums in Huntington, West Virginia =

This list of museums in Huntington, West Virginia encompasses museums defined for this context as institutions (including nonprofit organizations, government entities, and private businesses) that collect and care for objects of cultural, artistic, scientific, or historical interest and make their collections or related exhibits available for public viewing. Also included are university and non-profit art galleries. Museums that exist only in cyberspace (i.e., virtual museums) are not included.

== Museums ==
Name	Neighborhood	Type	Note	Address	Reference
Birke Art Gallery	Marshall University	Art	Art gallery displaying Marshall University student's work. Located in the Marshall University Visual Arts Center	927 3rd Ave, 25701	
C. Fred Edwards Conservatory	Ritter Park	Science	Largest conservatory in West Virginia, located next to Huntington Museum of Art	2033 McCoy Rd, 25701	
Central City Museum	Old Central City	History	History museum focusing on Appalachian history and culture.	544 14th St W, 25704	
Charles W. and Norma C. Carrol Gallery	Marshall University	Art	Art gallery displaying Marshall University student's work. Located in the Marshall University Visual Arts Center.	927 3rd Ave, 25701	
Collis P. Huntington Railroad Historical Society Indoor Railroad Museum	Downtown	Transportation	History museum focusing on rail transportation and Collis P. Huntington	1323 8th Avenue, 25701	
Heritage Farm Children's Activity Museum	Harvey Town	Children's Activity	Children's Activity museum focusing on Appalachian history and culture, within the Heritage Farm Museum	3300 Harvey Rd, 25704	
Heritage Farm Country Store Museum	Harvey Town	Business	History museum focusing on Appalachian history and culture, within the Heritage Farm Museum	3300 Harvey Rd, 25704	
Heritage Farm Heritage Museum	Harvey Town	History	History museum focusing on Appalachian history and culture, within the Heritage Farm Museum	3300 Harvey Rd, 25704	
Heritage Farm Industry Museum	Harvey Town	Industry	History museum focusing on Appalachian history and culture, within the Heritage Farm Museum	3300 Harvey Rd, 25704	
Heritage Farm Progress Museum	Harvey Town	History	History museum focusing on Appalachian history and culture, within the Heritage Farm Museum	3300 Harvey Rd, 25704	
Heritage Farm Schoolhouse Museum	Harvey Town	History	History museum focusing on Appalachian history and culture, within the Heritage Farm Museum	3300 Harvey Rd, 25704	
Heritage Farm Transportation Museum	Harvey Town	Transportation	History museum focusing on Appalachian history and culture, within the Heritage Farm Museum	3300 Harvey Rd, 25704	
Huntington Children's Museum	Old Central City	Children's Activity	General children's activity museum.	1700 Washington Ave, 25704	
Huntington Museum of Art	Ritter Park	Art	General fine art museum, the largest museum between Cincinnati, Pittsburgh, and Richmond.	2033 McCoy Rd, 25701	
Huntington Railroad Museum	Old Central City	Transportation	History museum focusing on railroad transportation and trains	14th St. West at Memorial Blvd, 25701	
Marshall University Geology Museum	Marshall University	Geology	Geology museum focusing on Appalachia.	1 John Marshall Dr, 25755	
Marshall University One-Room Schoolhouse	Marshall University	History	History museum focusing on Appalachia.	1700 5th Ave, 25703	
Museum of Radio and Technology	Harvey Town	Technology	History museum focusing on electronic communication and entertainment and includes hands-on exhibits.	640 Florence Ave, 25701	
Pneumatic Gallery	Downtown	Art	Art gallery displaying Marshall University student's work. Located in the Marshall University Visual Arts Center.	927 3rd Ave, 25701	
Safety Town	Old Central City	Children's Activity	Children's activity museum, focused on road safety, built to resemble a miniature town.	1450 Memorial Blvd., 25701	
Sloane Square Gallery	Old Central City	Art	Art gallery focusing on Appalachian culture.	611 14th St W, 25704	
Thomas Carroll House	Guyandotte	History	A history museum focusing on the American Civil War.	234 Guyan St, 25702	
Touma Medical Museum	Downtown	Medical	History museum that contains more than 2,800 medical artifacts, including a medical library, owned by Marshall University	314 9th St, 25701	

== Other museums in the Huntington–Ashland metropolitan area ==
- Blenko Glass Visitor Center and Museum, in Milton, West Virginia
- C. B. Nuckolls Community Center & Black History Museum, in Ashland, Kentucky
- Ceredo Historical Society Museum, in Ceredo, West Virginia
- Daughters of the American Revolution Toll House Museum, in Barboursville, West Virginia
- Gen. Albert Gallatin Jenkins House, in Lesage, West Virginia
- Highlands Museum and Discovery Center, in Ashland, Kentucky
- Lawrence County Museum, in Ironton, Ohio
- The McConnell House, in Wurtland, Kentucky
- Z. D. Ramsdell House, in Ceredo, West Virginia
