= Huntington Children's Museum =

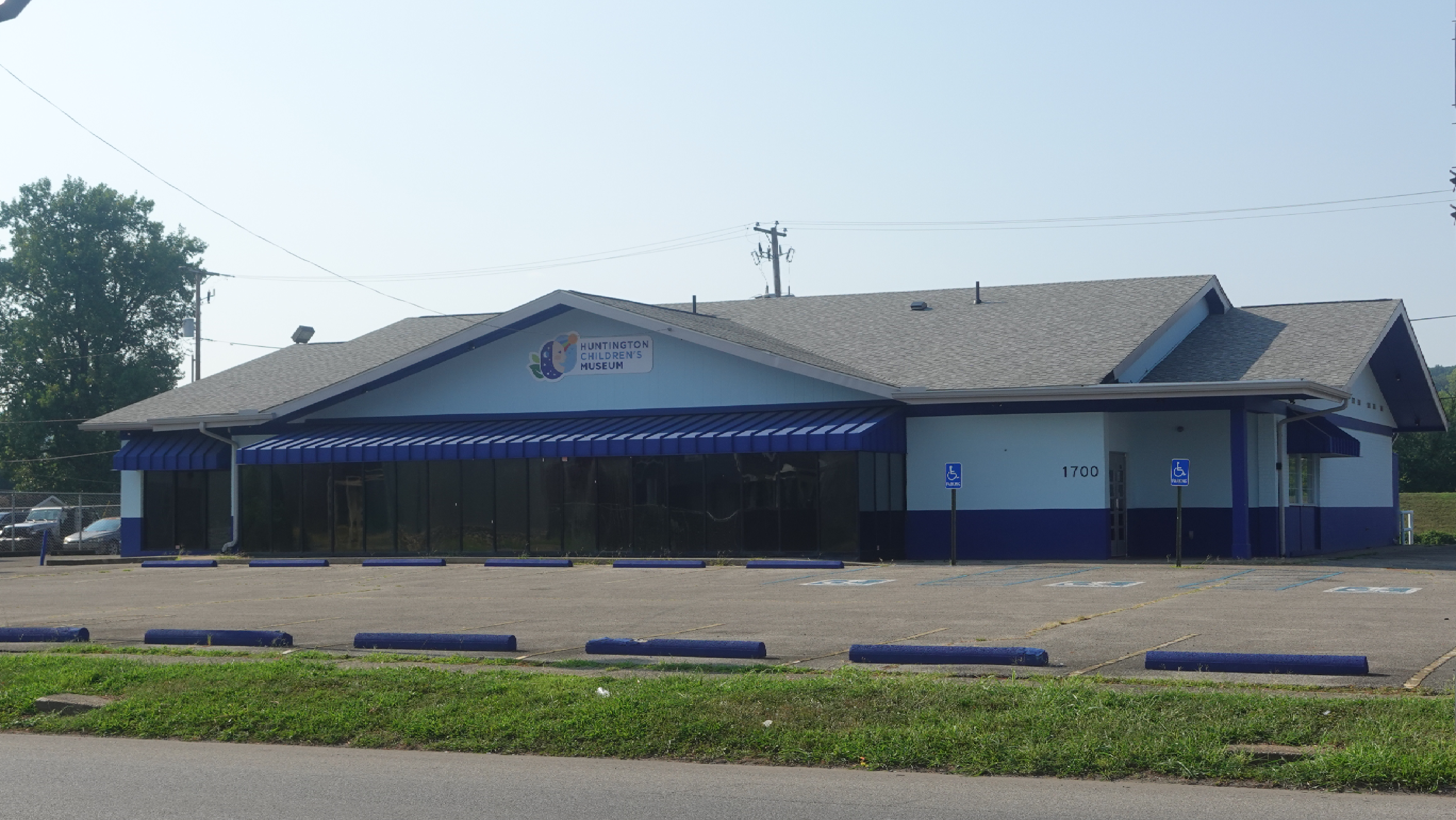
- Huntington Children's Museum in 2024
- Established: 13 July 2024; 20 months ago
- Location: 1700 Washington Ave, Huntington, West Virginia 25704
- Coordinates: 38°24′42.732″N 82°29′7.728″W
- Type: Children Activity Museum
- Executive director: Raine Klover
- Website: Official Website

Huntington Children's Museum is a children activity museum located in West Huntington, Huntington, West Virginia. The museum features dozens of interactive activity exhibits including an interactive sand table, a water table, an indoor climbing area, and a stop-motion video creation station.

In 2021, a group of Tri-State area community members established a reputable Board of Directors with the intention of creating a children's museum. This board developed a strong volunteer base, obtained its 501(c)3 status, hosted its first fundraiser, and launched the Founding 150 Campaign. The first 150 families, individuals, community groups, and businesses to donate a minimum of $1,000 will forever be acknowledged in the Museum. The Founding 150 Campaign goals were reached in December of 2022. Huntington Children’s Museum moved full steam ahead into 2022 by purchasing a former Shoney's building at 1700 Washington Ave and began renovations. Three years later on July 13, 2024, the museum opens its doors to the public.

== See also ==
- List of museums in Huntington, West Virginia
