= List of neighborhoods in Huntington, West Virginia =

The city of Huntington, West Virginia, contains many neighborhoods, ranging from planned communities to historic wards. There is no uniform standard for what constitutes an individual neighborhood within the city; however, the city of Huntington does recognize a list of 12 neighborhood associations that encompass broadly recognized regions. According to the city, a neighborhood association is a designated area where residents to identify, plan, and set priorities to address the needs and concerns of their community.

Huntington is commonly divided into four main sections, Downtown, East, South, and West. The north-south divider is the CSX railroad tracks, while the east/west divider is First Street. Within those sections, there are many neighborhoods, including:

== Neighborhoods ==
=== Huntington Neighborhood Associations ===
Name	Section
Arlington Park	East
Chancellor Hills	South
Crossroads	South
Enslow Park	South
Fairfield	South
Gallaher Village	West
Highlawn	East
Old Central City	West
South Side	South
Stamford Park	East
West Huntington	West
Westmoreland	West

=== Other recognized neighborhoods ===
Name	Section
Altizer	East
Anita Heights	South
Belmont Park	South
Beverly Hills/South Hills	South
Downtown	Downtown
Freeman Estates	South
Garden Farms	West
Gaylersville	South
Grandview Heights	West
Guyandotte	East
Harveytown	South
Marcum Terrace	South
Marshall University Campus	Downtown
Reid	South
Ridgewood	South
Southeast Hills	South
Walnut Hills	East

== See also ==
- Cityscape of Huntington, West Virginia
