= Z. D. Ramsdell House =

Historic house in West Virginia, United States

- U.S. National Register of Historic Places
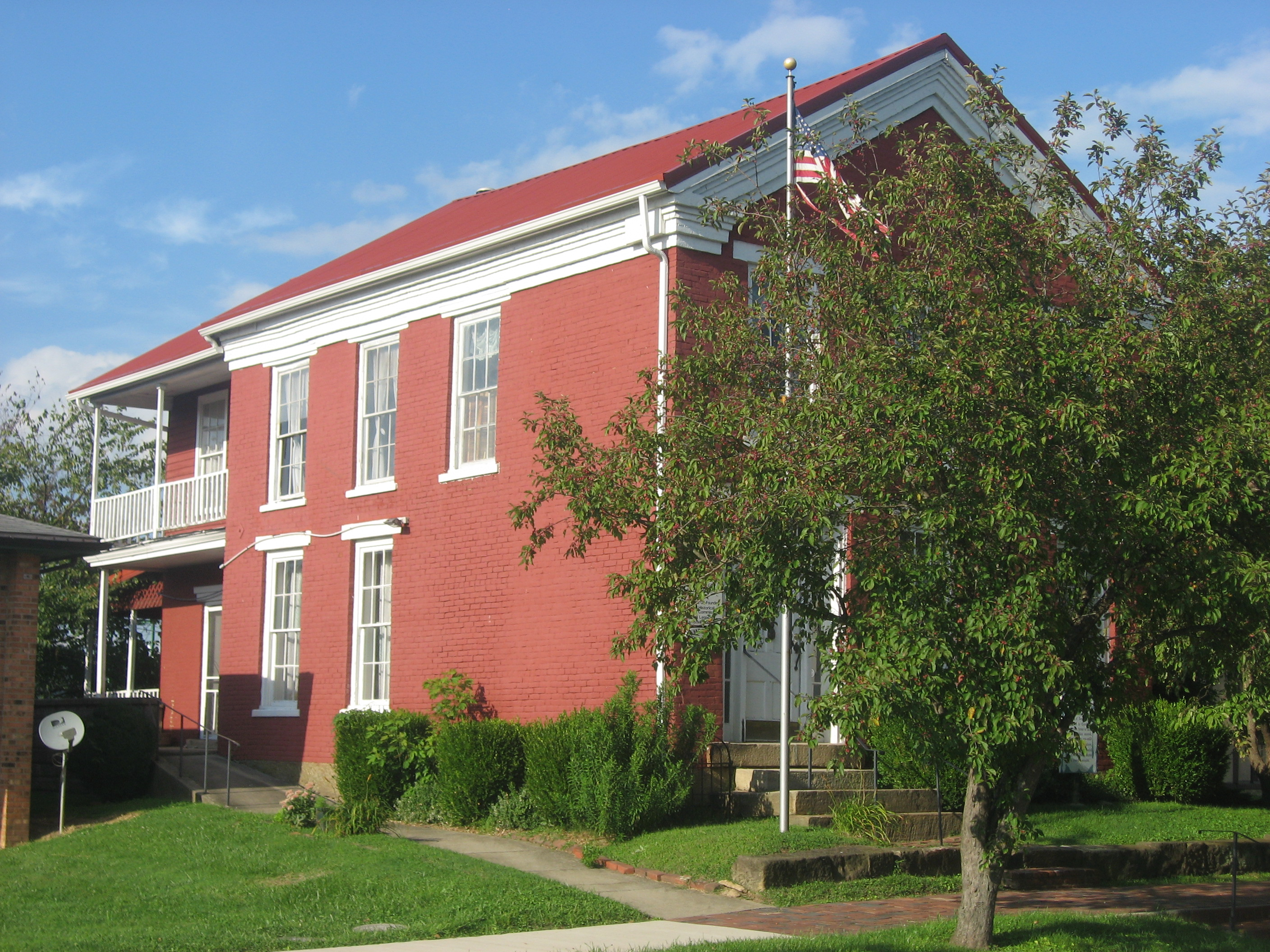
- Front and western side

- Location within West Virginia Location within the United States
- Location: 1108 B St., Ceredo, West Virginia
- Coordinates: 38°23′50″N 82°33′18″W
- Area: 0.5 acres (0.20 ha)
- Built: 1857
- Architect: Chase Brothers Contractors, Denney Shine
- Architectural style: Greek Revival
- NRHP reference No.: 83003254
- Added to NRHP: August 18, 1983

Z. D. Ramsdell House, also known as The Ramsdell House, is a historic home located at Ceredo, Wayne County, West Virginia, atop a mound claimed to be an Indian burial mound. It was built in 1857–1858, and is a two-story red brick and frame dwelling measuring 30 feet wide and 48 feet deep. It sits on a stone foundation and is in the Greek Revival-style with a gable roof. Zophar D. Ramsdell came to Ceredo at the invitation of the town's founder, and fellow abolitionist, Eli Thayer. He built a shoe and boot factory, served as a Captain and Quartermaster during the American Civil War, served as a postmaster after the war, and served as a legislative representative in the West Virginia State Senate during 1868 and 1869. The home is believed to be one of the last stops of the Underground Railroad before crossing the Ohio River to freedom. It is open as a historic house museum.

It was listed on the National Register of Historic Places in 1983, and was acquired by the Town of Ceredo, who currently owns and maintains it.

== See also ==
- List of museums in Huntington, West Virginia
