= List of municipalities in West Virginia =

West Virginia is a state located in the Southern United States. There are 230 municipalities.

== Cities ==
Largest municipalities in West Virginia by population

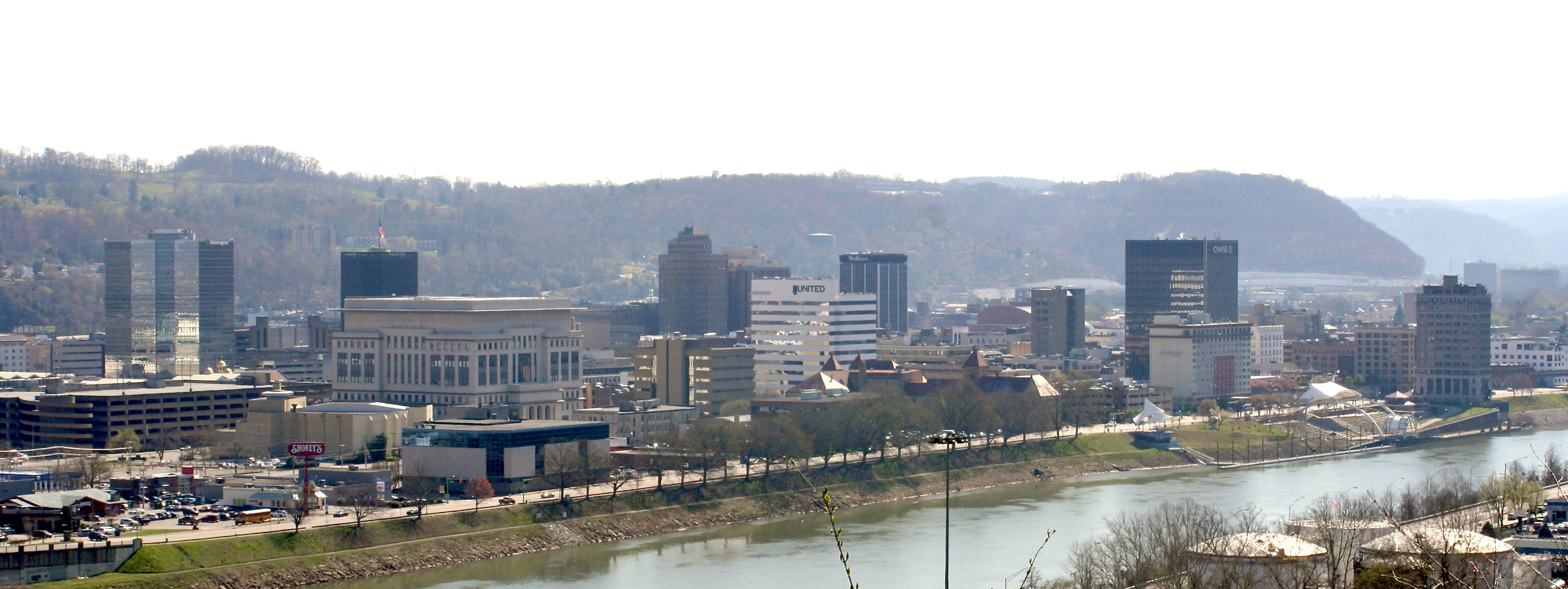
Charleston, the capital of West Virginia and its most populous city

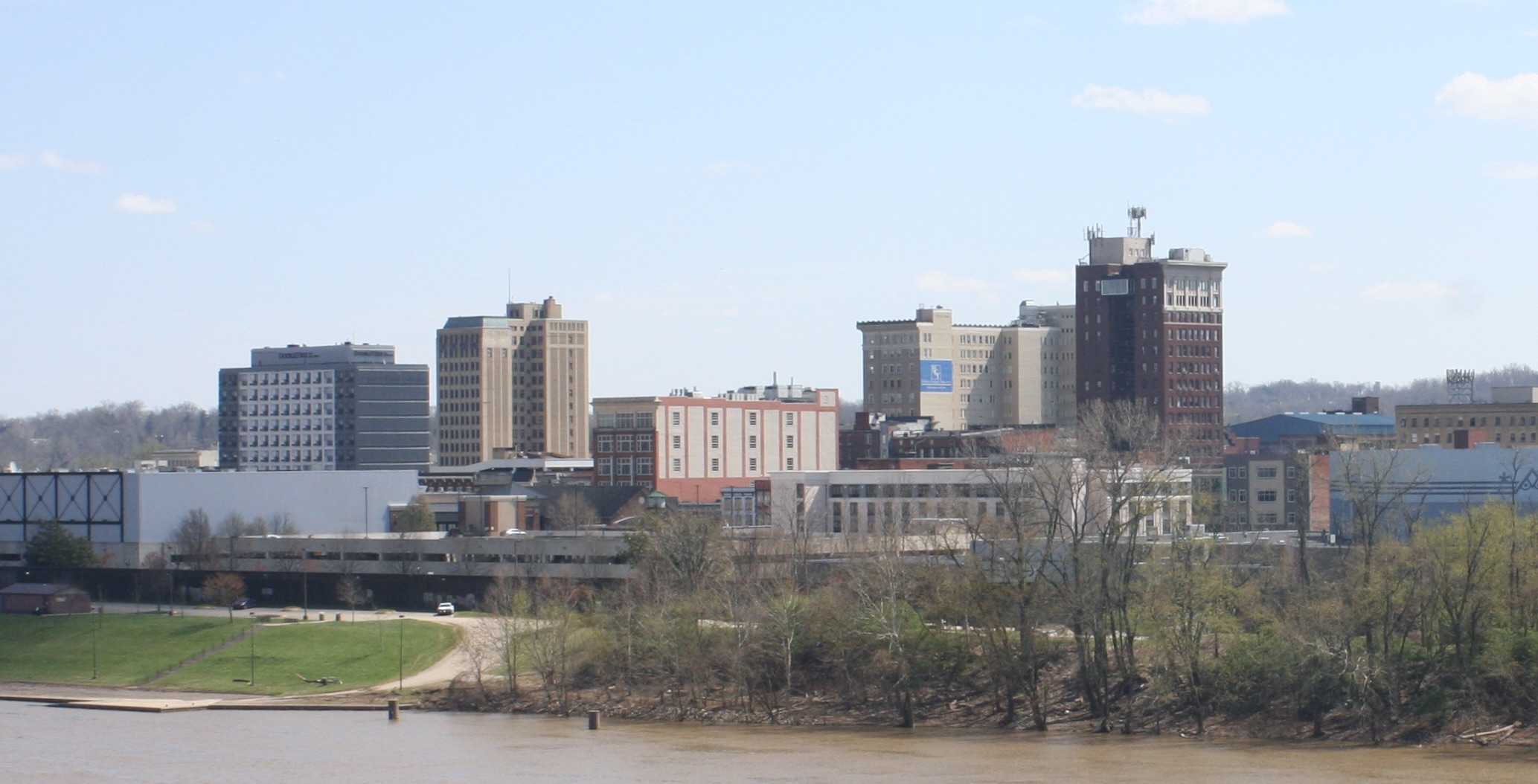
Huntington

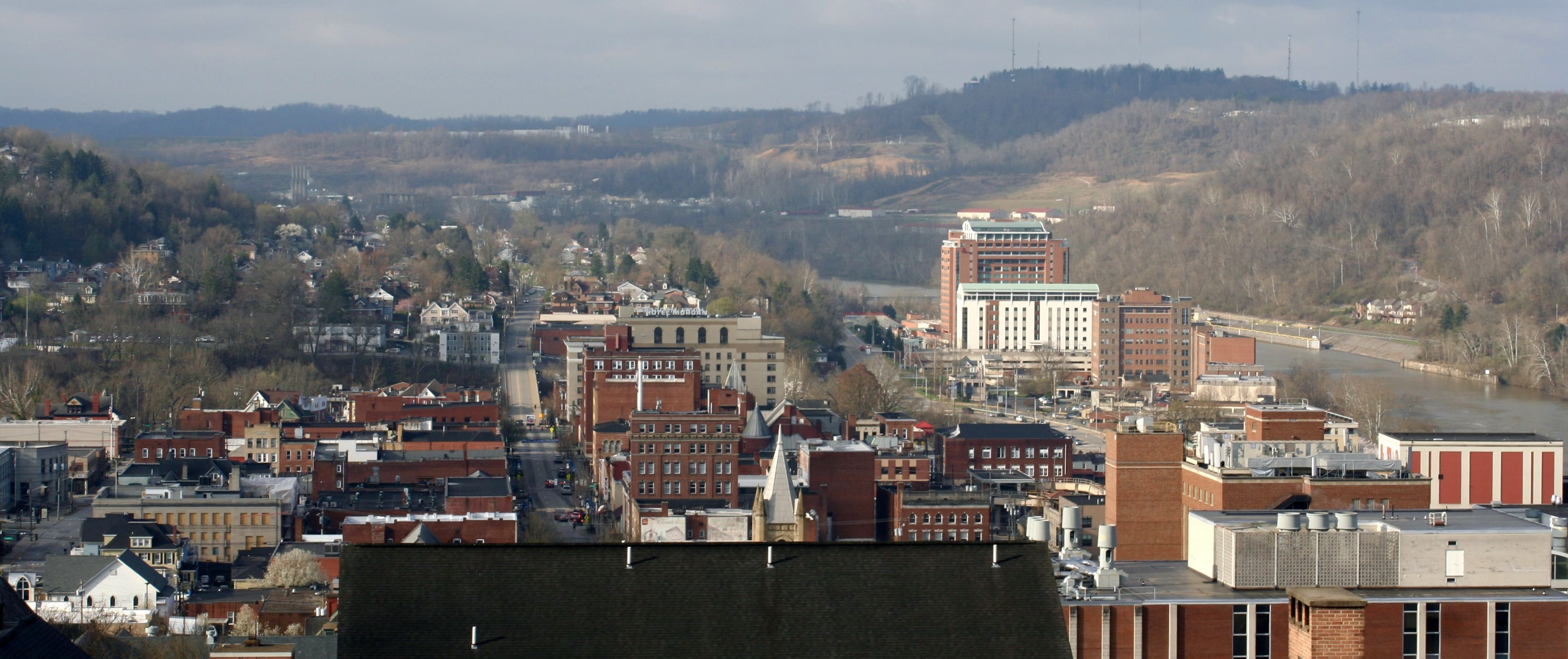
Morgantown

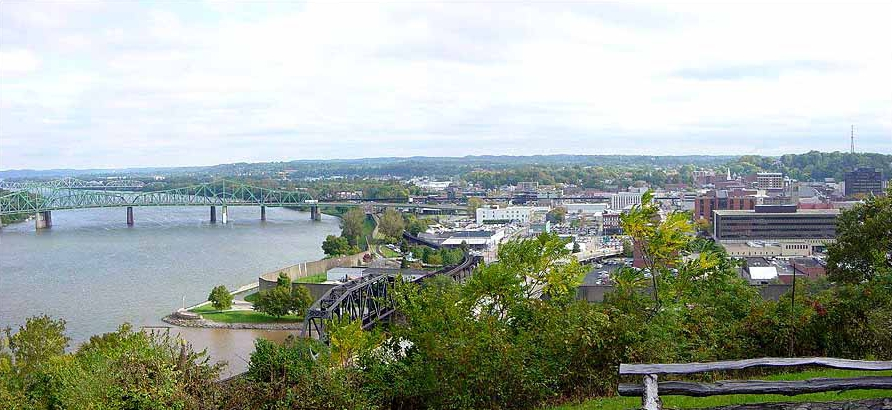
Parkersburg

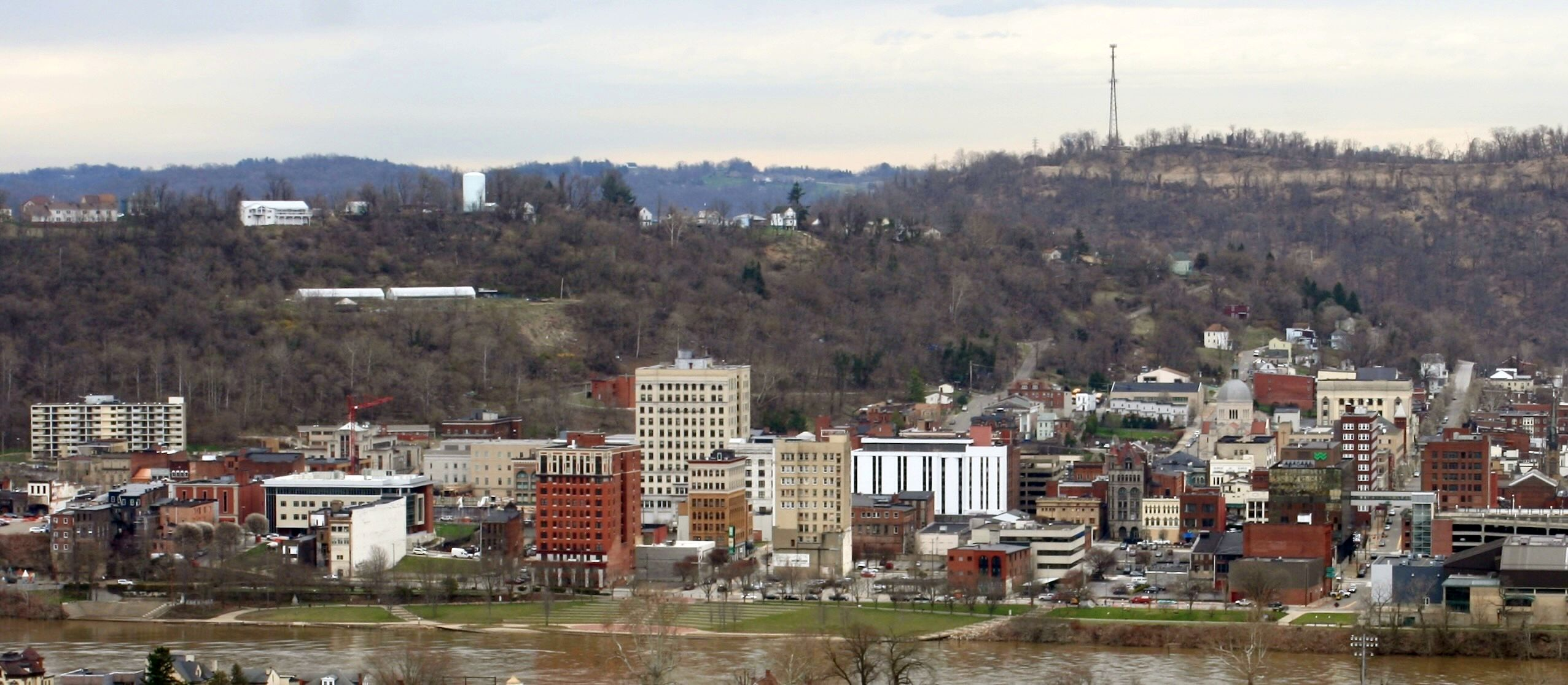
Wheeling

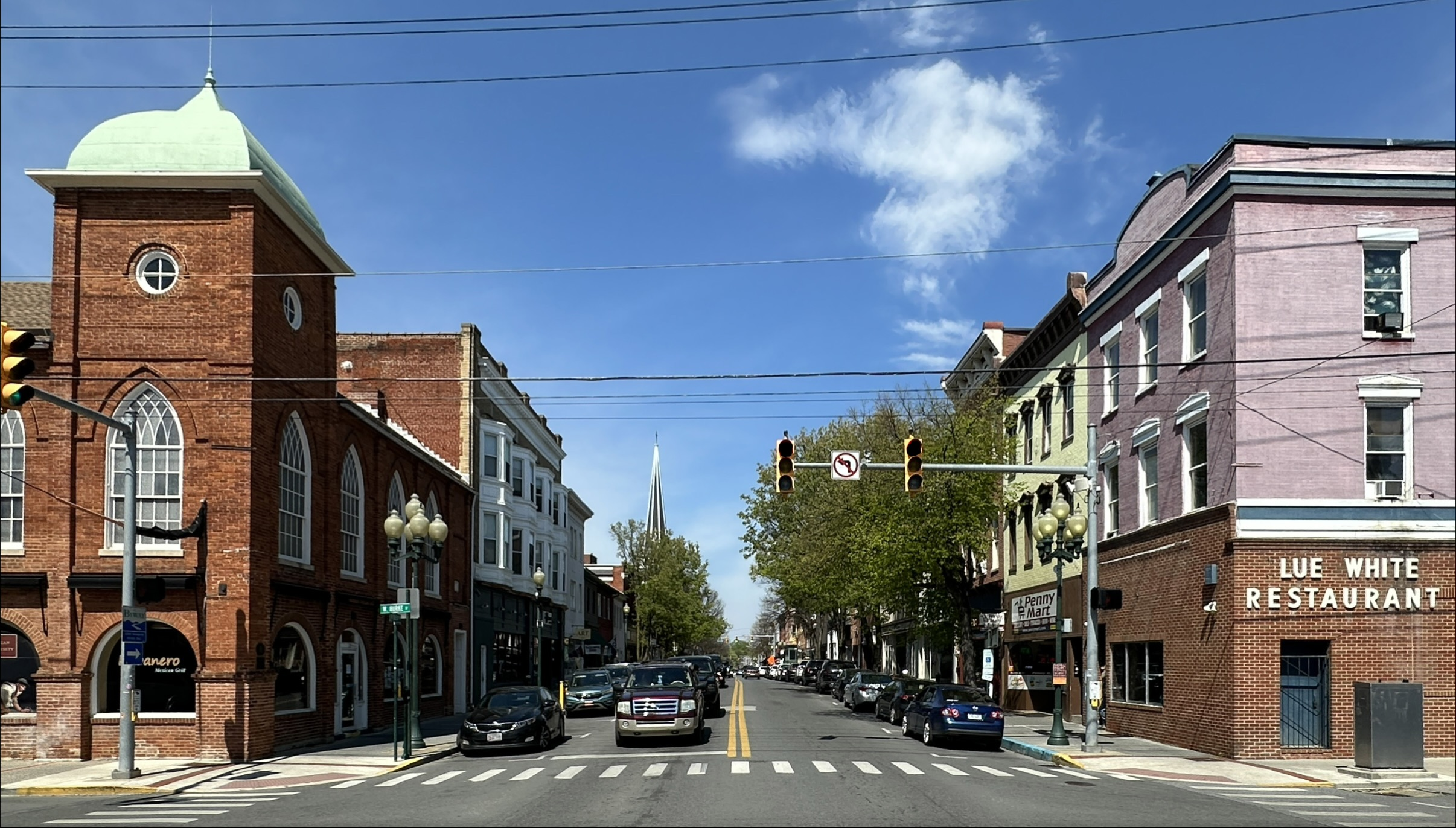
Martinsburg

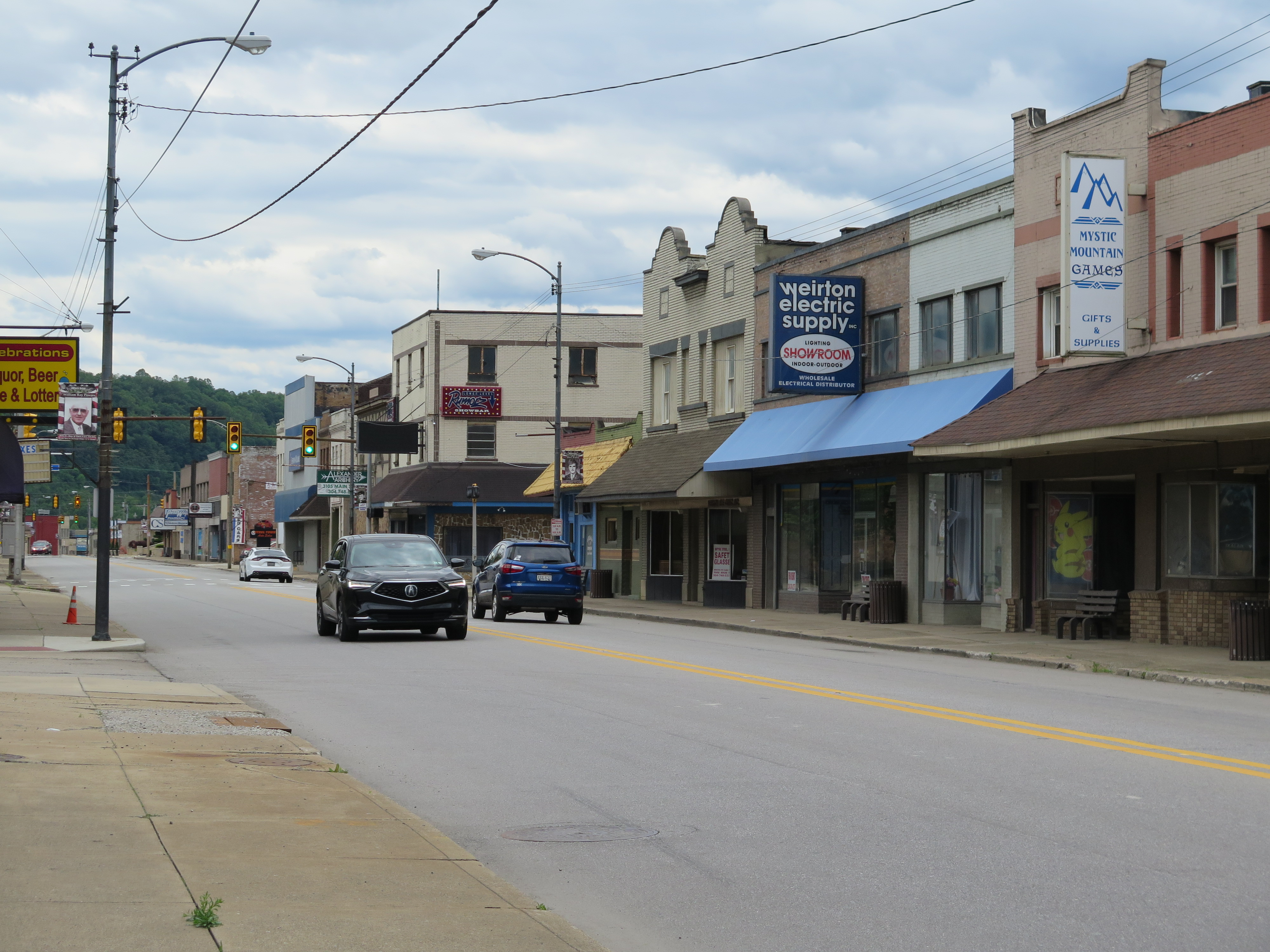
Weirton

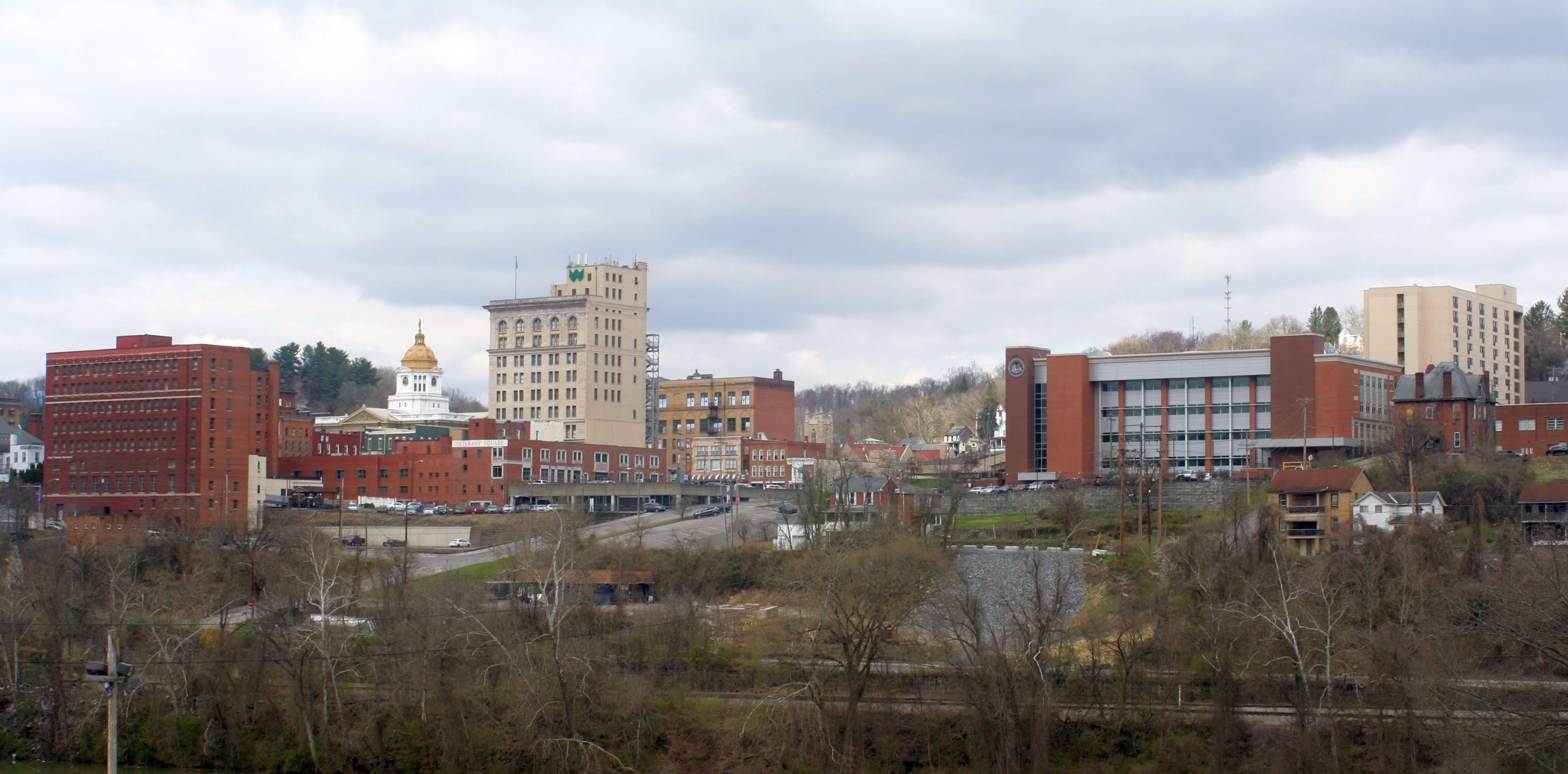
Fairmont

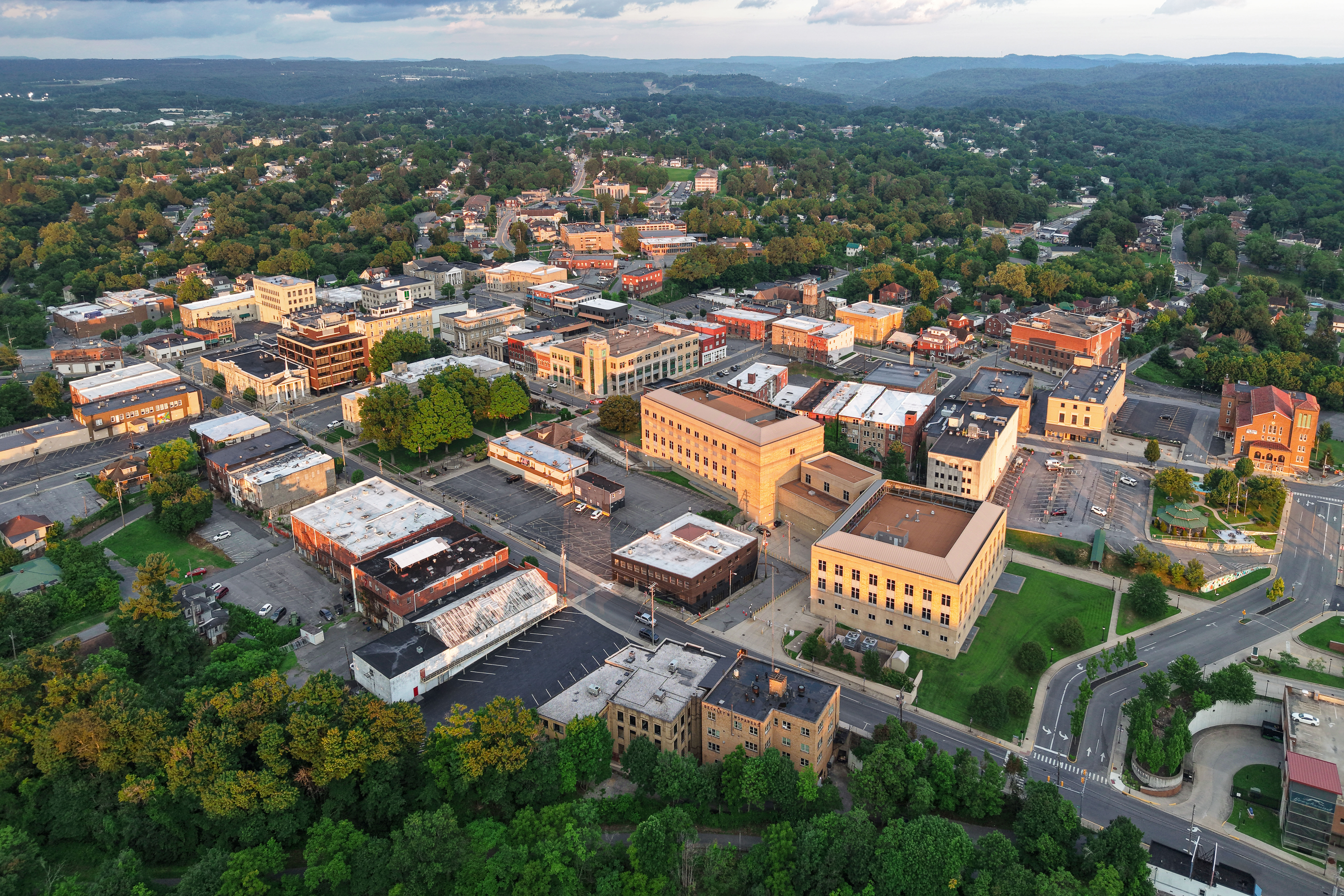
Beckley

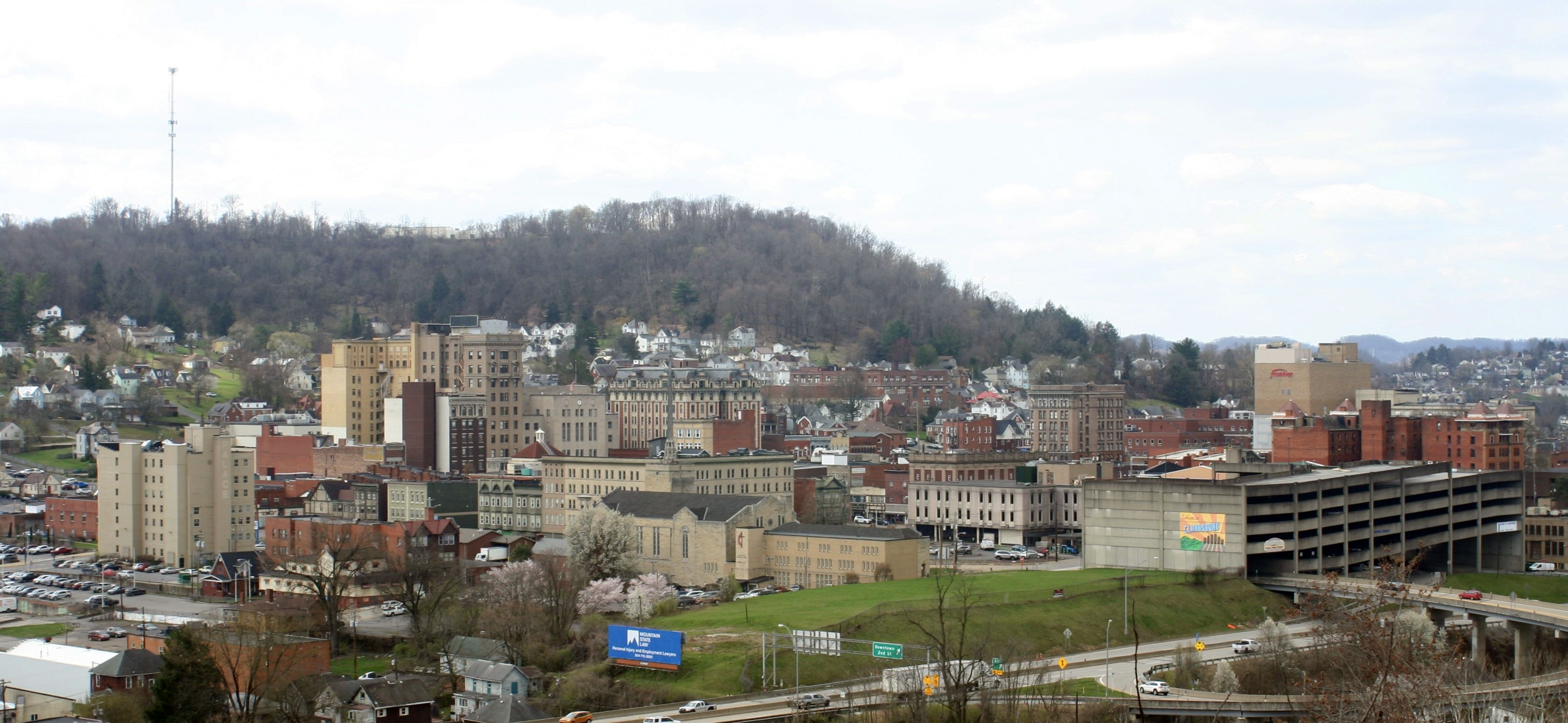
Clarksburg

== List of municipalities ==
County seat
State capital and county seat

Map of the United States with West Virginia highlighted

2024 Rank	Municipalities	Type	2024 Estimate	2020 Census	Change	County
1	Charleston ††	City	46,482	48,864	−4.87%	Kanawha
2	Huntington †	City	44,942	46,842	−4.06%	Cabell; Wayne
3	Morgantown †	City	30,490	30,347	+0.47%	Monongalia
4	Parkersburg †	City	28,834	29,738	−3.04%	Wood
5	Wheeling †	City	26,060	27,052	−3.67%	Ohio; Marshall
6	Martinsburg †	City	19,047	18,777	+1.44%	Berkeley
7	Weirton	City	18,317	19,163	−4.41%	Hancock; Brooke
8	Fairmont †	City	18,063	18,416	−1.92%	Marion
9	Beckley †	City	16,515	17,286	−4.46%	Raleigh
10	Clarksburg †	City	15,262	16,061	−4.97%	Harrison
11	South Charleston	City	13,177	13,647	−3.44%	Kanawha
12	Vienna	City	10,406	10,652	−2.31%	Wood
13	St. Albans	City	10,301	10,861	−5.16%	Kanawha
14	Bridgeport	City	9,397	9,336	+0.65%	Harrison
15	Bluefield	City	9,157	9,658	−5.19%	Mercer
16	Charles Town †	City	8,869	6,534	+35.74%	Jefferson
17	Oak Hill	City	7,732	8,179	−5.47%	Fayette
18	Moundsville †	City	7,703	8,093	−4.82%	Marshall
19	Dunbar	City	7,111	7,480	−4.93%	Kanawha
20	Hurricane	City	6,813	6,961	−2.13%	Putnam
21	Elkins †	City	6,698	6,934	−3.40%	Randolph
22	Nitro	City	6,366	6,624	−3.89%	Kanawha; Putnam
23	Ranson	City	6,035	5,433	+11.08%	Jefferson
24	Princeton †	City	5,595	5,872	−4.72%	Mercer
25	Buckhannon †	City	5,049	5,186	−2.64%	Upshur
26	New Martinsville †	City	5,038	5,204	−3.19%	Wetzel
27	Keyser †	City	4,802	4,864	−1.27%	Mineral
28	Grafton †	City	4,575	4,722	−3.11%	Taylor
29	Barboursville	Village	4,326	4,456	−2.92%	Cabell
30	Westover	City	4,088	3,955	+3.36%	Monongalia
31	Point Pleasant †	City	3,886	4,070	−4.52%	Mason
32	Ravenswood	City	3,821	3,865	−1.14%	Jackson
33	Lewisburg †	City	3,765	3,922	−4.00%	Greenbrier
34	Weston †	City	3,758	3,952	−4.91%	Lewis
35	Pleasant Valley	City	3,470	3,498	−0.80%	Marion
36	Welch †	City	3,413	3,590	−4.93%	McDowell
37	Summersville †	City	3,326	3,431	−3.06%	Nicholas
38	Ripley †	City	3,067	3,079	−0.39%	Jackson
39	Kingwood †	City	2,953	2,980	−0.91%	Preston
40	Williamstown	City	2,951	2,997	−1.53%	Wood
41	Kenova	City	2,877	3,033	−5.14%	Wayne
42	Philippi †	City	2,845	2,929	−2.87%	Barbour
43	Milton	Town	2,799	2,811	−0.43%	Cabell
44	Williamson †	City	2,779	3,083	−9.86%	Mingo
45	Fayetteville †	Town	2,753	2,887	−4.64%	Fayette
46	Madison †	City	2,719	2,913	−6.66%	Boone
47	Follansbee	City	2,686	2,848	−5.69%	Brooke
48	Moorefield †	Town	2,679	2,524	+6.14%	Hardy
49	Bethlehem	Village	2,563	2,605	−1.61%	Ohio
50	Winfield †	Town	2,428	2,393	+1.46%	Putnam
51	Paden City	City	2,388	2,541	−6.02%	Wetzel; Tyler
52	Wellsburg †	City	2,280	2,450	−6.94%	Brooke
53	Petersburg †	City	2,277	2,284	−0.31%	Grant
54	Shinnston	City	2,258	2,328	−3.01%	Harrison
55	Hinton †	City	2,159	2,245	−3.83%	Summers
56	White Sulphur Springs	City	2,154	2,221	−3.02%	Greenbrier
57	Chester	City	2,105	2,208	−4.66%	Hancock
58	Spencer †	City	1,936	2,063	−6.16%	Roane
59	Mannington	City	1,909	1,952	−2.20%	Marion
60	Star City	Town	1,803	1,779	+1.35%	Monongalia
61	Belington	Town	1,795	1,805	−0.55%	Barbour
62	Romney †	City	1,755	1,724	+1.80%	Hampshire
63	St. Marys †	City	1,749	1,831	−4.48%	Pleasants
64	Stonewood	City	1,748	1,798	−2.78%	Harrison
65	Richwood	City	1,607	1,660	−3.19%	Nicholas
66	McMechen	City	1,604	1,697	−5.48%	Marshall
67	Harrisville †	Town	1,547	1,631	−5.15%	Ritchie
68	Shepherdstown	Town	1,524	1,531	−0.46%	Jefferson
69	Eleanor	Town	1,523	1,542	−1.23%	Putnam
70	Ronceverte	City	1,510	1,572	−3.94%	Greenbrier
71	Salem	City	1,474	1,529	−3.60%	Harrison
72	Nutter Fort	Town	1,450	1,493	−2.88%	Harrison
73	West Liberty	Town	1,434	1,454	−1.38%	Ohio
74	Marmet	City	1,423	1,504	−5.39%	Kanawha
75	New Haven	Town	1,414	1,476	−4.20%	Mason
76	Glen Dale	City	1,413	1,496	−5.55%	Marshall
77	Terra Alta	Town	1,413	1,415	−0.14%	Preston
78	Wayne †	Town	1,394	1,443	−3.40%	Wayne
79	Granville	Town	1,378	1,355	+1.70%	Monongalia
80	Oceana	Town	1,376	1,449	−5.04%	Wyoming
81	Mullens	City	1,357	1,480	−8.31%	Wyoming
82	Ceredo	City	1,334	1,408	−5.26%	Wayne
83	Logan †	City	1,319	1,439	−8.34%	Logan
84	Sistersville	City	1,309	1,412	−7.29%	Tyler
85	Ansted	Town	1,288	1,303	−1.15%	Fayette
86	Parsons †	City	1,287	1,327	−3.01%	Tucker
87	Chesapeake	Town	1,281	1,335	−4.04%	Kanawha
88	Mabscott	Town	1,278	1,341	−4.70%	Raleigh
89	Mount Hope	City	1,252	1,125	+11.29%	Fayette
90	Benwood	City	1,204	1,252	−3.83%	Marshall
91	Buffalo	Town	1,200	1,211	−0.91%	Putnam
92	Montgomery	City	1,198	1,275	−6.04%	Fayette; Kanawha
93	Barrackville	Town	1,197	1,201	−0.33%	Marion
94	Rainelle	Town	1,190	1,190	0.00%	Greenbrier
95	Athens	Town	1,178	962	+22.45%	Mercer
96	Belle	Town	1,097	1,169	−6.16%	Kanawha
97	Sophia	Town	1,081	1,130	−4.34%	Raleigh
98	Glenville †	Town	1,054	1,129	−6.64%	Gilmer
99	Monongah	Town	1,046	965	+8.39%	Marion
100	Pennsboro	City	1,009	1,054	−4.27%	Ritchie
101	Bolivar	Town	989	1,036	−4.54%	Jefferson
102	New Cumberland †	City	974	1,020	−4.51%	Hancock
103	Hamlin †	Town	973	1,039	−6.35%	Lincoln
104	Marlinton †	Town	954	998	−4.41%	Pocahontas
105	Chapmanville	Town	946	1,020	−7.25%	Logan
106	Alderson	Town	933	975	−4.31%	Greenbrier; Monroe
107	Poca	Town	869	874	−0.57%	Putnam
108	Clendenin	Town	866	854	+1.41%	Kanawha
109	Carpendale	Town	842	860	−2.09%	Mineral
110	Mason	Town	834	866	−3.70%	Mason
111	Rupert	Town	834	877	−4.90%	Greenbrier
112	Belmont	City	822	875	−6.06%	Pleasants
113	Sutton †	Town	821	863	−4.87%	Braxton
114	Cameron	City	818	861	−4.99%	Marshall
115	North Hills	Town	812	834	−2.64%	Wood
116	Rivesville	Town	808	828	−2.42%	Marion
117	East Bank	Town	781	822	−4.99%	Kanawha
118	Bethany	Town	753	781	−3.59%	Brooke
119	Berkeley Springs (Bath) †	Town	752	753	−0.13%	Morgan
120	Gassaway	Town	725	759	−4.48%	Braxton
121	Man	Town	717	772	−7.12%	Logan
122	White Hall	Town	704	700	+0.57%	Marion
123	Smithers	City	703	754	−6.76%	Fayette; Kanawha
124	Piedmont	Town	696	718	−3.06%	Mineral
125	Lumberport	Town	692	717	−3.49%	Harrison
126	Gary	City	687	773	−11.13%	McDowell
127	Glasgow	Town	687	703	−2.28%	Kanawha
128	Cedar Grove	Town	685	718	−4.60%	Kanawha
129	Elizabeth †	Town	681	724	−5.94%	Wirt
130	Webster Springs (Addison) †	Town	679	731	−7.11%	Webster
131	Middlebourne †	Town	671	717	−6.42%	Tyler
132	Grant Town	Town	669	685	−2.34%	Marion
133	Triadelphia	Town	662	669	−1.05%	Ohio
134	Fort Gay	Town	656	675	−2.81%	Wayne
135	Pineville †	Town	654	645	+1.40%	Wyoming
136	West Union †	Town	643	653	−1.53%	Doddridge
137	Danville	Town	636	672	−5.36%	Boone
138	Thomas	City	593	611	−2.95%	Tucker
139	Davis	Town	578	600	−3.67%	Tucker
140	Beverly	Town	574	622	−7.72%	Randolph
141	Ridgeley	Town	574	591	−2.88%	Mineral
142	War	City	546	623	−12.36%	McDowell
143	Franklin †	Town	540	495	+9.09%	Pendleton
144	Mill Creek	Town	538	560	−3.93%	Randolph
145	Reedsville	Town	527	530	−0.57%	Preston
146	Gauley Bridge	Town	521	553	−5.79%	Fayette
147	Beech Bottom	Village	516	553	−6.69%	Brooke
148	Masontown	Town	507	510	−0.59%	Preston
149	Anmoore	Town	503	513	−1.95%	Harrison
150	Hartford City	Town	499	503	−0.80%	Mason
151	West Hamlin	Town	495	524	−5.53%	Lincoln
152	Cowen	Town	466	487	−4.31%	Webster
153	Grantsville †	Town	463	494	−6.28%	Calhoun
154	Pratt	Town	461	483	−4.55%	Kanawha
155	Clearview	Village	457	472	−3.18%	Ohio
156	West Milford	Town	454	449	+1.11%	Harrison
157	Peterstown	Town	452	448	+0.89%	Monroe
158	Rowlesburg	Town	433	438	−1.14%	Preston
159	Capon Bridge	Town	426	420	+1.43%	Hampshire
160	Union †	Town	417	419	−0.48%	Monroe
161	Paw Paw	Town	410	410	0.00%	Morgan
162	Jane Lew	Town	399	408	−2.21%	Lewis
163	Farmington	Town	393	392	+0.26%	Marion
164	Delbarton	Town	388	422	−8.06%	Mingo
165	Junior	Town	378	384	−1.56%	Barbour
166	Burnsville	Town	377	394	−4.31%	Braxton
167	Matewan	Town	374	412	−9.22%	Mingo
168	Bancroft	Town	372	387	−3.88%	Putnam
169	Clay †	Town	371	396	−6.31%	Clay
170	West Logan	Town	370	399	−7.27%	Logan
171	Fairview	Town	369	373	−1.07%	Marion
172	Lost Creek	Town	342	359	−4.74%	Harrison
173	Whitesville	Town	342	361	−5.26%	Boone
174	Pine Grove	Town	340	363	−6.34%	Wetzel
175	Windsor Heights	Village	339	361	−6.09%	Brooke
176	Lester	Town	333	338	−1.48%	Raleigh
177	Meadow Bridge	Town	311	324	−4.01%	Fayette
178	Flemington	Town	307	309	−0.65%	Taylor
179	Gilbert	Town	303	333	−9.01%	Mingo
180	Hedgesville	Town	299	300	−0.33%	Berkeley
181	Mitchell Heights	Town	292	314	−7.01%	Logan
182	Tunnelton	Town	292	296	−1.35%	Preston
183	Kermit	Town	289	317	−8.83%	Mingo
184	Valley Grove	Village	271	275	−1.45%	Ohio
185	Bramwell	Town	263	276	−4.71%	Mercer
186	Harpers Ferry	Town	263	269	−2.23%	Jefferson
187	Wardensville	Town	260	269	−3.35%	Hardy
188	Newburg	Town	258	259	−0.39%	Preston
189	Flatwoods	Town	255	264	−3.41%	Braxton
190	Ellenboro	Town	248	221	+12.22%	Ritchie
191	Kimball	Town	248	145	+71.03%	McDowell
192	Albright	Town	246	249	−1.20%	Preston
193	Durbin	Town	243	231	+5.19%	Pocahontas
194	Iaeger	Town	243	257	−5.45%	McDowell
195	Hundred	Town	242	255	−5.10%	Wetzel
196	Hillsboro	Town	225	232	−3.02%	Pocahontas
197	Hambleton	Town	222	218	+1.83%	Tucker
198	Henderson	Town	222	228	−2.63%	Mason
199	Handley	Town	212	223	−4.93%	Kanawha
200	Bayard	Town	210	201	+4.48%	Grant
201	Elk Garden	Town	208	212	−1.89%	Mineral
202	Hendricks	Town	208	228	−8.77%	Tucker
203	Quinwood	Town	207	222	−6.76%	Greenbrier
204	Northfork	Town	205	231	−11.26%	McDowell
205	Davy	Town	185	209	−11.48%	McDowell
206	Bradshaw	Town	182	207	−12.08%	McDowell
207	Womelsdorf (Coalton)	Town	179	189	−5.29%	Randolph
208	Worthington	Town	173	179	−3.35%	Marion
209	Sand Fork	Town	169	180	−6.11%	Gilmer
210	Cairo	Town	168	176	−4.55%	Ritchie
211	Falling Spring	Town	166	170	−2.35%	Greenbrier
212	Huttonsville	Town	157	163	−3.68%	Randolph
213	Keystone	City	153	176	−13.07%	McDowell
214	Sylvester	Town	151	171	−11.70%	Boone
215	Anawalt	Town	148	165	−10.30%	McDowell
216	Reedy	Town	144	150	−4.00%	Roane
217	Montrose	Town	138	145	−4.83%	Randolph
218	Pullman	Town	133	135	−1.48%	Ritchie
219	Leon	Town	130	137	−5.11%	Mason
220	Oakvale	Town	130	133	−2.26%	Mercer
221	Brandonville	Town	128	129	−0.78%	Preston
222	Camden-on-Gauley	Town	120	126	−4.76%	Webster
223	Pax	Town	120	136	−11.76%	Fayette
224	Blacksville	Town	119	118	+0.85%	Monongalia
225	Smithfield	Town	98	103	−4.85%	Wetzel
226	Friendly	Town	94	101	−6.93%	Tyler
227	Harman	Town	92	95	−3.16%	Randolph
228	Auburn	Town	76	79	−3.80%	Ritchie
229	Bruceton Mills	Town	63	63	0.00%	Preston
230	Thurmond	Town	2	5	−60.00%	Fayette

== Former towns ==
These communities were once towns but disincorporated.

- Dunlow
- East Lynn
- Jefferson
- Littleton
- Rhodell
- Institute

== See also ==
- List of census-designated places in West Virginia
