= Cammack House =

Historic house in Huntington, West Virginia, United States

- U.S. National Register of Historic Places
- The Cammack House in 2015.

- Location within West Virginia Location within the United States
- Location: 1020 13th Avenue, Huntington, West Virginia 25701
- Coordinates: 38°24′33.12″N 82°26′16.656″W
- Architectural style: Tudor Revival
- NRHP reference No.: 90001774
- Added to NRHP: 1990

The Cammack House, is a historic home located next to the Campbell House, in the Ritter Park Historic District in Huntington, West Virginia.

Facing Ritter Park, the Cammack House was built in 1923. It is a three-story, Tudor Revival dwelling, including a one-and-one-half-story garage.

It was listed on the National Register of Historic Places in 1990.

== See also ==
- National Register of Historic Places listings in Cabell County, West Virginia
