= Huntington Museum of Art =

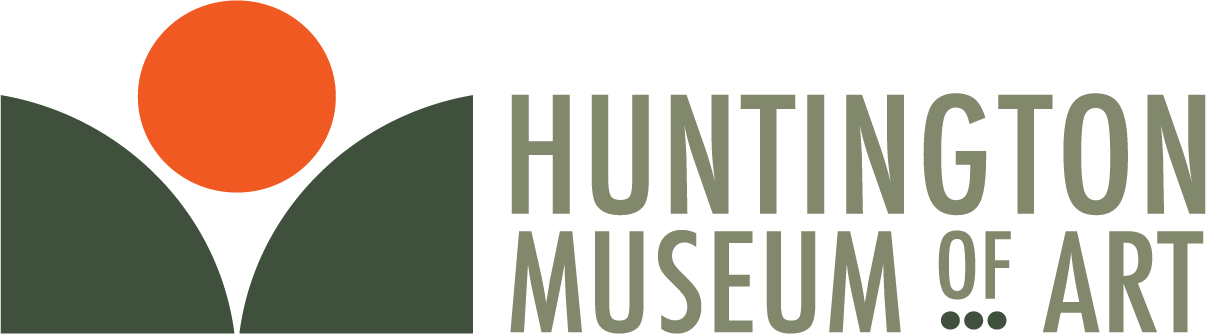

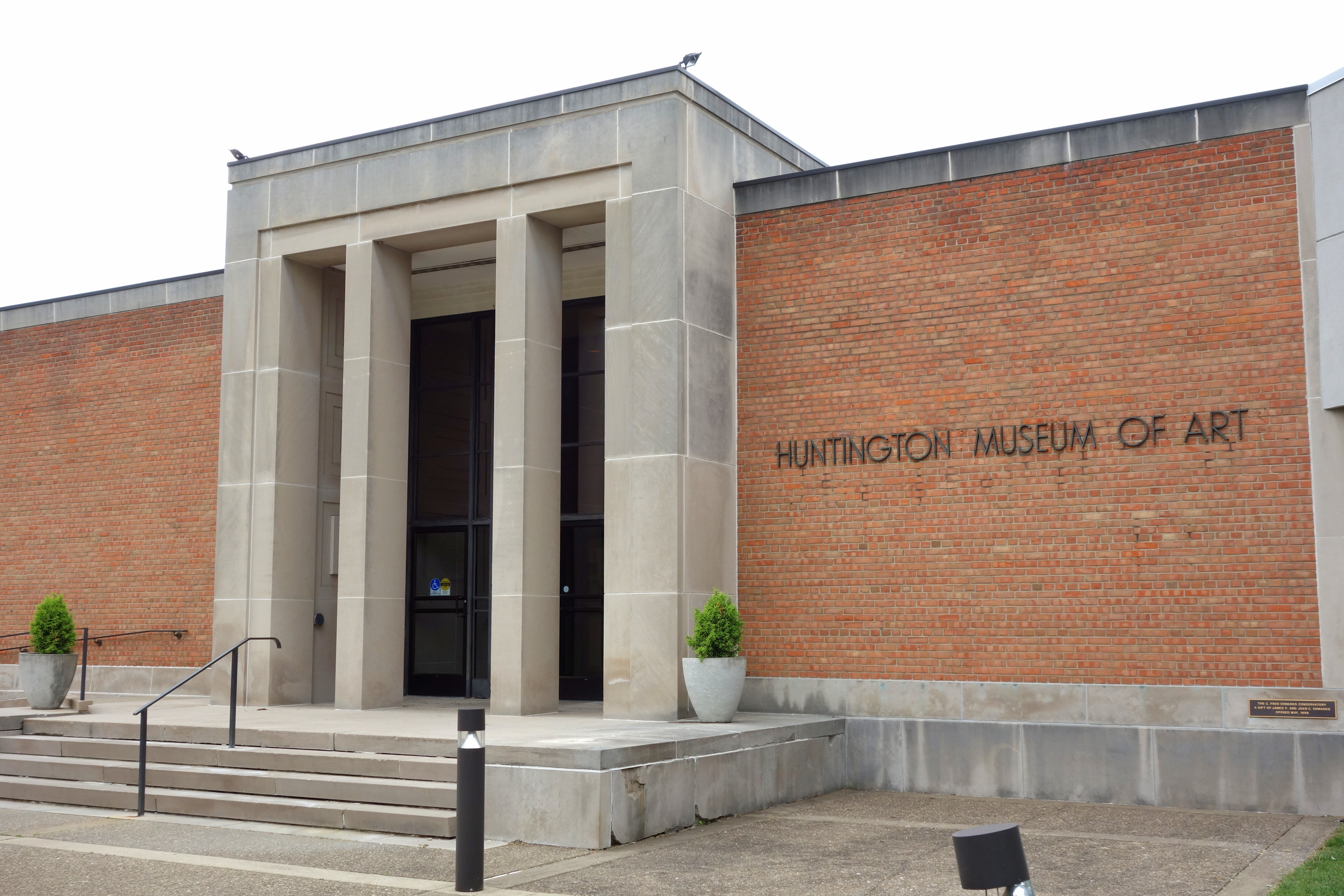
- Huntington Museum of Art
- Interactive fullscreen map
- Established: 1947; opened 1952
- Location: 2033 McCoy Road; Huntington, West Virginia
- Coordinates: 38°23′35″N 82°26′02″W
- Type: Art museum
- Visitors: 50,000+ annually
- Director: Elizabeth “Liz” Simmons
- Curator: John Farley
- Website: www.hmoa.org

The Huntington Museum of Art is a nationally accredited art museum located in the Park Hills neighborhood above Ritter Park in Huntington, West Virginia. Housed on over 50 acres of land and occupying almost 60,000 square feet, it is the largest art museum in the state of West Virginia. The museum's campus is home to nature trails and the C. Fred Edwards Conservatory, a subtropical and tropical plant conservatory. The museum's collection includes American and European paintings, sculptures, prints, and drawings, as well as glass pieces manufactured in West Virginia and the Ohio Valley, American folk art, Chinese and Japanese decorative objects, Haitian art, firearms, and decorative arts from the Near East. In addition to its permanent collections, the museum hosts traveling exhibitions and houses the James D. Francis Art Research Library, the Grace Rardin Doherty Auditorium, and five art studios where artists in residence are periodically hosted and classes are held. The Huntington Museum of Art holds one of the largest collections of art in the state of West Virginia.

== History ==
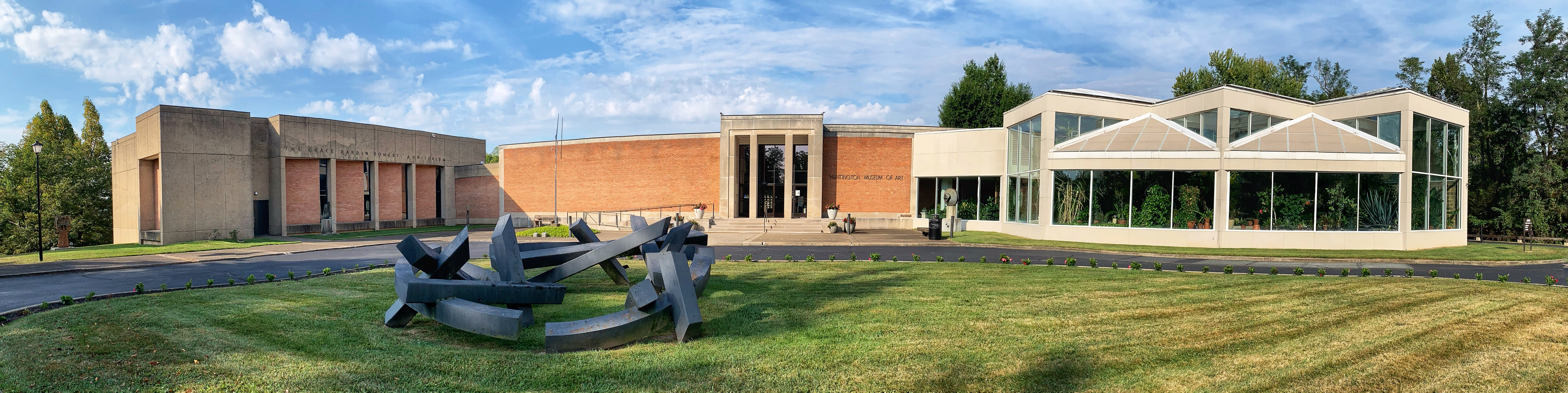

The Huntington Museum of Art was organized in 1947 and officially opened on 9 November 1952 under the name The Huntington Galleries. The institution was renamed the Huntington Museum of Art in 1987. The original building was constructed on a 52-acre plot donated by Herbert Fitzpatrick who also donated his personal art collection to begin the museum's collection. This donation of more than 400 objects included a mixture of fine arts and decorative arts, among which were paintings and prints, sculptures, British silver, rugs, and Asian decorative objects. Also on display during the opening of the museum was the Dean Firearms Collection, then loaned to the museum by Herman Dean, a member of the first board of the museum. The collection was later gifted to the museum and is now on permanent display.

In the mid-1960s the museum was enlarged through a gift from the Henry L. and Grace Rardin Doherty Foundation, which included construction of the Grace Rardin Doherty Auditorium, the Francis Art Library, large new galleries and a second building containing three studios. All of this work was designed by famed architect and founder of the Bauhaus, Walter Gropius, and his firm The Architects Collaborative. Through the efforts of the Rardin Foundation, two more studios would be added in the mid-1970s and in the mid-1990s a new gallery was added to house the Near Eastern collection donated by the Touma Family (and others). At the same time, the C. Fred Edwards Conservatory was added to the museum through the gift of local philanthropist, Joan C. Edwards, and additional office space was created.

Following the death of Huntington native Isabelle Gwynn Daine (1913–2004), the museum received a large bequest to support the construction of a new exhibition gallery to honor the memory of her and her husband, Robert Daine. The new gallery was completed in 2010. In addition to the fund bequeathed to the museum to build the gallery, Mrs. Daine also left an endowment to support exhibitions at the museum.

== Educational programming ==
=== The Walter Gropius Master Artist Program ===
The Walter Gropius Master Artist Program is the primary visiting artist program at the Huntington Museum of Art. The first artist to teach in the program was the painter Robert Cottingham in 1992. The program was initially funded from the Estate of Roxanna Y. Booth, who was interested in the development of an art education program based upon the teachings of Walter Gropius. Booth's late son, Alex Booth, contributed to its development. Depending on the year, the museum has hosted between three and six artists. As part of each Master Artist's visit, the museum presents an exhibition of their work, a lecture regarding their creative process (which is open to the general public), and a hands-on workshop in the museum's free-standing studios.

=== Museum Making Connections ===
Museum Making Connections (MMC) is the overarching educational program of the Huntington Museum of Art. Containing nine distinct programming areas, the programs endeavor to offer adults and children opportunities that are not always readily available in rural and underserved communities. They include activities that occur both on-site at the museum, as well as off-site, including at local and regional elementary schools and after-school locations. Approximately 28,000 individuals take part in this programming annually.

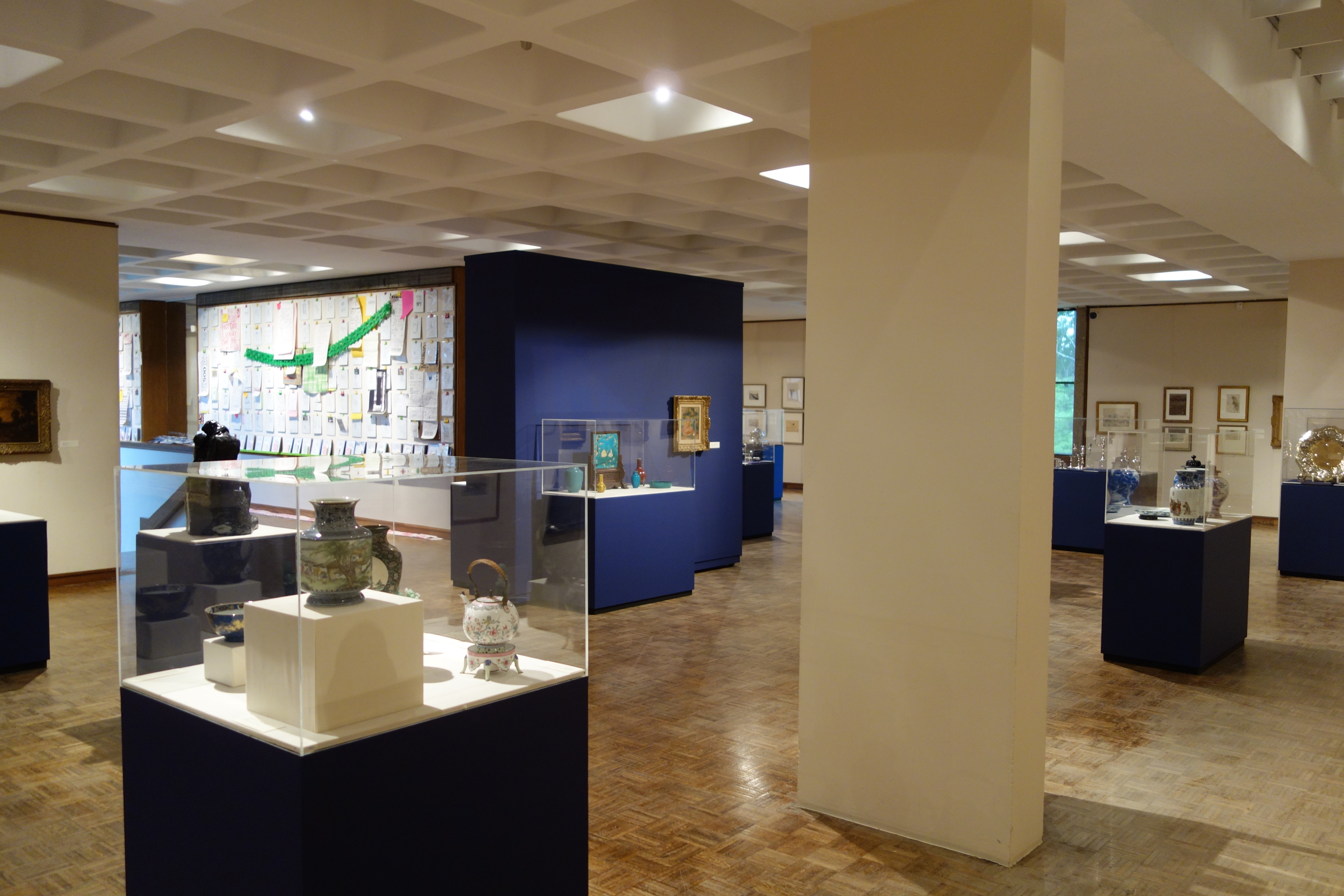
Interior view – Huntington Museum of Art

== Collections ==
The Huntington Museum of Art's collection encompasses nearly 17,000 artworks, making it the largest collection of art in the state. The greatest portion of these works were donated to the museum by West Virginia residents and collectors. Donors including Herbert Fitzpatrick, Herman Dean, Ruth and Arthur Dayton, Wilbur Myers, and Winslow Anderson were among its largest donors, each presenting the museum with hundreds of gifts during their lifetimes. In addition to gifts, the museum has sought out additional works to enhance the collection through strategic purchases made possible through the establishment of endowments by the artists Sarah and Harold Wheeler, former docent Donald Harper and others.

=== American Art ===
The American Art collection comprises a variety of artworks ranging from paintings, prints, and sculpture to decorative arts and folk art. Much of the original holdings in this area were formed by Herbert Fitzpatrick and later enhanced through gifts from The Daywood Collection (below). The large folk art collection was primarily built through the efforts of former museum curator, Eason Eige, who searched the American south for outstanding examples to add to the museum's collection, including the self-portrait bust by the noted New York State sculptor, Asa Ames. Works by artists such as Childe Hassam, Robert Henri, John Singer Sargent, Andy Warhol, and Andrew Wyeth are included in the collection.

=== Asian Art ===
Created by the donation of Asian decorative objects by Herbert Fitzpatrick when the museum first opened, the collection of Asian Art has grown to include prints, paintings, sculpture, and textiles. Since the time of the original gift, the holdings in this area have been grown through gifts from the late West Virginia collectors William Warner Jones (Huntington) and Charles Burkart (Morgantown), whose 400-piece collection of modern and contemporary Japanese prints was left to the museum in 2019.

=== European Art ===
The European Art Collection comprises a variety of artworks ranging from paintings, prints, and drawings to sculpture and decorative arts. Much of the original holdings in this area were formed by Herbert Fitzpatrick and later enhanced through gifts made by local and regional collectors. The collection of British silver presented by Fitzpatrick is a highlight of the museum's holdings, and includes many pieces made for important members of the British aristocracy, including the Dukes of Ormonde. Works by artists such as Georges Braque, Jean-Baptiste-Camille Corot, Jean-François Millet, Pablo Picasso, and Pierre-Auguste Renoir are included in the collection.

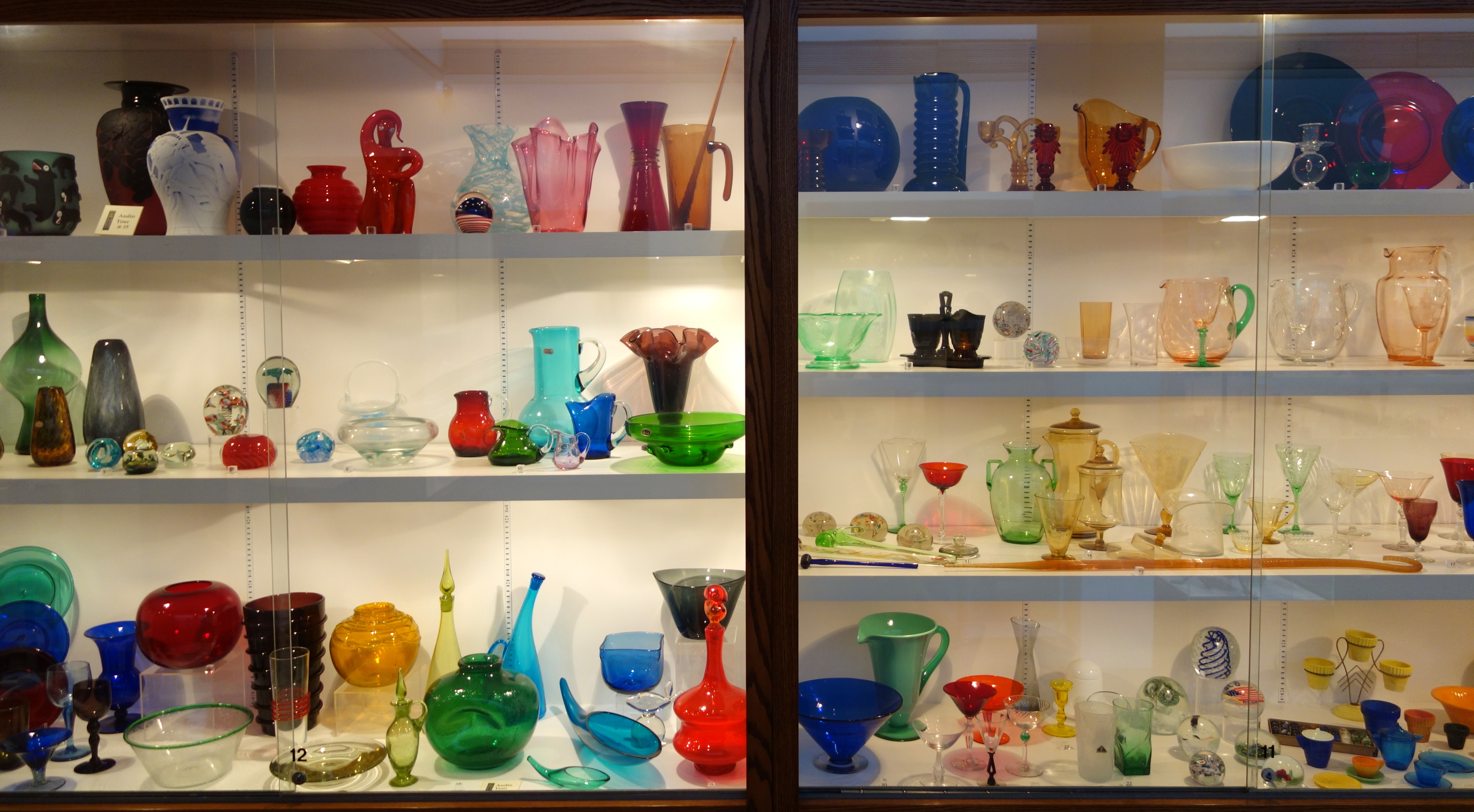
Glass and Decorative Arts Gallery – Huntington Museum of Art

=== Glass Collection ===
The museum's glass collection is its largest collection with more than 4,000 objects ranging in date from ancient to contemporary and exhibits the work and artistry of many glass companies, with a special focus on glass of the mid-Western/Ohio Valley. A selection of the collection is on permanent view in the Glass and Decorative Arts Gallery. A significant addition to the collection is a large Dale Chihuly tower that is located in the C. Fred Edwards Conservatory. The Wilbur Myers Glass Collection (below) also forms part of this collection.

=== Inuit Art and Sculpture ===
The small collection of Inuit art was assembled in the early 1950s by firearms collector Herman Dean during expeditions to the upper Hudson Bay region of Canada. Dean would personally meet with dealers that represented the artists during these trips and formed a holding that largely consists of figural sculptures. An important collection of documentary photographs of these trips is held in the Dean Papers at the Huntington Museum of Art.

=== The George L. Bagby Collection of British Portraits ===
Prominent Lexington, Kentucky composer and musician, George Littlejohn Bagby (1891–1961), donated an important group of paintings created by some of the leading portrait artists active in 18th century Great Britain. The noted British artists William Beechey, Henry Raeburn, Sir Joshua Reynolds, and George Romney were kept constantly busy with commissions from wealthy patrons across the British isles. Among the subjects featured in the collection of the museum are Miss Arabella Margaretta Phipps, Miss Catherine Angelo, Colonel Sir James Malcolm, and Col. William Congalton-Bethune.

=== The Daywood Collection ===
The Daywood Collection was given to the Huntington Museum of Art beginning in the late 1960s by Ruth Woods Dayton, which added almost 400 works of art to the museum's existing collection. The Daywood Collection has a strong emphasis on late 19th and early 20th century American art with a focus on American Impressionism, but also includes a number of important pieces by European artists. Mrs. Dayton wished for the collection to remain in West Virginia to benefit the people of the state, eventually choosing the Huntington Museum of Art as the best location for it to be appropriately housed and exhibited.

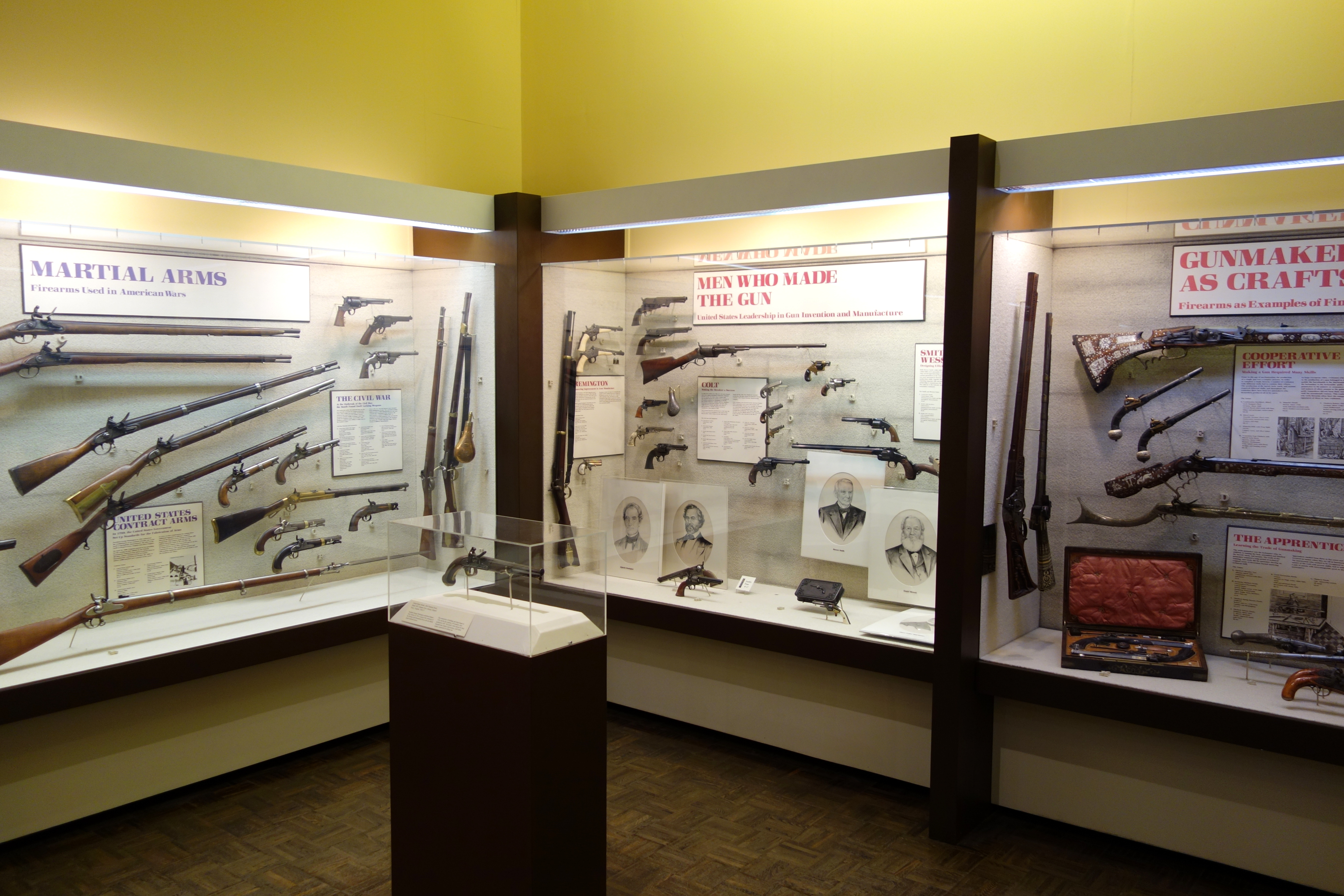
The Herman P. Dean Firearms Collection

=== The Herman P. Dean Firearms Collection ===
Herman Dean's collection of firearms includes a wide variety of historical objects from the earliest designed hand cannon up to weapons of the mid-19th century, with special focuses on the development of firing mechanisms and weapons of the American frontier, including the Kentucky Rifle. The collection of 212 firearms (not including the many associated accoutrements) is the third largest display on permanent exhibition in the United States.

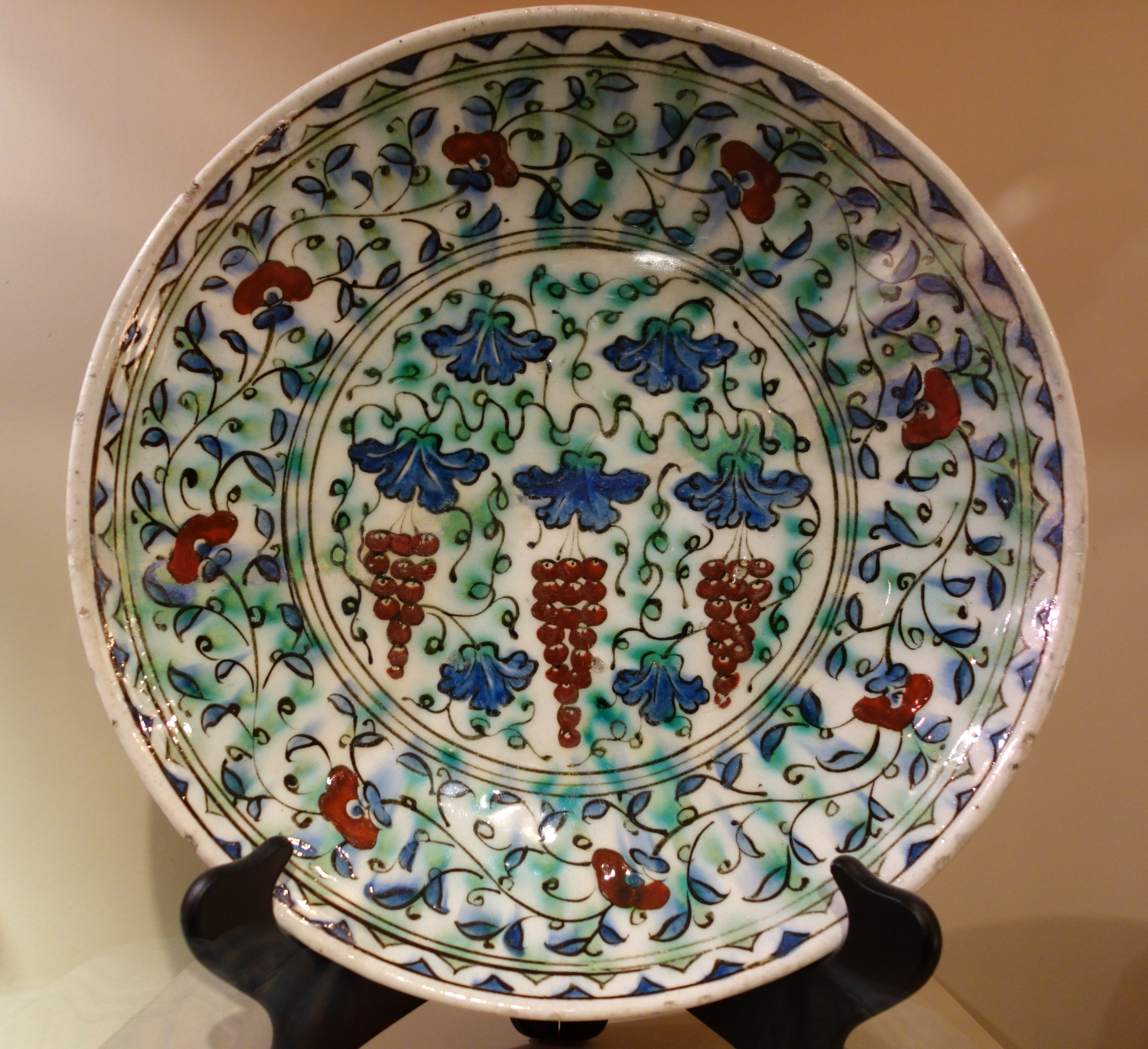
Dish with vines and grapes, Turkey, Iznik, 17th century, Touma Collection

=== The Touma Near Eastern Collection ===
Largely consisting of works donated to the museum by Drs. Omayma and Joseph B. Touma, the Touma Near Eastern Collection contains more than 400 works of art that include ceramics, glass, paintings, scientific instruments, and weaponry. The collection is housed in the Touma Near Eastern Gallery which was completed in 1996. In addition to the gifts made by the Touma family, the collection also includes an important holding of late 18th to late 19th century prayer rugs collected by Herbert Fitzpatrick, the Toumas, and others.

=== The Wilbur Myers Glass Collection ===
Local collector Wilbur Myers had a penchant for acquiring and collecting glass objects made primarily during the Victorian era (1837–1901). Among the hundreds of vases, ewers, bowls, cups and other decorative glass objects are pieces that feature elaborate enameling and other decoration. Two of the pieces on display are a pair of rare Morgan vases, which were featured on Antiques Roadshow in 2015.

=== The Winslow Anderson Collection of Haitian Art ===
Winslow Anderson (1917–2007) was an artist and glass designer from Plymouth, Massachusetts. A graduate of Alfred University's School of Ceramics, he became the leading glass designer for the Blenko Glass Company of West Virginia from 1946 through 1953. Anderson was a resident of Milton, West Virginia and beginning in 1948 he traveled regularly to the Republic of Haiti, where he searched out the works of local painters and metalsmiths. His collection of Haitian artworks first arrived on long-term loan in 1981 and was later gifted to the museum. It has been added to regularly through funding left to the museum by Anderson.

=== The James D. Francis Art and Reference Library ===
The James D. Francis Art and Reference Library contains nearly 29,000 books and catalogs on the history of world art. In addition to books and catalogs, the library holds a special collection of pamphlets and sales catalogs relating to the once extensive West Virginia glass industry. Of special interest are the library’s archival holdings, which include the papers of several important West Virginia based artists, including Winslow Anderson (glass), Kelsey Murphy (glass) and Stan Sporny (painting), as well as scrapbooks which document the early history of two of the largest art associations in the state, The Allied Artists of West Virginia (AAWV) and the Tri-State Arts Association (TSA). The final category of holdings are the extensive archival records relating to the history of the Museum, which include among other items the papers of Gwynn & Robert L. Daine (the latter an important inventor), Ruth Woods Dayton (noted American Art collector), Hermann P. Dean (noted firearms collector), as well as thousands of photographs. The library is open by appointment for approved researchers.

== Living collections ==
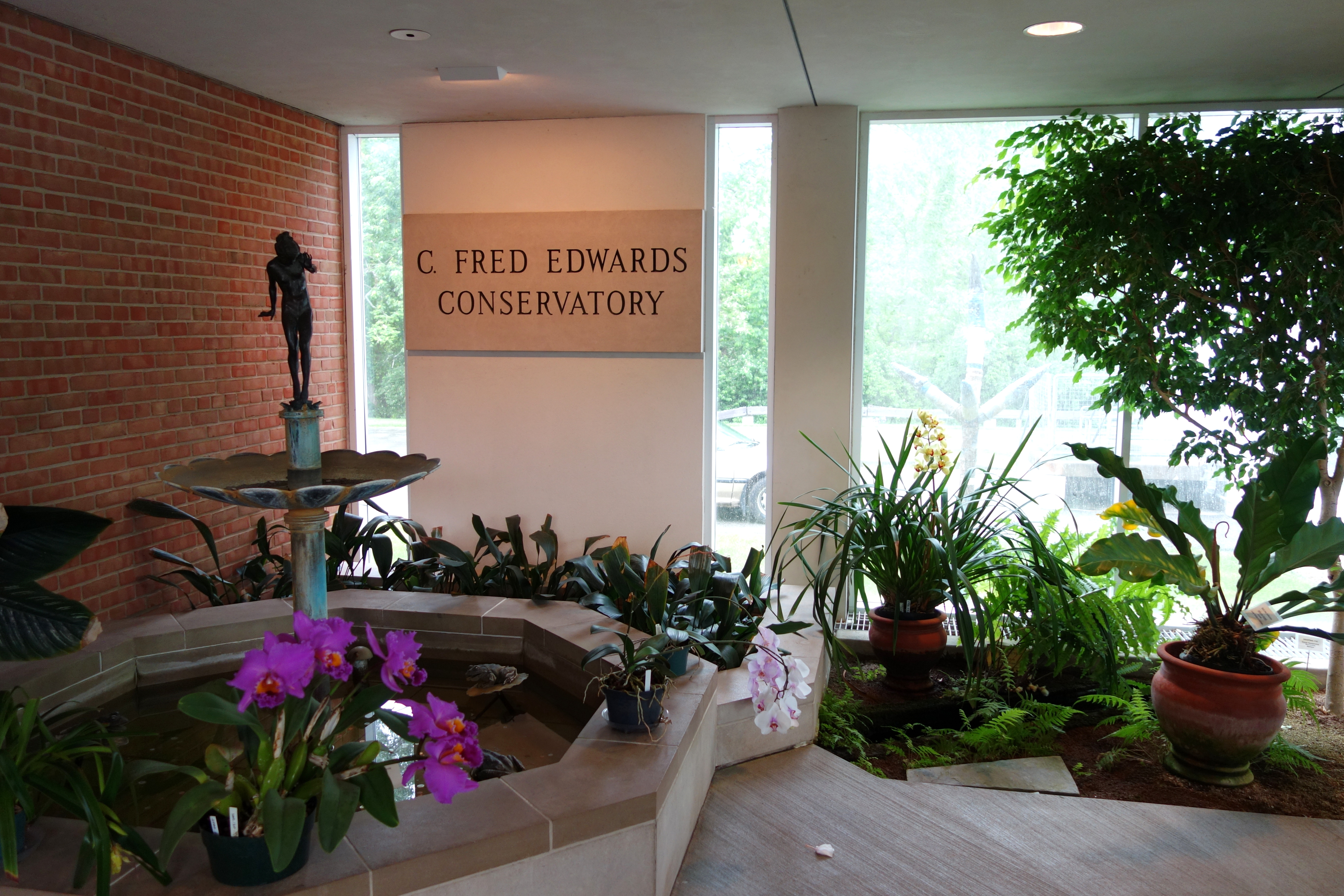
C. Fred Edwards Conservatory

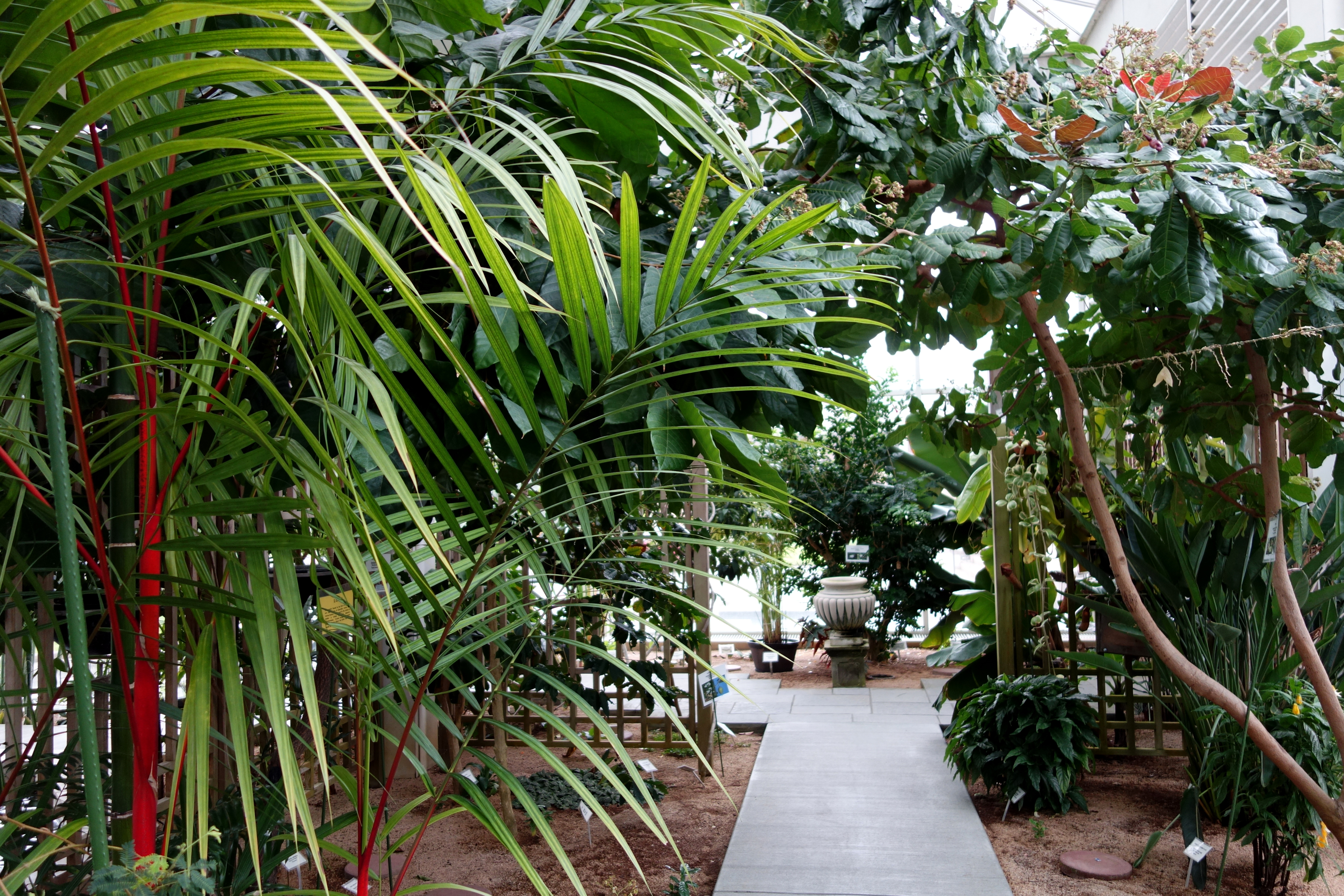
C. Fred Edwards Conservatory

=== C. Fred Edwards Conservatory ===
The C. Fred Edwards Conservatory was opened in 1996 and was the gift of local philanthropist, Joan C. Edwards. It is the only tropical and subtropical plant conservatory in West Virginia and the tri-state region. In addition to plants, the conservatory features many animals, including koi (colored varieties of the Amur carp), poison dart frogs, axolotls and a saltwater aquarium featuring various types of corals and other aquatic animals. The plants featured in the conservatory fall under four primary categories: Orchids, Agriculturally Important, Fragrant, and Unusual.

- Orchids – The orchid collection includes dozens of varieties from around the world.
- Agriculturally Important – The plants classified as agriculturally important are ones that are eaten or used in some way. Examples are banana, cashew, chocolate, coffee, pineapple, pomegranate, sugar cane, and vanilla.
- Fragrant – Fragrant plants are those that give off characteristically strong aromas, such as the cadaver plant.
- Unusual – The collection of unusual plants refers to plants that are not commonly known to us in our daily lives such as the pitcher plant, the turtle plant, and the sensitive plant.

=== Nature Trail System ===
The original trail system at the museum dates back to the 1950s. By the 1970s it had become part of the national trails system. Since that time, the trails have grown to over a mile, with six separate runs that include varying types of terrain. They include the Teubert Sensory Trail (which is handicapped accessible), the Gentle Oak trail, the Spicebush trail, the Tulip Tree trail, the Connector trail, and the Ghost trail. The Steelman Butterfly Garden is located at the beginning of the trail system.

== Gallery of images ==
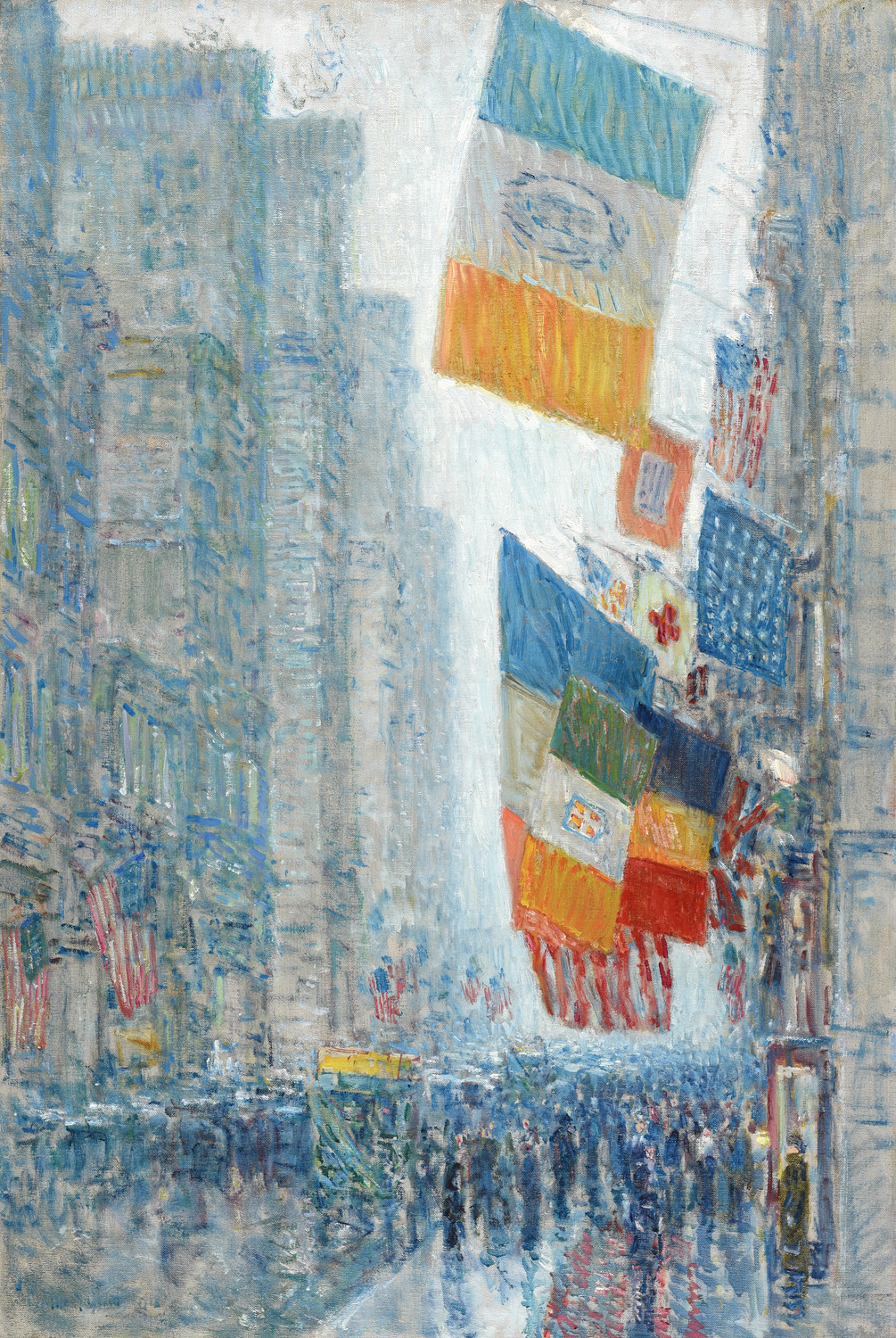
Childe Hassam, Lincoln's Birthday Flags - 1918, 1918

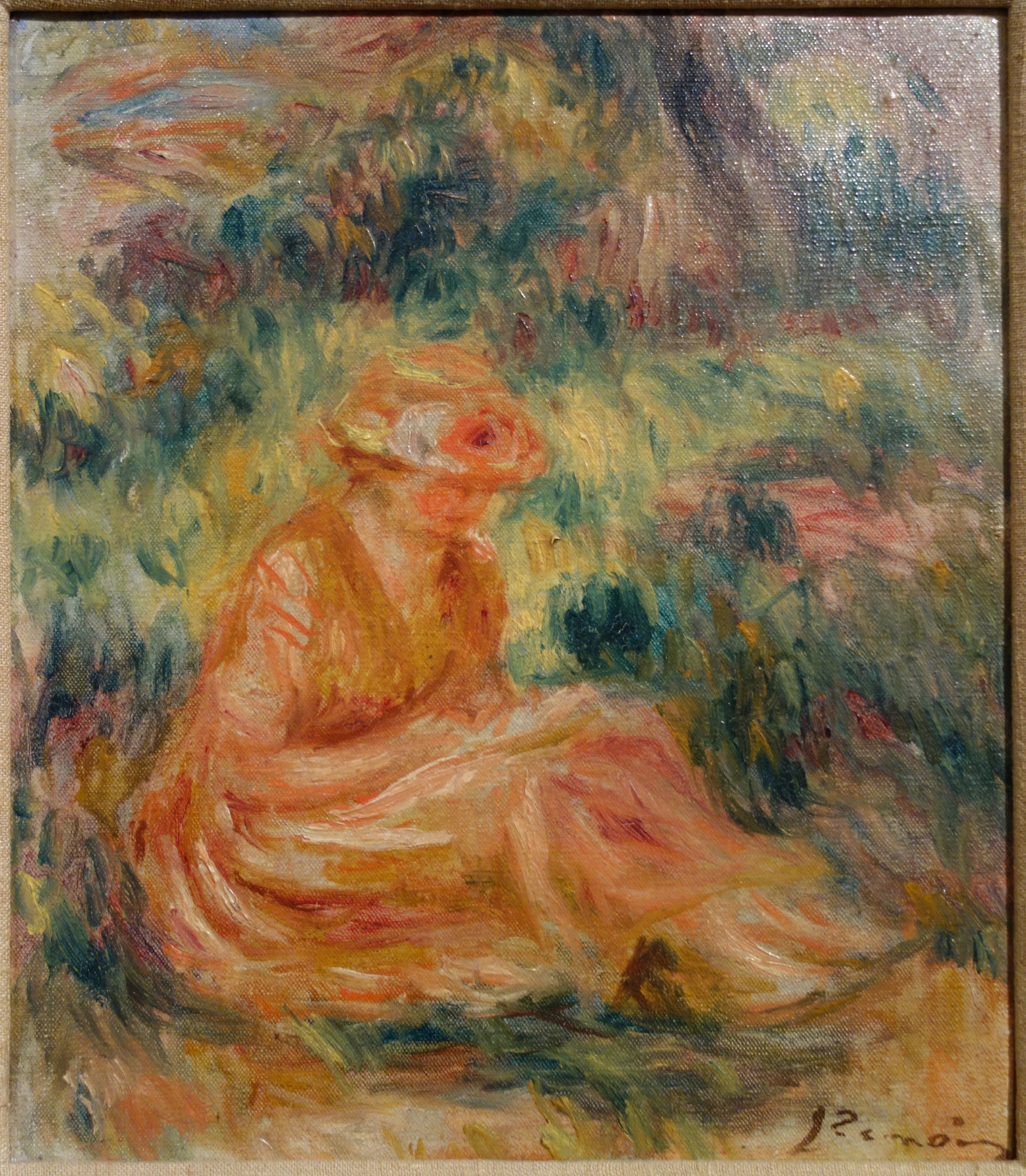
Pierre-Auguste Renoir, Young Woman in a Landscape, c. 1915-1919

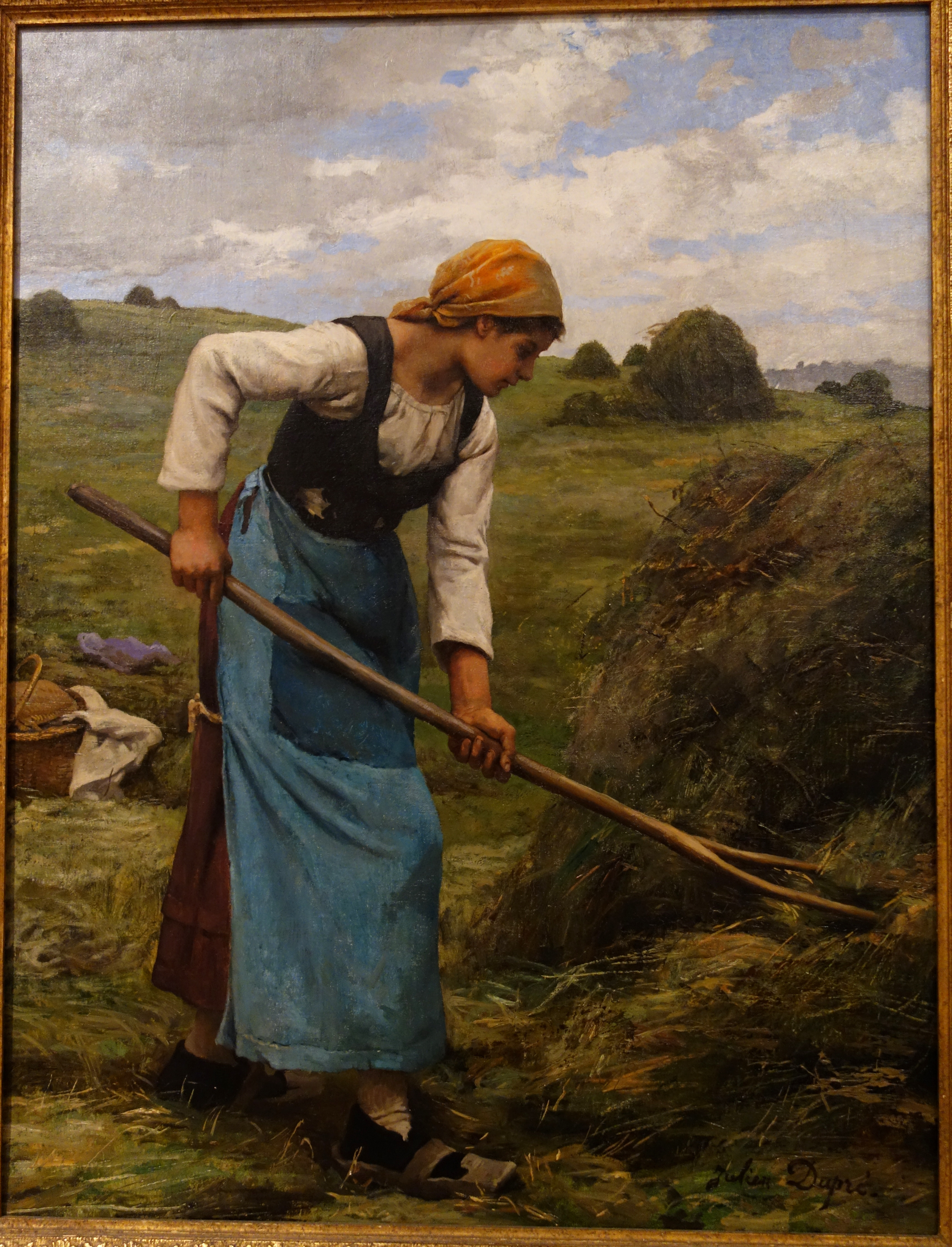
Julien Dupre, The Harvester, c. 1880-1881

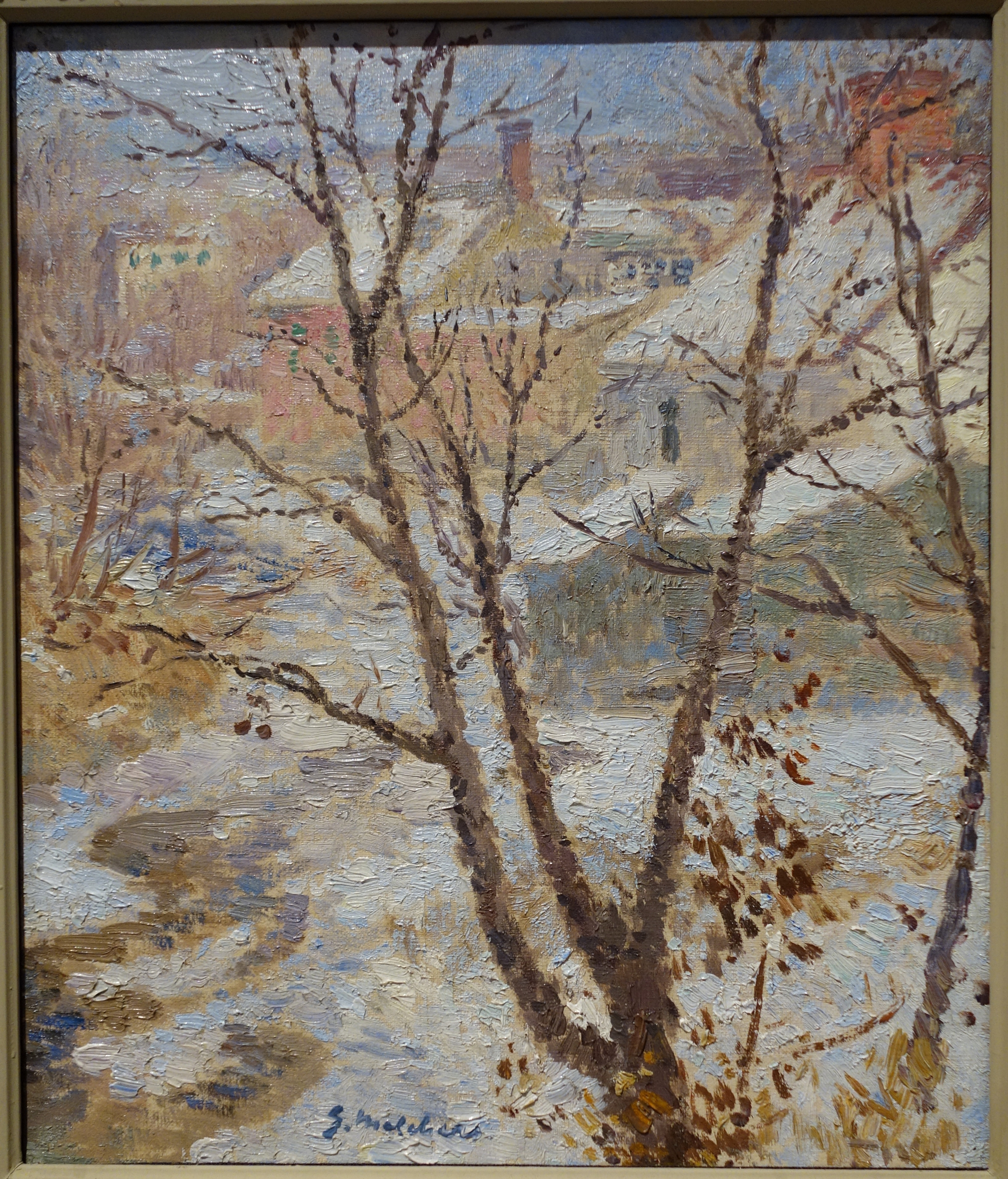
Gari Melchers, Snow Scene, after 1916

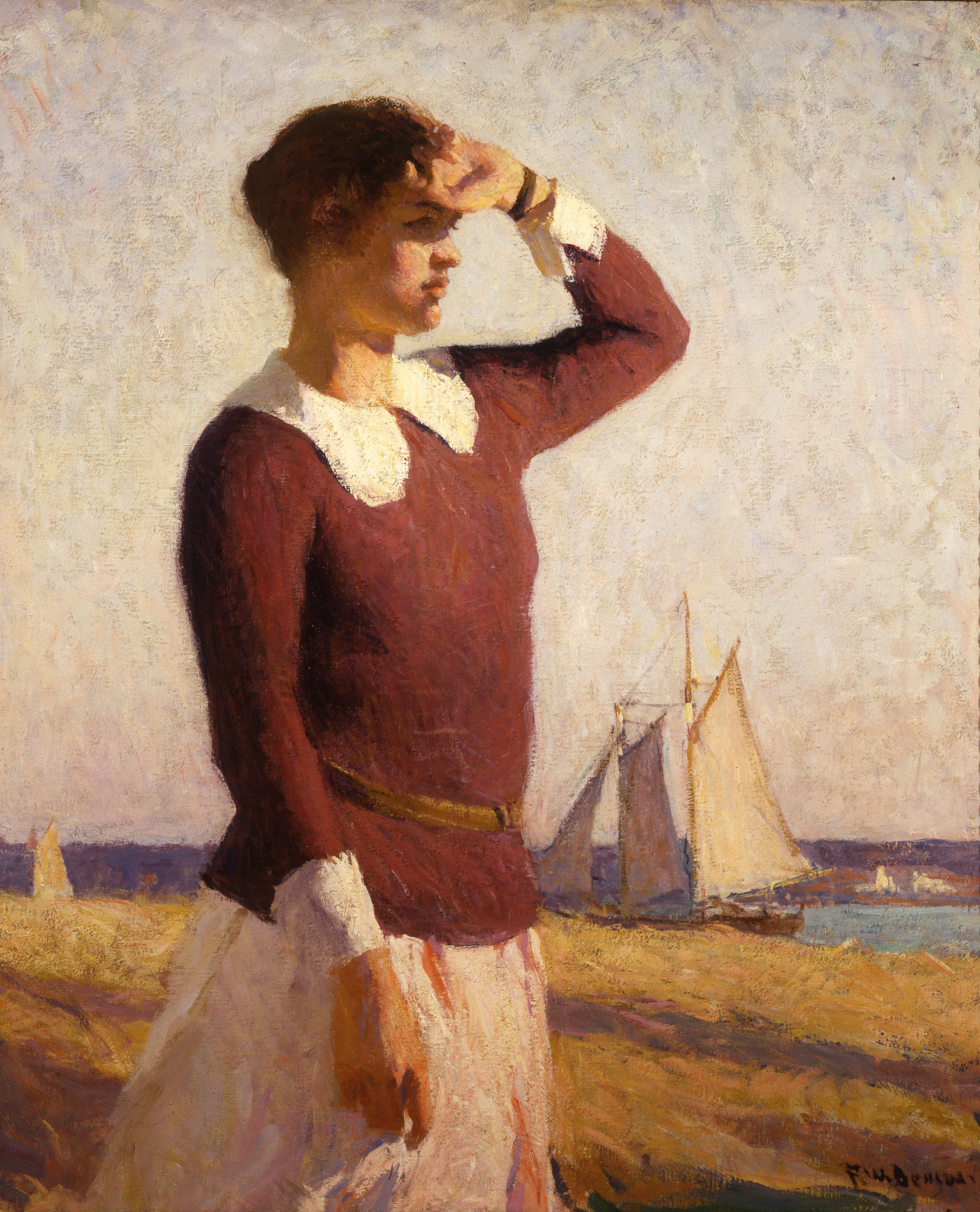
Frank Benson, The Watcher, 1921

== See also ==
- List of museums in Huntington, West Virginia
