= Campbell House (Huntington, West Virginia) =

Historic house in Huntington, West Virginia, United States

- U.S. National Register of Historic Places
- The Campbell House in 2015.

- Location within West Virginia Location within the United States
- Location: 1030 13th Avenue, Huntington, West Virginia 25701
- Coordinates: 38°24′32.8284″N 82°26′15.4068″W
- Architectural style: Neoclassical
- NRHP reference No.: 90001774
- Added to NRHP: 1990

The Campbell House, is a historic home located between the Cammack House and the Campbell-Staats House in the Ritter Park Historic District in Huntington, West Virginia.

Facing Ritter Park, the Campbell House was built in 1923. It is a three-story, Neoclassical dwelling, including a large portico supported by four columns.

It was listed on the National Register of Historic Places in 1990.

== See also ==
- National Register of Historic Places listings in Cabell County, West Virginia
