= Carlos Mirabal =

American baseball player (born 1973)

Staten Island FerryHawks
- Manager / Pitcher
- Born: April 24, 1973 (age 53); Englewood, New Jersey, U.S.
- Batted: Right Threw: Right

Professional debut
- CPBL: March 18, 1999, for the Koos Group Whales
- NPB: April 1, 2000, for the Nippon-Ham Fighters

Last appearance
- CPBL: October 21, 1999, for the Koos Group Whales
- NPB: April 8, 2005, for the Hokkaido Nippon-Ham Fighters

CPBL statistics
- Win–loss record: 2–1
- Earned run average: 1.87
- Strikeouts: 62

NPB statistics
- Win–loss record: 39–38
- Earned run average: 4.32
- Strikeouts: 353
- Stats at Baseball Reference

Teams
- Koos Group Whales (1999); Nippon-Ham Fighters/Hokkaido Nippon-Ham Fighters (2000–2005)

Carlos Mirabal (born April 24, 1973) is an American professional baseball coach and former pitcher who played professionally from 1996 to 2023. He played in the Chinese Professional Baseball League (CPBL) for the Koos Group Whales and in Nippon Professional Baseball (NPB) for the Nippon-Ham Fighters / Hokkaido Nippon-Ham Fighters.

== Playing career ==
Mirabal played baseball for Bergen County Technical Schools and then spent one semester at Fairleigh Dickinson University before leaving New Jersey to play professional baseball in Puerto Rico. In 1995, he was a replacement player for the New York Yankees during the 1994–95 Major League Baseball strike but injured his elbow in spring training and required surgery.

He played for the Altoona Rail Kings of the North Atlantic League in 1996. After pitching in Taiwan in 1998 and 1999, he pitched from 2000 to 2005 for the Nippon-Ham Fighters in Japan's Nippon Professional Baseball. He was twice the opening day starting pitcher for the Fighters. He was offered a contract by the Colorado Rockies in 2005 but was unable to get a release from his contract with the Fighters. According to Mirabal, he had been virtually guaranteed a spot on Colorado's opening day roster.

He signed with the Houston Astros in 2007 but was released after spring training. From 2006 to 2008, he played with the Atlantic League's Newark Bears winning the league Championship in 2007.

Mirabal came out of retirement in 2015 to pitch for the Trois-Rivières Aigles of the Can–Am League in 2016. He later served as the pitching coach of the Rockland Boulders and the Aigles. Mirabal also served in a "key operational role" with Baseball United.

== Coaching career ==
On March 5, 2026, Mirabal was hired as the manager of the Staten Island FerryHawks of the Atlantic League of Professional Baseball.
