= Camp Mad Anthony Wayne =

- U.S. National Register of Historic Places
- Location within West Virginia Location within the United States
- Location: 2125 Spring Valley Dr., Huntington, West Virginia
- Coordinates: 38°22′4″N 82°30′47″W
- Area: 4.5 acres (1.8 ha)
- Architect: Meanor & Handloser; Jerry DeYoung
- Architectural style: Rustic
- NRHP reference No.: 02001531
- Added to NRHP: December 12, 2002

Camp Mad Anthony Wayne is located on Spring Valley Drive near Huntington, West Virginia, United States. Named for frontier army general Anthony Wayne, it contains vast open grounds, swings and sliding boards, hiking trails, numerous picnic tables, an open campfire circle, and a lodge. The facility sleeps 28 and contains a bathroom and shower facilities. It is host to two large wood-fired fireplaces.

In 2002, part of Camp Wayne was listed on the National Register of Historic Places, qualifying because of its historically significant architecture. The designated area included a group of buildings dating between 1931 and 1944, including the lodge and seven houses.

== See also ==
- Greater Huntington Parks and Recreation District
