= Winslow Anderson =

American painter

- Anderson c. 1950
- Born: Winslow George Anderson; May 17, 1917; Plymouth, Massachusetts
- Died: December 10, 2007 (aged 90); Milton, West Virginia
- Education: Alfred University, Pennsylvania Academy of Fine Arts
- Known for: Painting, ceramics, glass design

Winslow George Anderson (May 17, 1917 – December 10, 2007) was an American artist, painter, ceramicist and glass designer from Plymouth, Massachusetts. A graduate of Alfred University's School of Ceramics, Anderson was a leading glass designer for the Blenko Glass Company of West Virginia (1946-1953) and design director for Lenox China and Crystal, located in Trenton, New Jersey (1953-1979). He was the recipient of numerous accolades during his lifetime, including Museum of Modern Art Good Design Awards. His works have been exhibited and collected by museums across the United States, including the Baltimore Museum of Art, Cooper Hewitt, Smithsonian Design Museum, Metropolitan Museum of Art, Museum of Modern Art, and the Solomon R. Guggenheim Museum.

== Early years ==
Anderson was born in Plymouth, Massachusetts, the son of Marguerite Paula Rogers (1893 - 1972) and George J. Anderson, who divorced sometime during the 1930s with Anderson remaining with his mother. He grew up sailing the waters near Plymouth and on Long Island Sound, and his love of boats and sailing were an important early influence on his design aesthetic. He stated that as a teenager he would spend hours drawing boats and building models and that he was fascinated by the rhythmic qualities of their soft, curved lines. Anderson was also particularly fascinated by antiques displayed during his youth in the shops of his hometown, where he noticed the,

Hand-dipped candles, hand-loomed woven items, pewter, pottery, hand-crafted furniture, and many other crafted products [that] all influenced my sense of form... The products all reflected a proper use of the materials from which they were made. I was never taught the 'rightness' of the proper use of these materials - I simply 'absorbed it.'

== Education ==
As a young man, he began his studies at the nearby Plymouth Pottery (where he worked c. 1937–40) after years of odd jobs, where it quickly became clear to his employers that he had a talent for hand craftsmanship. A group of alumni from Alfred University who saw his pottery on a visit to Plymouth strongly encouraged him to apply to the university's School of Ceramics. The original intention of the school was to create industrial designers for America, and particularly for New York State. At Alfred University Anderson thrived in the atmosphere created by the faculty. In February 1941 he joined his professor, Charles Harder (1899 - 1959), and a select group of other students on a trip to visit (and learn from) southern potteries located in Erwin, Tennessee. While at Alfred he also studied with the respected Japanese potter, Shōji Hamada (1894 – 1978), who was known for sourcing all of his materials locally. Only a short time into his studies, World War II broke out, and Anderson found himself in the Army.

During his four-year service in the United States military he served as a topographical draftsman and lived in Manhattan and on Long Island. It was during this period that he designed and built an African style mask composed entirely of scrap parts, including hooks, springs and pieces of brass. The mask was entered into the Metropolitan Museum of Art's 1945/46 exhibition and design competition for Army personnel in the "Inventive Use of Improvised Materials" section, where it was awarded 2nd prize. Upon his return to Alfred University after the conclusion of the war in 1946 a school-wide competition was held inviting students to design a goblet. The winner of the competition would have their drawing crafted into an actual goblet by the glassblowers of the famous Steuben Glass Works. Anderson's creation was selected as the winning design, and the actual glass goblet created by Steuben is today housed in the collection of the Huntington Museum of Art, located in Huntington, West Virginia. He went on to graduate from Alfred University with departmental honors (magna cum laude) in Industrial Ceramic Design in June 1947.

=== Other studies ===
During two summers (c. 1945–46) spent in Provincetown, Massachusetts Anderson studied with the noted modernist painter, Hans Hofmann (1880 - 1966). In addition, during his residency in New Jersey Anderson took evening classes at the Pennsylvania Academy of Fine Arts in Philadelphia, studying with the painters Morris Blackburn (1902 - 1979) and Oliver Grimley (b. 1920).

== Blenko Glass ==
Anderson's work at Blenko Glass, located in Milton, West Virginia, began as jobs do - with a search for the right candidate,

In 1946 William Blenko, Sr. decided it was time to hire a resident designer. He contacted Alfred University's College of Ceramics in Alfred, NY to see if they had any promising prospects. The school recommended Winslow Anderson.

Shortly after his graduation Anderson began his position at Blenko Glass where he was quickly appointed as their first full-time in house designer, a position he occupied from 1947 - 1953. While at Blenko he introduced over 160 new and different designs, entirely reshaping the company's product line and its future production focus. The majority of his designs were influenced by smooth, simplified and streamlined shapes and forms that were influenced by modern, Swedish design aesthetics and by his growing interest in the chemistry and nature of glass. Anderson himself credited his success with glass to his training in pottery,

There is a very great similarity in handling clay and glass. There is a sharp cutoff in the idea that in glass you are working with a hot molten material and in clay you are working with a cold piece of clay. But the manipulation of a hand-thrown pot can be compared to blowing a mouth-shaped piece of glass. The opening of the glass is identical to the way clay handles. I only had to watch them make glass for a day or two. It came very naturally.

Developing new designs at Blenko during Anderson's tenure was a multi-step process, which begin first with a cross section drawing or the creation of a pottery form. Following this, a wooden form would be made and Anderson would work closely with glass blowers and finishers deciding if the shape and size were correct, or if they needed improvement. Then another drawing was made that reflected any changes that were made, followed by the creation of a new mold. This process would be repeated until the shape and texture achieved a level of acceptable refinement. His success at Blenko led to an invitation in 1948 to speak at the National Ceramic Convention.

While at Blenko, Anderson also oversaw promotional activities that would coincide with his new line. This included the design in 1949 of a new, brightly colored and modern looking billboard that featured his new glass forms and shapes and which invited viewers to come to see them in person at Blenko's showroom. Later that year he traveled back to Alfred for the annual Arts Festival.

In 1950 Anderson returned again to Alfred University to study with the noted British Potter, Bernard Leach (1887 - 1979), whose simple and utilitarian style greatly influenced modern design in North America during the 1950s and 1960s. The three-week, in-depth course almost certainly had a profound effect on the work being carried out by Anderson at Blenko.

== Lenox China and Crystal ==
After seven years at Blenko, Anderson decided to make a move to a more prestigious position at Lenox China and Crystal, located in Trenton, New Jersey, where he became design director of the firm in 1953. That July John Tassie of Lenox hired Anderson to succeed Frank Graham Holmes, who had served as chief designer since 1905. One of his first tasks was to create a modern line of glass (Lenox had acquired the Bryce Glassware Company of Mt. Pleasant, PA soon after his arrival) as well as develop new product lines for the china division of the company. In order to determine what Lenox's clientele was looking for he spent time in department stores observing shoppers. He quickly determined that most were looking for designs that reflected a more conservative, classical style, which led him to introduce china with elements that related to the natural world, incorporating aspects of different varieties of flowers and vegetables, including cabbage and ginkgo leaves, as well as wares decorated with more subtle decorations and gilt finishes.

During his quarter century in New Jersey Anderson found time to share his talents with others, including teaching ceramics in the early 1950s at the short lived, Princeton Group Arts. Founded in 1946, Princeton Group Arts was originally organized by Princeton University professors and members of nearby Jewish and Quaker communities to form a cultural organization that was integrated both on a racial and religious level, something that was novel in the region during the period.

== Personal life ==
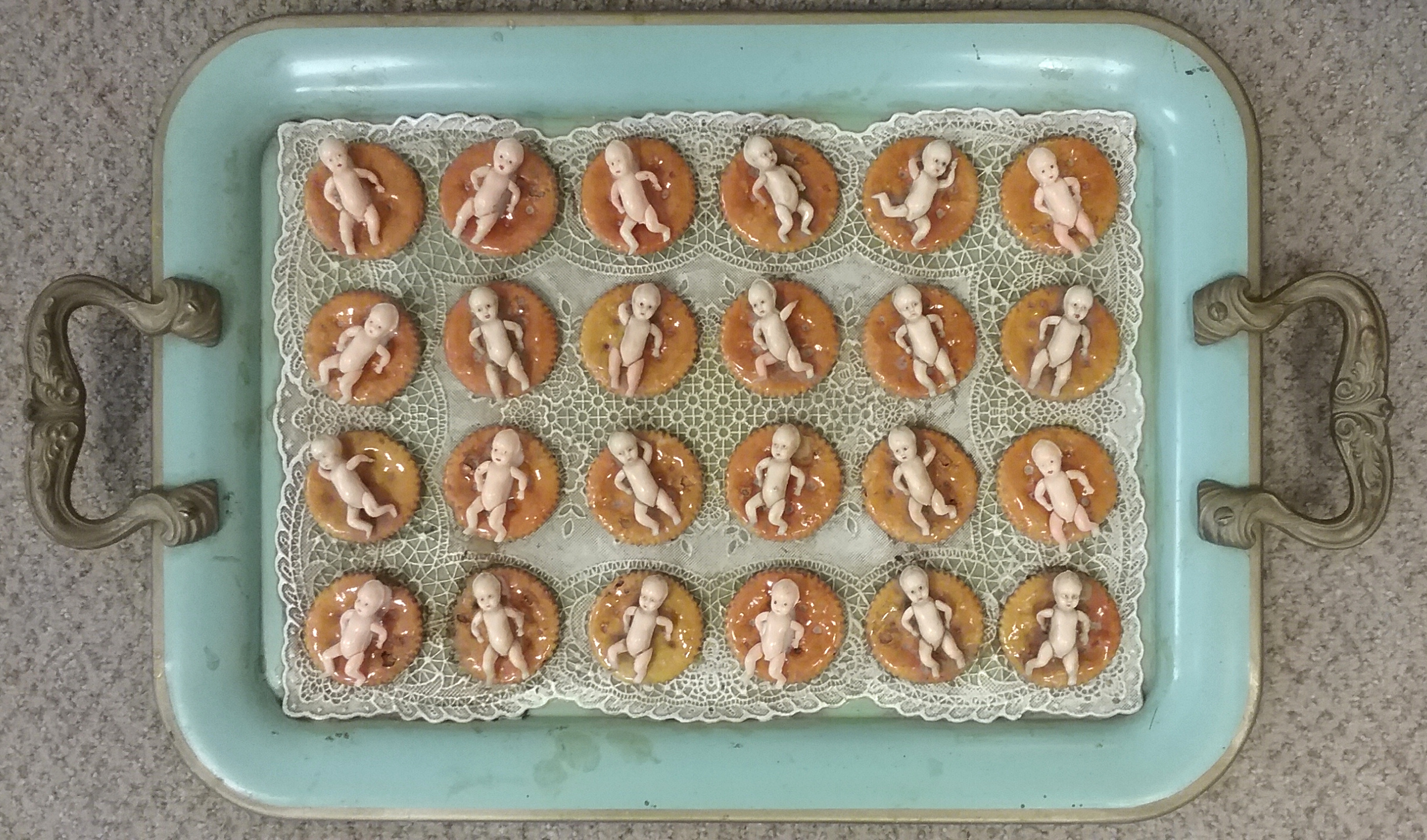
"The Gay Tray," 1970, Private Collection, Huntington WV.

As a gay man, Anderson had an interest in the changing nature of American civil rights during his career. Ever aware of the persecution individuals like himself could suffer, he carefully planned excursions and vacations to places that would be welcoming to those of his persuasion. He researched travel locations extensively, particularly in Europe and the Caribbean, noting whether they had "gay friendly" bars, clubs, or beaches located nearby. During the late 1960s/early 1970s when civil rights ordinances were under threat across the United States, Anderson became particularly annoyed by the actions of the conservative activist, Anita Bryant. As an artistic statement done partially in response to Bryant's anti-gay efforts, he created a sculptural protest piece entitled "The Gay Tray" (1970). Designed after an anti-gay quote he saw in a men's toilet which read "Cock Suckers Eat Babies," the work features a tray of babies served up as hors d'oeuvres on lacquered Ritz crackers.

In 1979 Anderson retired from Lenox and moved back to West Virginia where he settled in a small cottage in Milton not far from the Blenko factory. In retirement he indulged his passion for collecting, filling his small home with anything and everything that fascinated him, from pottery and glass, to paintings and souvenirs from his travels. Winslow Anderson died at the age of ninety on December 10, 2007, and was buried in the Milton Cemetery near his mother. Much of his collection and estate was willed to the Huntington Museum of Art, where an endowment was established in his name which helps to fund the conservation and acquisition of artwork for the museum's permanent collection.

== Exhibitions ==
Winslow Anderson participated in numerous exhibitions during his long career. While at Alfred University he participated in student exhibitions and competitions. His works were included in exhibitions at the Metropolitan Museum of Art in New York as early as 1945. In 1946 and 1947 his ceramic pieces were included in the Eleventh and Twelfth Annual National Ceramics Exhibitions held at the Syracuse Museum of Fine Arts (Everson Museum of Art). In 1949 Anderson, along with other colleagues who had studied at Alfred University, were included in the major 'For Modern Living' exhibition which was held at the Detroit Institute of Arts. The exhibition included more than 2,000 designs for home furnishings from modern designers from throughout the world, five of which were either graduates of or instructors at Alfred University. During the 1940s his paintings were included in exhibitions at New York's Museum of Non-Objective Painting, which later became the Solomon R. Guggenheim Museum of Art. Beginning in the early 1950s, his glass works were exhibited at New York's Museum of Modern Art, where they received multiple Good Design Awards between 1951 and 1953.

Other exhibitions in which he participated during this period include the "Living Up-To-Date" exhibition held at the Baltimore Museum of Art and the "For Your Home" exhibition held at the University of Illinois at Urbana, both held in 1951, and at the Fourth Annual International Exhibition of Ceramic Arts, held in Washington, D.C., in 1953, where Anderson received the "Leo Popper and Sons Award." He was featured on American television as early as 1959 and his works were discussed and/or illustrated in national magazines, including House & Garden and House Beautiful.

His glass designs continue to be extremely popular due to the massive interest in modern design and are exhibited regularly across the country, including at the 2007 exhibition "Blenko: West Virginia's Gift to the World," held at the West Virginia State Museum in 2007. One of the most recent exhibitions in which his glass creations were shown was the 2012 exhibition "20th Century American Art Glass, Blenko: The First Four Designers, 1947-74," held at Culture • Object at the Cassina SoHo Showroom, located in New York City.

== Early keyboard instruments ==
Anderson had a strong interest in early keyboard instruments, including the organ and the predecessors to the modern piano. He spoke at AGO (American Guild of Organists) meetings and was the proud owner of a virginal designed and built by Arnold Dolmetsch (1858-1940), one of the leading figures in the revival of early music during the 20th century. Anderson's virginal was built at the Chickering factory in 1906 (serial number 13) and was based on a circa 1612 instrument by the Ruckers Family of Antwerp. It was played by a number of individuals during his ownership, including the noted New York based organist and harpsichordist, Harold Chaney (1930-2014). Anderson owned this instrument until 1981, when he sold it to Siri von Reis Gaull of Fifth Avenue, New York City, wife of the noted scientist and educator, Gerald E. Gaull (1931-1997).

== Collection of Haitian art ==
One of the Anderson's lasting contributions to our shared cultural heritage is the extensive collection of Haitian paintings and sculptures he assembled over a forty-year period. He was first introduced to the work of Haitian artist while visiting a friend who had a coffee table book on the subject written by the author, Selden Rodman. Anderson stated that upon seeing the book he was "electrified by the illustrations" and his friend, who worked in the Bureau of Cultural Relations for the Caribbean and South America, wrote a letter of introduction for him to DeWitt Peters, the founder of Le Centre d'Art in Port-au-Prince. Peters and Anderson became quick friends, and he advised Anderson on his purchases until his death in 1966.

Beginning in 1948 and continuing through 1989, Anderson traveled regularly to the Republic of Haiti, where he sought out the work of local painters who had only begun to be recognized for their work. Over the next five decades he purchased nearly 160 artworks, including paintings, metal cut-outs, and wooden sculptures by artists working in Haiti he could afford, including Gabriel Alix, Montas Antoine, Rigaud Benoit, Préfète Duffaut, Hector Hyppolite, Jasmin Joseph, Stephane Magloire, Sénèque Obin, and Salnave Philippe-Auguste. According to Jenine Culligan, former Senior Curator at the Huntington Museum of Art, Anderson

made annual trips to Haiti – often visiting every six months. Each day he spent in Port-au-Prince, he visited Le Centre d'Art, and with the eye of a trained artist/designer, he carefully perused the stacks of paintings available for purchase, pulled his favorites, and in a separate room, began his own stack of works he wished to acquire. DeWitt Peters determined the price of each painting the day before Anderson departed Haiti. The two would meet, go through Anderson's “stack,” and figure prices. Anderson would reluctantly pare his selection down to those he could afford – and one can imagine the friendly dickering that must have occurred. In his forty years of visiting Haiti, Anderson met many of the pioneers of Haitian painting, and purchased representations of their early styles. A number of works [were] gifts from artists to Mr. Anderson, including a copper cut-out sculpture by Georges Liautaud, an artist whose work Anderson could never afford to purchase.

Parts of this important collection have been included in major museum exhibitions, including four paintings by Rigaud Benoit, and one by Salnave Philippe-August that were part of one of the first major exhibitions titled 'Haitian Art,' organized by The Brooklyn Museum in 1978, which traveled to the Milwaukee Art Center, and the New Orleans Museum of Art. Selections from the collection have been displayed at The Regional Arts Center, Centre College, Danville, Kentucky (April 5 - May 3, 1981); Southern Ohio Museum and Cultural Center, Portsmouth, Ohio (May 24 - August 1, 1981); and The Headley-Whitney Museum, Lexington, Kentucky (April 4 - June 10, 1982). The collection has been shown regularly at the Huntington Museum of Art where it was first placed on long-term loan in 1981.

== Museum collections ==
Public institutions that hold works created or designed by Winslow Anderson include the following:

- Alfred University, Alfred, NY
- Blenko Glass Museum, Milton, WV
- Cooper Hewitt, Smithsonian Design Museum, New York, NY
- Corning Museum of Glass, Corning, NY
- Dallas Museum of Art, Dallas, TX
- Huntington Museum of Art, Huntington, WV
- Museum of Modern Art, New York, NY
- The Museum of American Glass, Weston, WV
- Toledo Museum of Art, Toledo, OH
- West Virginia State Museum, Charleston, WV
