= St. Cloud Commons =

Public Park in West Virginia, United States

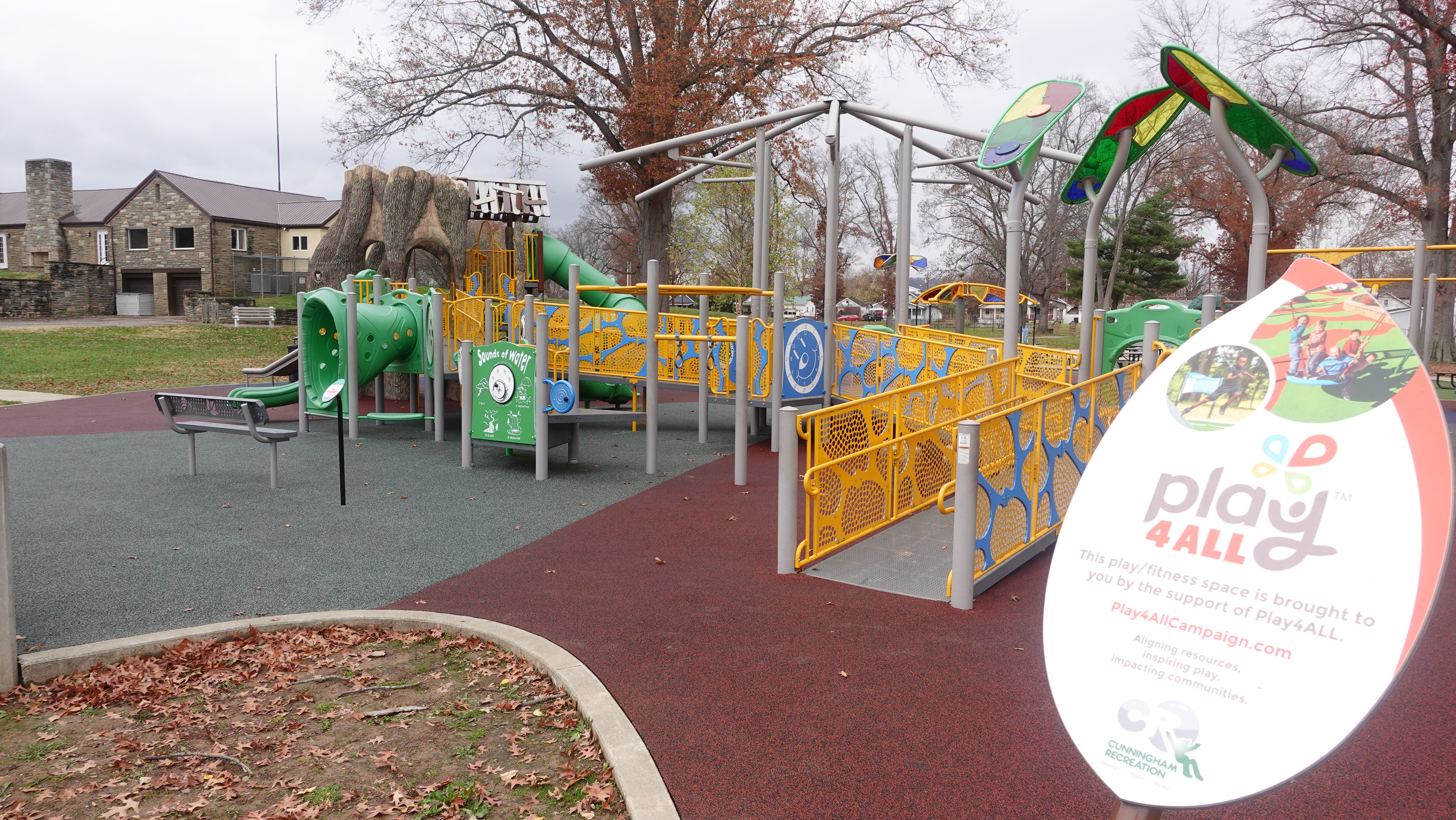
- St. Cloud Commons Playground in 2023.
- Interactive map of St. Cloud Commons
- Type: Public park
- Location: 1701 Jackson Ave, Huntington, West Virginia 25704
- Coordinates: 38°24′21.456″N 82°28′56.64″W
- Authorized: Greater Huntington Park and Recreation District

St. Cloud Commons is a public park, managed by the Greater Huntington Park and Recreation District in Huntington, West Virginia.

== History ==
St. Cloud Commons was originally established in 1910, with the opening of St. Cloud Commons Baseball Field. Years later in the 1930s, the St. Cloud Commons extended with the addition of a Lodge, that served a community center for West Huntington.

=== Minor League Baseball ===
In 1990, the Huntington Cubs, an affiliate of the Chicago Cubs, were the first tenants at the baseball field. The team dissolved after four seasons of the Appalachian League in 1994. Four years later in 1998 the Huntington Rail Kings had a year stint at the baseball field while not finishing the 1997-1998 Heartland League season.

=== 21st Century Renovations ===
In 2018, St. Cloud Commons opened its all-inclusive playground. Recognized as an Inclusion National Demonstration Site, the playground features a nature design with sensory play opportunities and various interactive play activities at elevated and ground levels. Three years later in 2021, the St. Cloud Commons playground opened their splash park.

== See also ==
- Recreation in Huntington, West Virginia
