= Memorial Arch (Huntington, West Virginia) =

- U.S. National Register of Historic Places
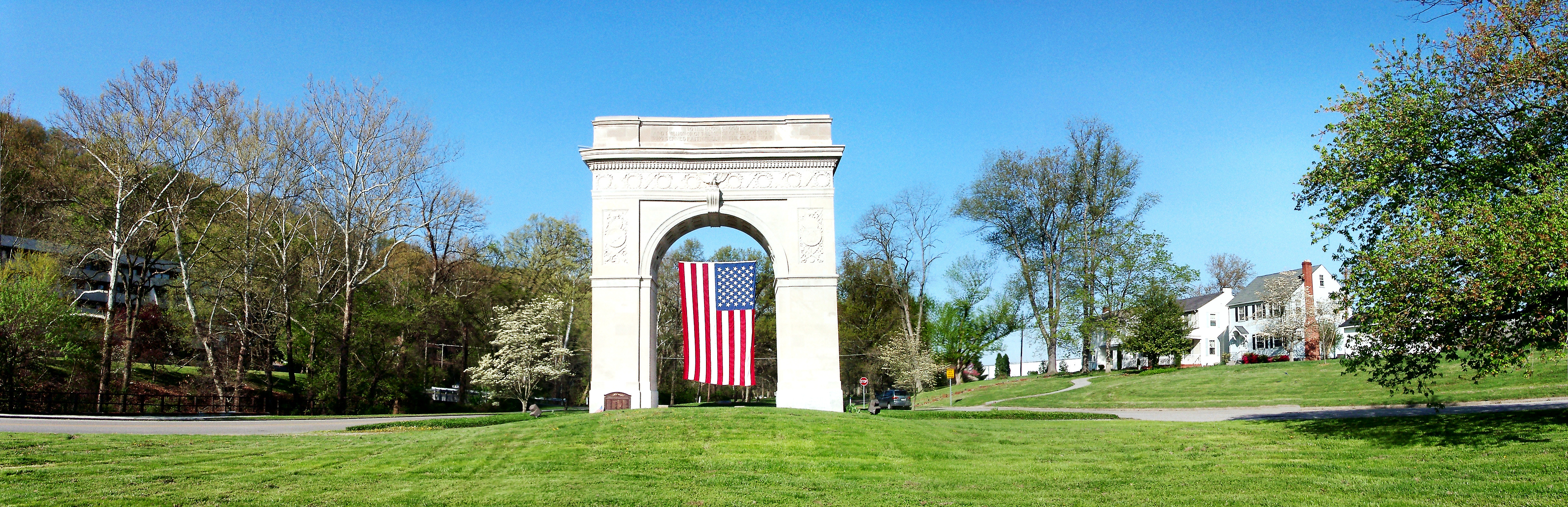
- Memorial Arch, October 2012
- Location: Memorial Park, Huntington, West Virginia
- Coordinates: 38°24′23″N 82°27′46″W
- Area: 0.5 acres (0.20 ha)
- Built: 1924
- Architect: Meanor & Handloser et al.
- Architectural style: Classical Revival
- NRHP reference No.: 81000597
- Added to NRHP: April 16, 1981

The Memorial Arch is a historic memorial arch located in Memorial Park at Huntington, Cabell County, West Virginia. It was built between 1924 and 1929 by the Cabell County War Memorial Association as a memorial to the dead and to those who served the county in World War I. It is built of gray Indiana limestone on a gray granite base. It measures 42 feet high, 34 feet wide, and 9 feet deep. It features Classical Revival style bas-relief carvings. The structure was rededicated in 1980. It is the only triumphal style arch in West Virginia.

It was listed on the National Register of Historic Places in 1981.

== See also ==
- Greater Huntington Parks and Recreation District
- National Register of Historic Places listings in Cabell County, West Virginia
