= Huntington Cubs =

- 1990–1995; Huntington, West Virginia

Minor league affiliations
- Class: Rookie Advanced (1991–1995); Rookie (1990)
- League: Appalachian League (1990–1995)

Major league affiliations
- Team: Co-op (1995); Chicago Cubs (1990–1994)

Team data
- Name: River City Rumblers (1995); Huntington Cubs (1990–1994)
- Ballpark: St. Cloud Commons (1990–1995)

The Huntington Cubs were a minor league baseball team located in Huntington, West Virginia. The team played in the Appalachian League, and was affiliated with the Chicago Cubs. Their home stadium was St. Cloud Commons. For the 1995 season, the team lost their affiliation with the Chicago Cubs and were known as the River City Rumblers.

== History ==
The Huntington Cubs changed their name to the River City Rumblers after the Cubs moved their rookie league affiliation to Florida and was operated as a co-op club with nine organization contributing players to the roster. Initially, the team chose the name River City Rampage, but were given a cease-and-desist from a company in Ashland, Kentucky who claimed it violated their Ram-Page brand name.

The Rumblers were managed by Phillip Wellman and finished last at 22-45 in the league. Their total attendance in 1995 of 20,631 was second worst in the 10-team Appalachian League. The franchise folded after the 1995 season after no major league franchise was willing to affiliate with the team.

Broadcaster and MLB Network host Matt Vasgersian started his baseball broadcasting career in 1991 announcing Huntington Cubs games.

== Former Players ==
- Terry Adams
- Richie Barker
- Britt Bonneau
- Geremi González
- Ryan Hawblitzel
- Javier Martínez
- Jason Maxwell
- Steve Rain
- Jason Ryan
- Jason Sehorn
- Dave Stevens
- Amaury Telemaco
- Pedro Valdés
- Julio Zuleta
