= Veterans Memorial Field =

Stadium in Altoona, Pennsylvania

Coordinates: 40.5066°N 78.4121°W

Veterans Memorial Field, locally known as Vets Field, is a stadium in Altoona, Pennsylvania. It is primarily used for baseball and was the home of Altoona Rail Kings. The ballpark has a capacity of 3,000.

It is located in the Westmont neighborhood of Altoona, near the Jaffa Shrine. Today the stadium hosts youth sporting events.
