= Greater Huntington Park and Recreation District =

American government agency

Coordinates: 38.4232°N 82.4408°W

Parks & Recreation overview
- Formed: 1990
- Type: Parks & Recreation
- Headquarters: 210 11th Street, Shop #1, Huntington, West Virginia
- Website: Official Website

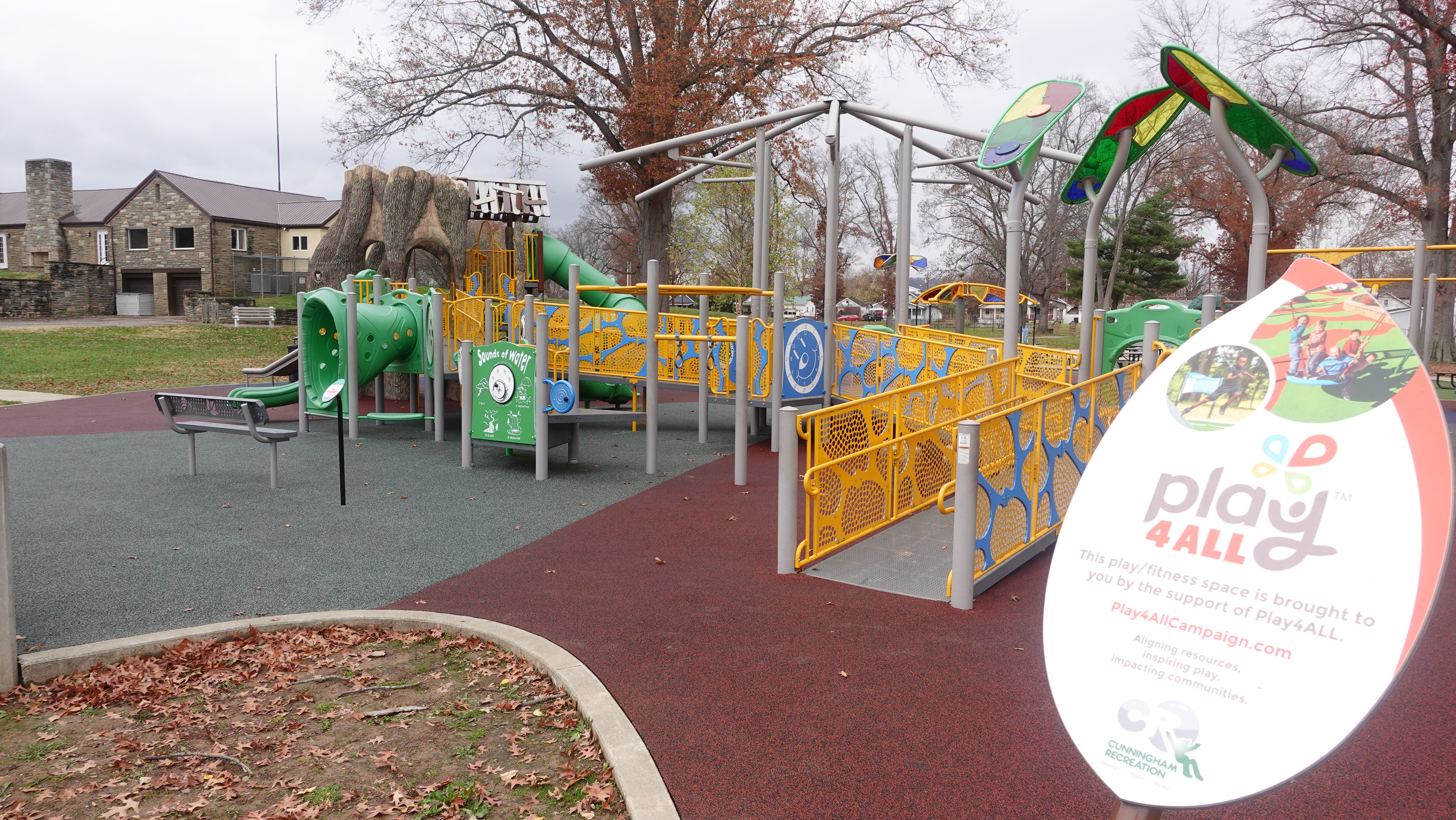
The St. Clouds Commons Playground in 2023.

Greater Huntington Park and Recreation District (GHPRD) is the parks and recreation government agency for Huntington, West Virginia, USA. Founded in 1990, the GHPRD has 19 employees including their Executive Director, Kathy McKenna.

== Parks and recreation ==
Greater Huntington Park and Recreation District currently manages 16 different parks and recreation.

- Altizer Park
- April Dawn Park
- Camp Mad Anthony Wayne
- Harris Riverfront Park
- Harverytown Park
- Heritage Station
- Huntington's PetSmart Dog Park
- Mcelland Park
- Memorial Park
- Ritter Park
- Ritter Park Rose Garden
- Rotary Park
- RPA Park
- St. Cloud Commons
- Veterans Memorial Park
- West Moreland Park

== See also ==
- Recreation in Huntington, West Virginia
