= President's House (Marshall University) =

Historic house in Huntington, West Virginia, United States

- President's House, Marshall University
- U.S. National Register of Historic Places
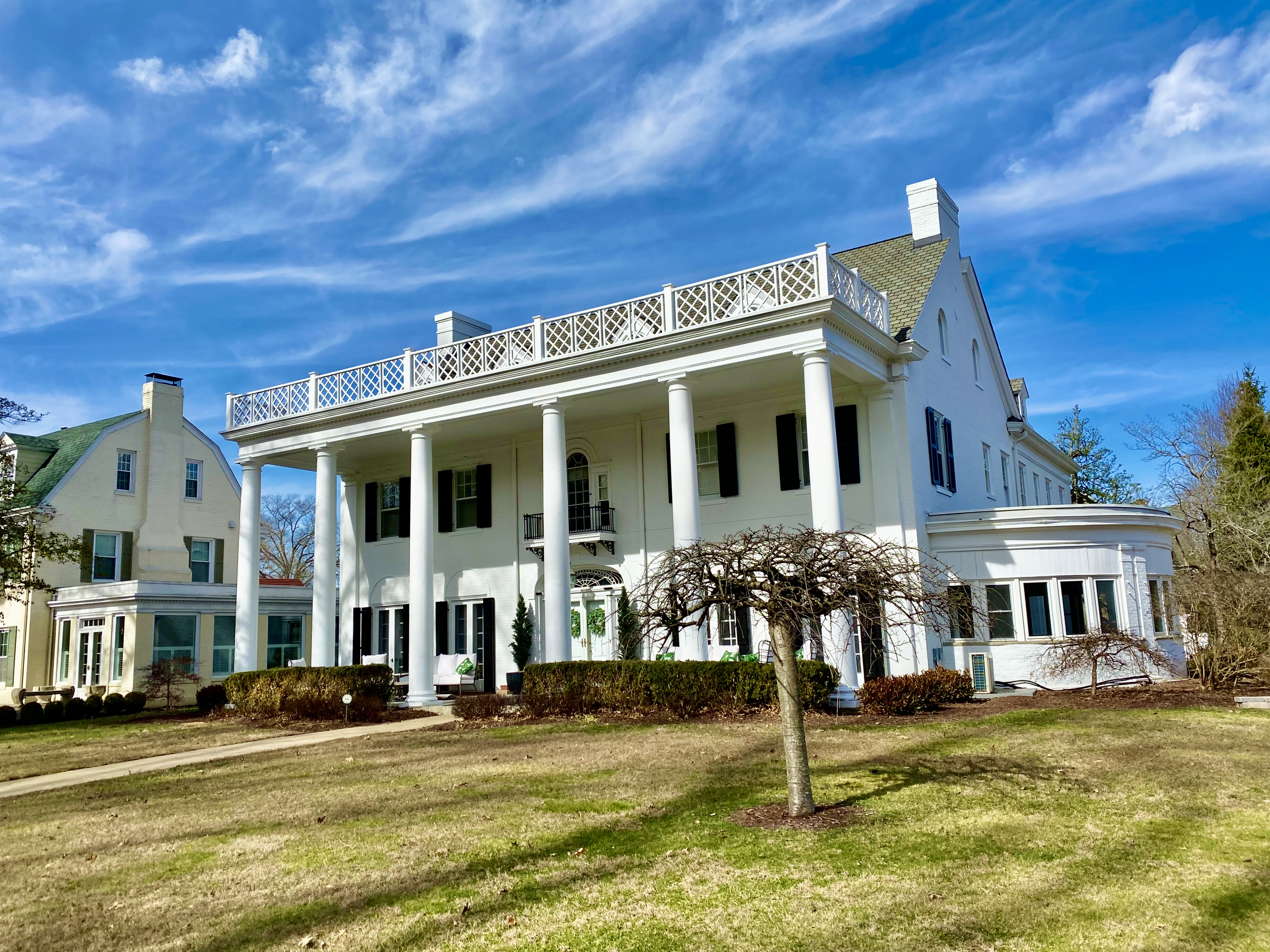
- The Marshall University President's House in 2023

- Location within West Virginia Location within the United States
- Location: 1040 13th Avenue, Huntington, West Virginia 25701
- Coordinates: 38°24′33.516″N 82°26′14.316″W
- Architectural style: Neoclassical; Greek Revival
- NRHP reference No.: 90001774
- Added to NRHP: 1990

President's House, historically known as Campbell-Staats House, is a historic home located next to the Campbell House in the Ritter Park Historic District in Huntington, West Virginia.

== History ==
It was built in 1923 and was originally for the one-term mayor Charles Campbell, and is an 11,710 square-foot, Neoclassical and Greek Revival dwelling. The building was later purchased by Marshall University in 1971.

It was listed on the National Register of Historic Places in 1990.

== See also ==
- National Register of Historic Places listings in Cabell County, West Virginia
