= Jason Ryan (baseball) =

American baseball player (born 1976)

- Pitcher
- Born: January 23, 1976 (age 49); Long Branch, New Jersey, U.S.
- Batted: Switch Threw: Right

MLB debut
- August 24, 1999, for the Minnesota Twins

Last MLB appearance
- October 1, 2000, for the Minnesota Twins

MLB statistics
- Win–loss record: 1–5
- Earned run average: 5.94
- Strikeouts: 34
- Stats at Baseball Reference

Teams
- Minnesota Twins (1999–2000)

Jason Paul Ryan (born January 23, 1976) is an American former Major League Baseball pitcher. He played during two seasons at the major league level for the Minnesota Twins. He was drafted by the Chicago Cubs in the ninth round of the 1994 amateur draft. Ryan played his first professional season with their Rookie league teams (Huntington Cubs and Gulf Coast Cubs) and their Double-A Orlando Cubs in 1994, and split his last season with the Triple-A affiliates of the Pittsburgh Pirates (Nashville Sounds) and Los Angeles Dodgers (Las Vegas 51s) in 2005.

Ryan grew up in Bound Brook, New Jersey and attended Immaculata High School in Somerville, New Jersey.
