= Altoona Rail Kings =

- 1996–1997; Altoona, Pennsylvania

Minor league affiliations
- Class: Independent (1996-1997)
- League: Heartland League (1997); North Atlantic League (1996)
- Division: Northern Division

Team data
- Name: Altoona Rail Kings (1996-1997)
- Colors: Green, red, gold, white
- Ballpark: Vets Field (1996-1997)

The Altoona Rail Kings were a former independent baseball team, playing their home games at Veterans Memorial Field in Altoona, Pennsylvania averaging nearly 1,200 fans per game.

They played two seasons, 1996 in the North Atlantic League, and 1997 in the Heartland League. In 1996, the Rail Kings finished 36-42. In 1997, they finished 22-14 in the Northern Division's first half, and 14-22 in the second. They finished second and third place in their respective leagues. They did make the playoffs, losing in two straight games to the Anderson Lawmen.

When the Pittsburgh Pirates-affiliated AA franchise was awarded to Altoona, the Rail Kings relocated to Huntington, West Virginia, for the 1998 season—playing at the St. Cloud Commons, they retained the Rail King name but redesigned their logo to feature a crowned H rather than an A.

The Rail Kings remained in the Heartland League. The Huntington Rail Kings did not finish the 1998 season, closing due to poor attendance. The Altoona Curve arrived in Altoona in 1999.

Today, the Rail Kings name lives on at Blair County Ballpark, where the best seats are designated "Rail King." The Rail Kings' mascot was R.K. Two other names considered for the team were used later by affiliated teams: the Spikes, now used by State College, and the Curve, used by the current AA team.

Players for the initial season included:

- Jeff Andrews
- Eric Burroughs
- Mike Cacciotti
- Peter Dallas
- Howard Hill
- Mark Hilyard
- Anthony Iasparro
- Karun Jackson
- Farley Love
- Travis Maxwell
- Carlos Mirabal
- Tim Mitchell
- Paul Neatrour
- Manny Perez
- Billy Reed
- Stanley Scales
- Ray Schmittle
- Anthony Sharer
- John Smith
- Doug Smyly
- Tony Webster
- Eric Yelding
- Tommy Seasoltz (batboy)

Player Information

Player	Bats	Throws	Birthday	Height	Weight	Hometown
Jeff Andrews	R	R	October 22, 1971	6'0"	185	Arab, AL US
Eric Burroughs	L	L	October 31, 1969	5'9"	165	Thomasville, AL US
Mike Caccioti	L	L				
Jon Choate	L	R	September 14, 1973	5'11"	185	Houston, TX US
Stacy Chupailo	R	R	February 16, 1976	6'4"	195	Muskegon, MI US
Peter Dallas	R	R	May 30, 1974	6'4"	205	Deerfield, IL US
Tommy Hearn	R	R				
Dominic Hernandez	R	R				
Howard Hill	L	L				
Mark Hilyard	R	R				
Anthony Iasparro	R	R				
K. J. Jackson	R	R	May 3, 1971	5'9"	170	Mobile, AL US
Darren Jones	R	R				
Hank Lott	L	L	November 27, 1966	6'6"	205	Chicago, IL US
Farley Love	R	R	April 21, 1973	6'6"	200	Fort Ord, CA US
Travis Maxwell	R	R		5'9"	160	
Carlos Mirabal	R	R	April 24, 1973	6'0"	169	
Tim Mitchell	L	L	June 7, 1971	6'2"	230	
Paul Neatrour	R	R				
Manny Perez	R	R				
William Posteluk	L	L				
Tobias Price	L	L	August 11, 1974	6'2"	225	San Diego, CA US
Billy Reed	R	R	May 9, 1973	5'10"	160	Birmingham, AL US
Michael Richmond	R	R				
Willie Roland	R	R	October 23, 1973	5'10"	190	Corpus Christi, TX US
Jake Scaffidi	S	R				
Stan Scales	R	R	May 20, 1971	5'11"	172	Talladega, AL US
Ray Schmittle	L	L	August 10, 1974	5'11"	200	Altoona, PA US
Tony Sharer	R	R	July 22, 1975	6'1"	185	Tyrone, PA US
John Smith	R	R	October 21, 1976	6'2"	220	Passaic, NJ US
Doug Smyly	R	R	January 29, 1973	6'5"	205	Miami, FL US
Joey Vreonis	R	R	December 17, 1971	6'4"	235	Pittsburg, CA US
Matt Weber	R	R				
Tony Webster	R	R				
Grey Wilkinson	R	R	August 29, 1974	6'2"	185	Houston, TX US
Eric Yelding	R	R	February 22, 1965	5'11"	170	Montrose, AL US

Management included:

- Owner/President: Eric Reichert
- General Manager: Mike Richmond
- Director of Media Relations: Dave Shannon
- Director of Sales and Marketing: Shawn McIntire
- Account Executive: Eddie Depp
- Manager: Tommy Hearn
- Coach: Michael Richmond
- Athletic trainer: Bryant Musselman
