= Ritter Park Historic District =

Historic district in West Virginia, United States

- U.S. National Register of Historic Places
- U.S. Historic district
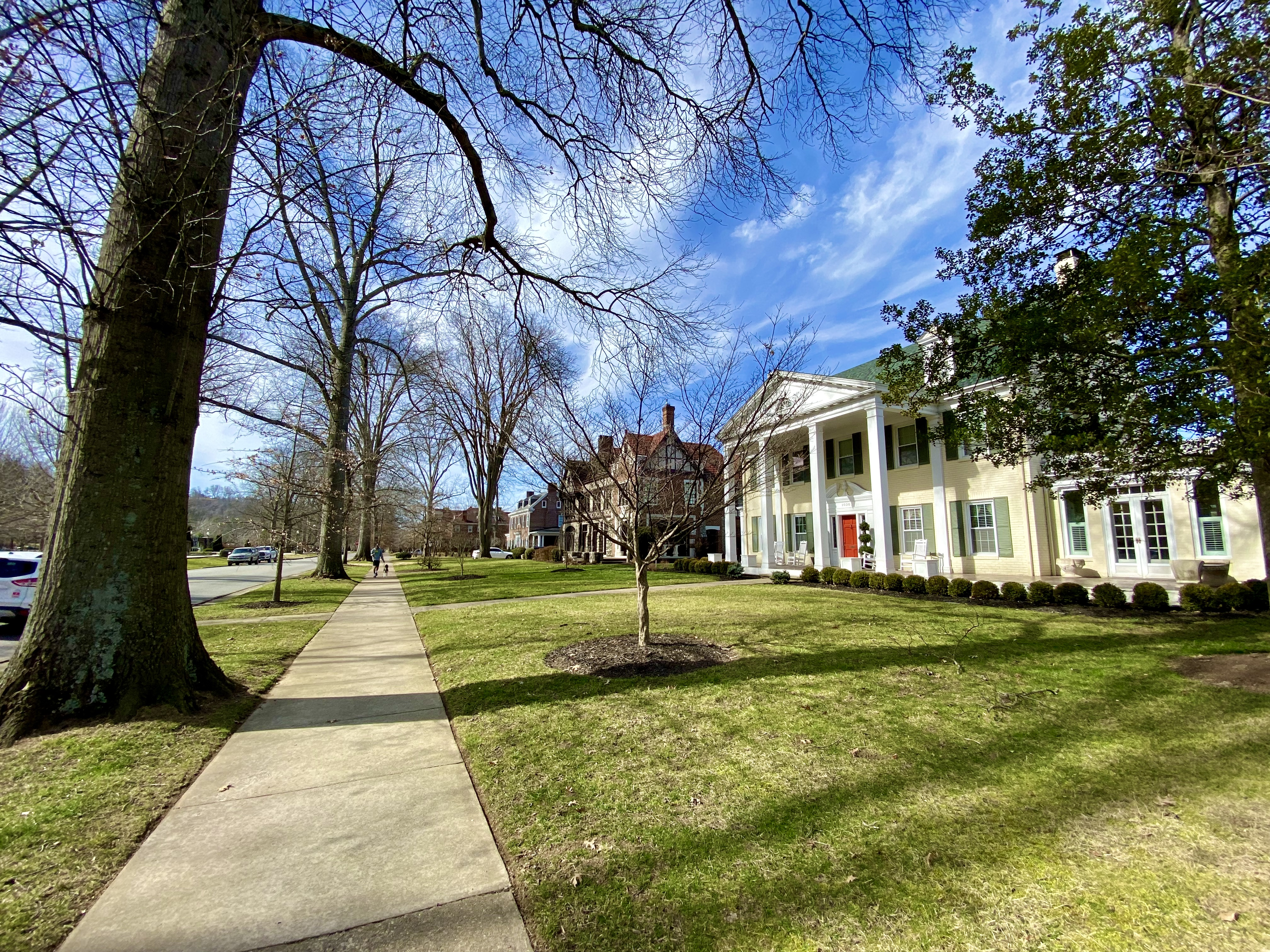
- Houses along 13th Avenue in 2023.

- Location within West Virginia Location within the United States
- Location: Ritter Park, including northern boundary streets, Huntington, West Virginia
- Coordinates: 38°24′15″N 82°26′16″W
- Area: 120 acres (49 ha)
- Architect: Multiple
- Architectural style: Colonial Revival, Bungalow/craftsman, Tudor Revival
- NRHP reference No.: 90001774
- Added to NRHP: November 28, 1990

Ritter Park Historic District is a national historic district located at Huntington, West Virginia. The district encompasses 68 contributing buildings and 5 contributing structures, including the Ritter Park municipal park. The city purchased the park property in 1908. Dwellings in the district represent the finest styles in popular architecture from the years 1913 to 1940, including Colonial Revival, Bungalow/craftsman, and Tudor Revival.

It was listed on the National Register of Historic Places in 1990.

== Notable buildings ==
- Cammack House (1923)
- Campbell House (1923)
- Marshall University President's House (1923)
- Park Terrace Apartments (c. 1939–1940)
- Ritter Park Apartments (1932)
- Weingartner House (c. 1923)

== See also ==
- National Register of Historic Places listings in Cabell County, West Virginia
- Ritter Park
