= Ritter Park =

Public Park in West Virginia, United States

- The Ritter Park Arches in 2015.
- Location: 910 13th Ave, Huntington, West Virginia 25701
- Coordinates: 38°24′32.04″N 82°26′23.28″W
- Opened: 1913
- Founder: Rufus Switzer
- Designer: Gus Wofford
- Owned by: Greater Huntington Parks and Recreation District
- Website: Official Website

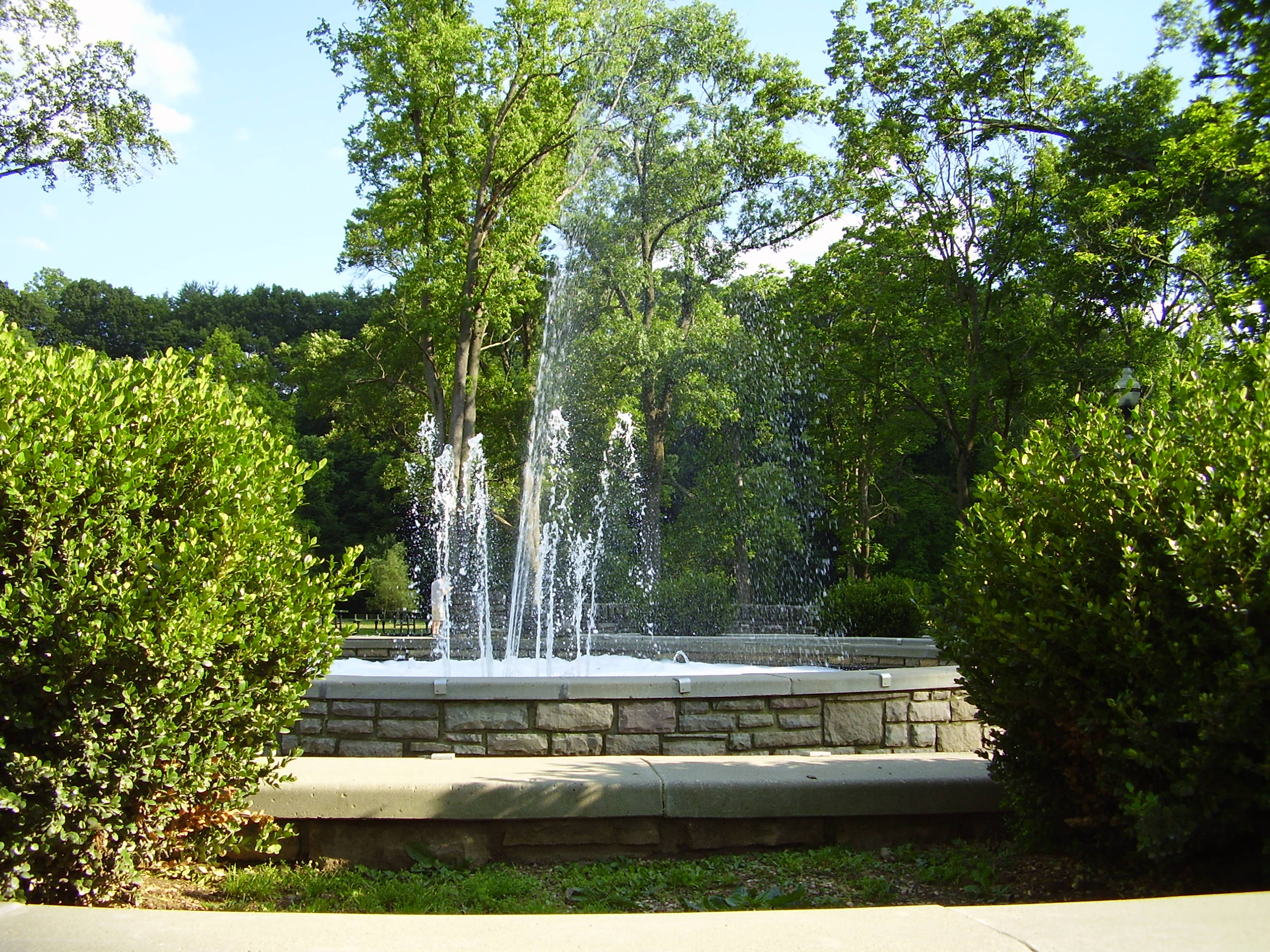
The Ritter Park Fountain in 2006.

Ritter Park is a public park in Huntington, West Virginia. Ritter Park, also known as the heart of Huntington, is operated and owned by the Greater Huntington Parks and Recreation District.

== History ==
In 1908, Rufus Switzer, the future mayor of Huntington, pushed the city to purchase 75 acres of land on 13th Avenue to construct Ritter Park. Five years later in 1913, the park opened to the public. The park was named after lumberman, Charles Ritter, who donated 20 acres of land for the creation of the park.

In 2011, Huntington won the Bark for Your Park contest, hosted by PetSafe, and won a grand prize of $100,000 for the construction of Huntington's Petsafe Dog Park which later opened in 2012.

In 2017, Huntington put aside $236,000 to reconstruct the Ritter Park Playground. Before this, the playground was built in 1987 with an Alice in Wonderland design, the new remodel now has a woodland forest design.

== Amenities ==
- Footbridges (3)
- Hiking/Biking Trails (9)
- Huntington's Petsafe Dog Park
- Pickleball Courts (8)
- Playground
  - including a Zipline, and a sand pit
- Picnic Shelters (2)
- Recreational Field
- Ritter Park Amphitheater
- Ritter Park Fountain
- Ritter Park Rose Garden
- Tennis Courts (11)

== Events and fairs ==
Ritter Park is home to numerous events and fairs throughout the year.

Name	Date	Description	Reference
Art in the Park	First Weekend in June	An arts market and festival from local artists.	
Funktafest	Second Saturday in October	A music and arts festival, held in the Ritter Park Amphitheatre.	
Graffiti in the Park Car Show	Second Saturday in June	An annual car show, that emphasizes on car paints and wraps.	
Huntington Music & Arts Festival	Last Saturday in September	Festival centered around local and regional music and visual artists, held in the Ritter Park Amphitheatre.	
Ritter Park Days	Weekends in July and August.	Features children-based activities and programs.	
Paws in the Park Easter Egg Hunt	The day before Easter Sunday	A dog-friendly easter egg hunt, that has been held since 1935.	

== Popular culture ==
- Rand University, a feature-length 30 for 30 documentary, explores Randy Moss's origins, with Chad Pennington's back drop being a Ritter Park trail

== See also ==
- Greater Huntington Parks and Recreation District
- Recreation in Huntington, West Virginia
- Ritter Park Historic District
