= Huntington–Ashland metropolitan area =

- Metropolitan Statistical Area
- Charleston–Huntington–Ashland, WV–OH–KY
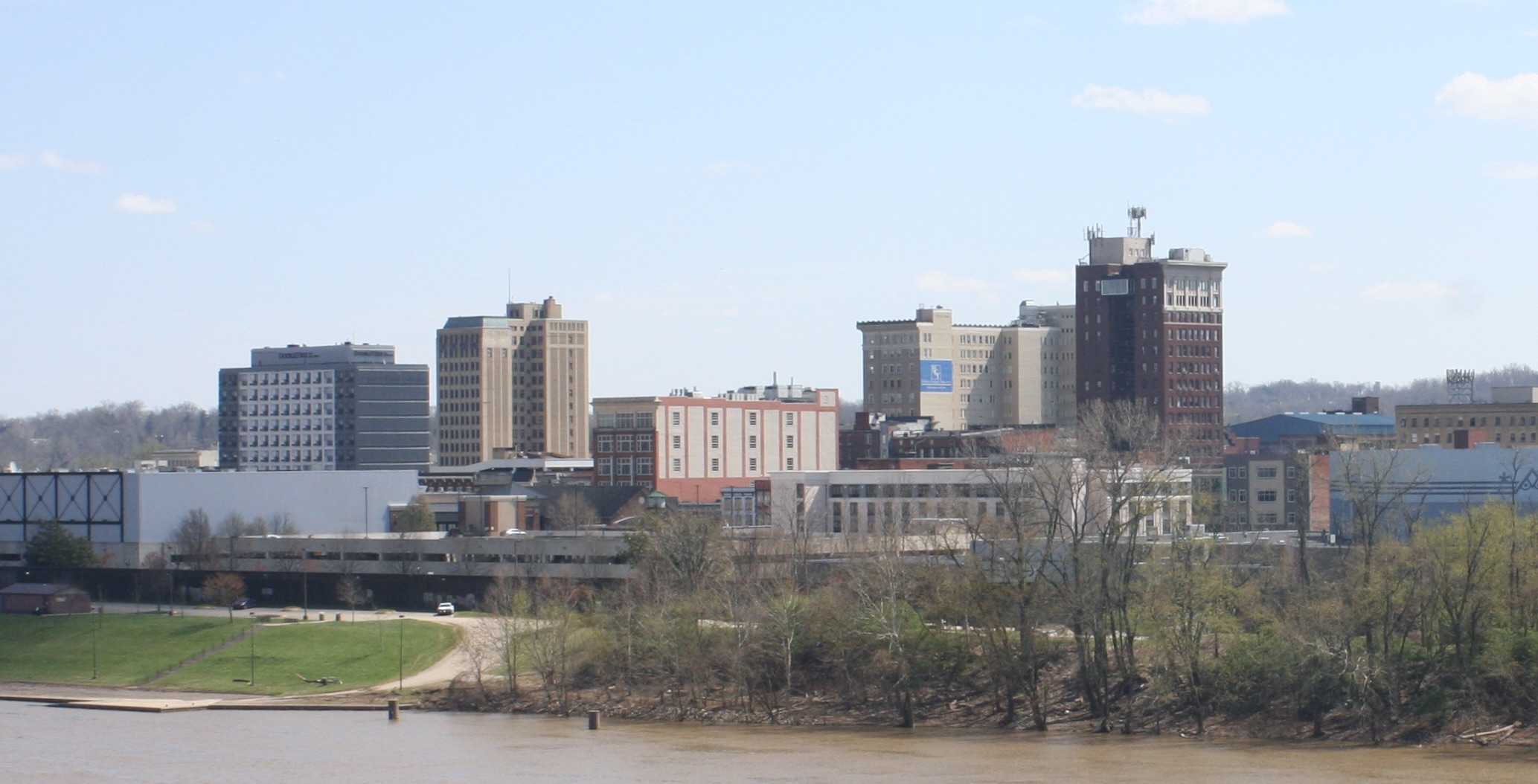
- Downtown Huntington
Charleston–Huntington–Ashland, WV–OH–KY CSA
Charleston, WV MSA
Huntington–Ashland, WV–KY–OH MSA
Portsmouth, OH µSA
City of Charleston
City of Huntington
City of Ashland
- Country: United States
- State: West Virginia; Kentucky; Ohio
- Largest city: Huntington
- Other cities: Ashland; Portsmouth; Ironton; Teays Valley; Flatwoods

Area
  - Total: 2,159.9 sq mi (5,594 km^{2})
- Highest elevation: 1,512 ft (461 m)
- Lowest elevation: 486 ft (148 m)

Population (2015 est.)
  - Total: 361,580
  - Rank: 146th in the U.S.
  - Density: 167/sq mi (64.6/km^{2})

GDP
  - Total: $32.937 billion (2022)
- Time zone: UTC−5 (EST)
  - Summer (DST): UTC−4 (EDT)

The Huntington–Ashland metropolitan area is a metropolitan area partially in the U.S. states of West Virginia, Kentucky, and Ohio, located in the Appalachian Plateau. Referred to locally as the "Tri-state area", and colloquially as "Kyova" (portmanteau of Kentucky, Ohio, and West Virginia), the region spans a total of eight counties across the three states. With a population of 376,155 at the 2020 U.S. census, it is the most populous metropolitan area in West Virginia. The tri-state area is nestled along the banks of the Ohio River and offers a range of outdoor activities. The Huntington–Ashland MSA is the largest single metro area in the state of West Virginia, and is a component of the broader Charleston–Huntington–Ashland combined statistical area (CSA).

== Counties ==
County	State	Seat	2025 estimate	2020 census	Change	Area	Density
Cabell	West Virginia	Huntington	91,183	94,350	−3.36%	288 sq mi (750 km^{2})	317/sq mi (122/km^{2})
Putnam	West Virginia	Winfield	56,885	57,440	−0.97%	350 sq mi (910 km^{2})	163/sq mi (63/km^{2})
Lawrence	Ohio	Ironton	55,710	58,240	−4.34%	457 sq mi (1,180 km^{2})	122/sq mi (47/km^{2})
Boyd	Kentucky	Catlettsburg	47,751	48,261	−1.06%	162 sq mi (420 km^{2})	295/sq mi (114/km^{2})
Wayne	West Virginia	Wayne	37,309	38,982	−4.29%	512 sq mi (1,330 km^{2})	73/sq mi (28/km^{2})
Greenup	Kentucky	Greenup	35,213	35,962	−2.08%	354 sq mi (920 km^{2})	99/sq mi (38/km^{2})
Carter	Kentucky	Grayson	26,149	26,627	−1.80%	412 sq mi (1,070 km^{2})	63/sq mi (25/km^{2})
Lawrence	Kentucky	Louisa	15,765	16,293	−3.24%	420 sq mi (1,100 km^{2})	38/sq mi (14/km^{2})
Total			365,965	376,155	−2.71%	2,958 sq mi (7,660 km^{2})	124/sq mi (48/km^{2})

== Communities ==
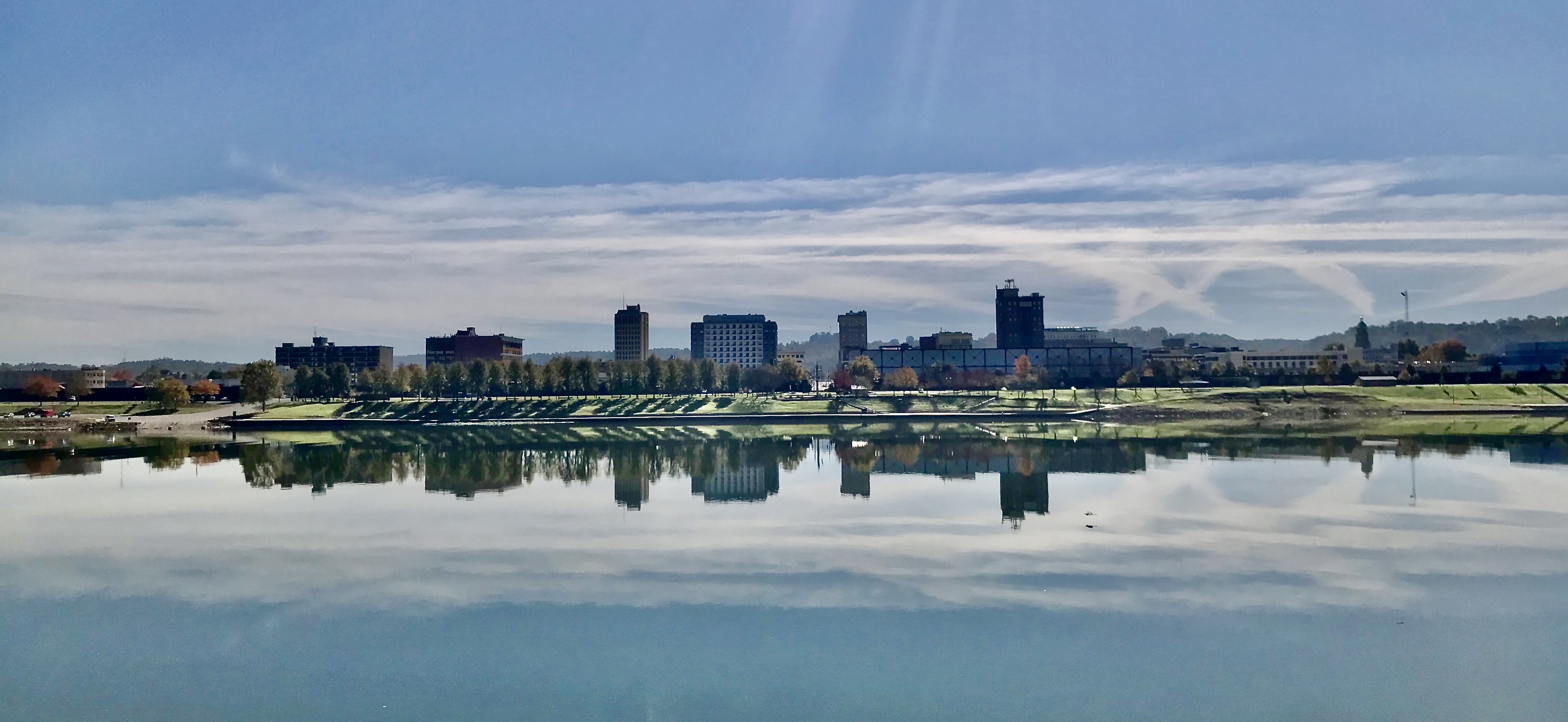
Huntington, West Virginia

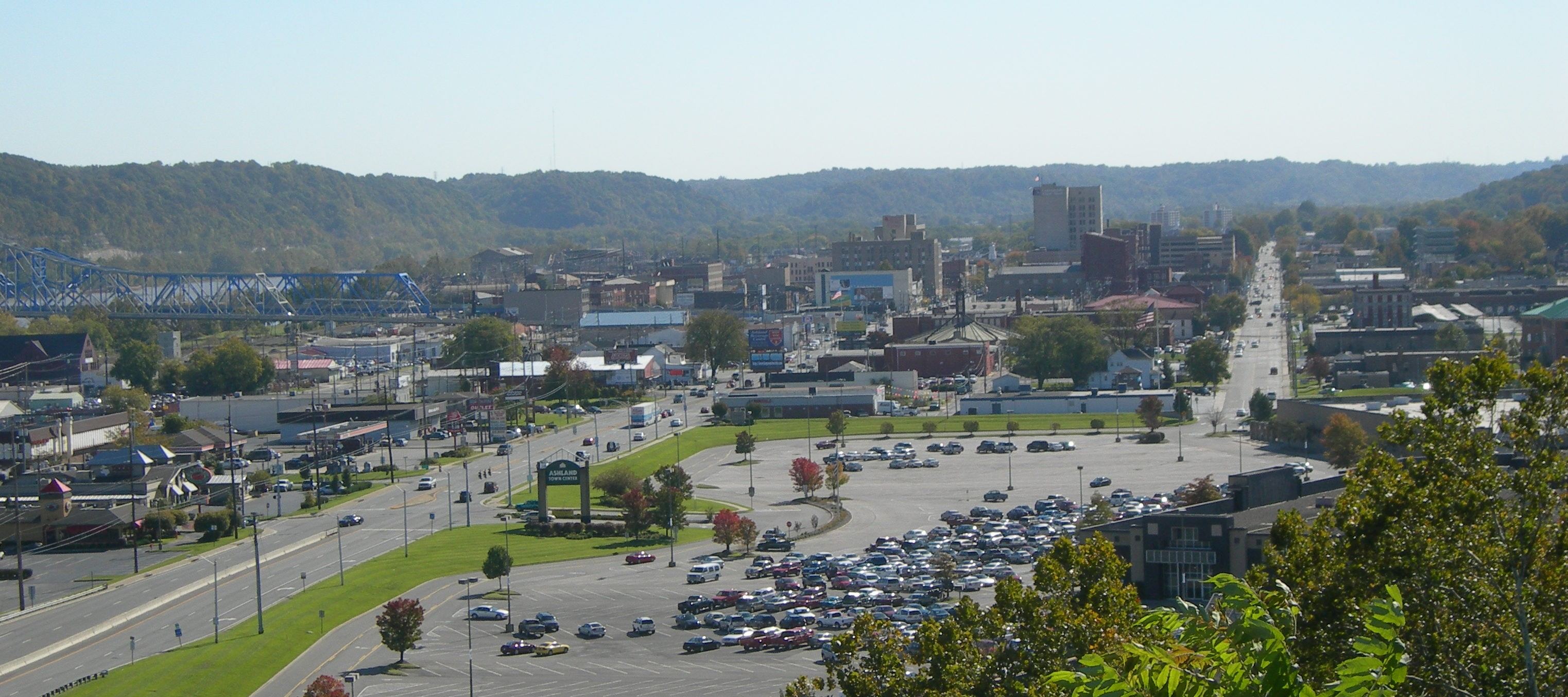
Ashland, Kentucky

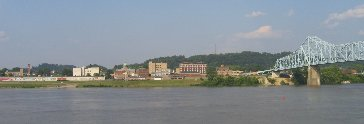
Ironton, Ohio

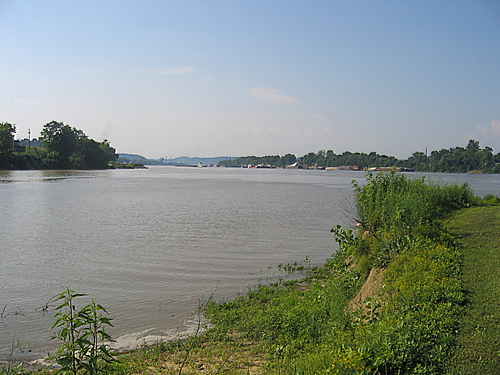
The confluence of the Big Sandy (left) and Ohio (right) Rivers, as well as shores in the states of Kentucky (back left) and Ohio (back right), at Virginia Point Park in Kenova, West Virginia

=== Largest cities (more than 5,000 inhabitants) ===
City	Population as of the 2020 Census	Note
Huntington, West Virginia	46,842	Principal city of the MSA
Ashland, Kentucky	21,625	Principal city of the MSA
Teays Valley, West Virginia	14,350	Census-designated place
Ironton, Ohio	10,571	Incorporated city
Flatwoods, Kentucky	7,325	Incorporated city
Hurricane, West Virginia	6,977	Incorporated city
Pea Ridge, West Virginia	6,602	Census-designated place

=== Places with 1,000 to 5,000 inhabitants ===
- Barboursville, West Virginia
- Buffalo, West Virginia
- Burlington, Ohio (census-designated place)
- Catlettsburg, Kentucky
- Ceredo, West Virginia
- Coal Grove, Ohio
- Culloden, West Virginia (census-designated place)
- Eleanor, West Virginia
- Grayson, Kentucky
- Greenup, Kentucky
- Hamlin, West Virginia
- Kenova, West Virginia
- Lavalette, West Virginia
- Lesage, West Virginia (census-designated place)
- Louisa, Kentucky
- Milton, West Virginia
- Nitro, West Virginia (partial) (Note: While Nitro's total population is over 5,000, most of its population lives in Kanawha County, which is in the Charleston metropolitan area.)
- Olive Hill, Kentucky
- Raceland, Kentucky
- Rush, Kentucky (census-designated place)
- Russell, Kentucky
- South Point, Ohio
- South Shore, Kentucky
- Wayne, West Virginia
- Westwood, Kentucky (census-designated place)
- Worthington, Kentucky
- Winfield, West Virginia

=== Places with fewer than 1,000 inhabitants ===
- Athalia, Ohio
- Bancroft, West Virginia
- Bellefonte, Kentucky
- Chesapeake, Ohio
- Fort Gay, West Virginia
- Hanging Rock, Ohio
- Lavalette, West Virginia (census-designated place)
- Poca, West Virginia
- Proctorville, Ohio
- West Hamlin, West Virginia
- Wurtland, Kentucky

=== Unincorporated places ===
- Alkol, West Virginia
- Armilda, West Virginia
- Atenville, West Virginia
- Brabant, West Virginia
- Branchland, West Virginia
- Cannonsburg, Kentucky
- Coalton, Kentucky
- Confidence, West Virginia
- Crum, West Virginia
- Culloden, West Virginia
- Dunlow, West Virginia
- East Lynn, West Virginia
- Echo, West Virginia
- Eden Park, West Virginia
- Etna, Ohio
- Ferrellsburg, West Virginia
- Fourteen, West Virginia
- Fraziers Bottom, West Virginia
- Fry, West Virginia
- Genoa, West Virginia
- Gill, West Virginia
- Green Shoal, West Virginia
- Griffithsville, West Virginia
- Hometown, West Virginia
- Ironville, Kentucky
- Kitts Hill, Ohio
- Lanham, West Virginia
- Leet, West Virginia
- Liberty, West Virginia
- Meads, Kentucky
- Midway, West Virginia
- Midkiff, West Virginia
- Ona, West Virginia
- Pedro, Ohio
- Pleasant View, West Virginia
- Pliny, West Virginia
- Princess, Kentucky
- Ranger, West Virginia
- Rector, West Virginia
- Raymond City, West Virginia
- Red House, West Virginia
- Rock Camp, Ohio
- Rockdale, Kentucky
- Salt Rock, West Virginia
- Sod, West Virginia
- Scott Depot, West Virginia
- Scottown, Ohio
- Spurlockville, West Virginia
- Sumerco, West Virginia
- Summit, Kentucky
- Sweetland, West Virginia
- Teays, West Virginia
- Warren, West Virginia
- Waterloo, Ohio
- Wewanta, West Virginia
- Willow Wood, Ohio
- Wilsondale, West Virginia
- Yawkey, West Virginia

== Townships (Lawrence County, Ohio) ==
- Aid
- Decatur
- Elizabeth
- Fayette
- Hamilton
- Lawrence
- Mason
- Perry
- Rome
- Symmes
- Union
- Upper
- Washington
- Windsor

== Demographics ==
As of 2018, there were 352,823 people and 136,769 households residing within the MSA. The racial makeup of the MSA was 93.9% White, 2.6% African American, 0.1% Native American, 0.5% Asian, 0.1% Pacific Islander, 0.1% from other races, and 1.8% from two or more races. Hispanic or Latino of any race were 1% of the population.

The median income for a household in the MSA was $45,535. The per capita income for the MSA was $25,801. 18.2% of the population is beneath the poverty line, including 23% of children and 11% of seniors.

In 2008, an Associated Press article designated the Huntington–Ashland metropolitan area as the unhealthiest in America, based on its analysis of data collected in 2006 by the Centers for Disease Control and Prevention. Nearly half the adults in this metropolitan area were obese.

== Major highways ==
- Interstate 64
- U.S. Route 23
- U.S. Route 52
- U.S. Route 60
- West Virginia Route 2
- West Virginia Route 10
- West Virginia Route 152
- West Virginia Route 527
- Kentucky Route 3
- John Y. Brown Jr. AA Highway (KY 10)
- Industrial Parkway (KY 67)
- Kentucky Route 180
- Ohio State Route 7
- Ohio State Route 93
- Ohio State Route 527

== Area codes ==
The following prefixes are used for long-distance phone service dialing to the region within the MSA.

- 304, 681 – West Virginia Counties
- 606 – Kentucky Counties
- 740, 220 – Ohio

== Higher education ==
- Ashland Community and Technical College
- Collins Career Center
- Huntington Junior College
- Marshall University
- Morehead State University at Ashland
- Mountwest Community and Technical College
- Ohio University Southern Campus

== See also ==
- Kentucky census statistical areas
- Ohio census statistical areas
- West Virginia census statistical areas
- List of museums in Huntington–Ashland metropolitan area
