= Lincoln County High School (West Virginia) =

Location
- 81 Panther Way; Hamlin, West Virginia 25523; United States
- 38°16′32.8″N 82°6′58.4″W

Information
- Type: Public secondary school
- School district: Lincoln County Schools
- Superintendent: Frank Barnett
- Principal: John Roy
- Teaching staff: 56.50 (on an FTE basis)
- Grades: 9-12
- Enrollment: 837 (2023-2024)
- Student to teacher ratio: 14.81
- Colors: Carolina Blue; Black; Silver
- Nickname: Panthers
- Website: www.lincolncountypanthers.net

Lincoln County High School is a Class AAA high school in Hamlin, West Virginia. It was built between 2004 and 2006 and completed in time for the 2006/07 school year.

== Consolidation ==
Lincoln County High School was formed from four former high schools in the county: Guyan Valley High School in Pleasant View, Duval High School in Griffithsville, Hamlin High School in Hamlin, and Harts High School in Harts.

The idea for consolidation was discussed for years, and protests and votes held the process back. Finally in 2000 due to low standardized test scores and poor school conditions the state board of education took over the county school system. Almost immediately consolidation was put into action and Lincoln County High School was built. Many possible spots for which the school would have been built include the area around Mud River Lake in the central part of the county but the town of Hamlin was chosen due to it being the political center of the county.

Dana Snyder, principal of the consolidated Duval High School, was hired as the school’s first principal in 2006. Snyder would serve as Lincoln County High School’s principal until his retirement in 2019.

== Athletics ==
Lincoln County High School's Panther's colors are Carolina blue, black, and silver.

The LCHS Softball team won two AAA state championships. The first in 2011 and the second in 2014

The school offers the following West Virginia Secondary School Activities Commission (WVSSAC) sanctioned sports:

- Baseball (boys)
- Basketball (girls and boys)
- Cheerleading (girls)
- Cross country (girls and boys)
- Football (boys)
- Golf (girls and boys)
- Soccer (girls and boys)
- Softball (girls)
- Tennis (girls and boys)
- Track (girls and boys)
- Volleyball (girls)
- Wrestling (boys)
