= Toney, West Virginia =

- Unincorporated community
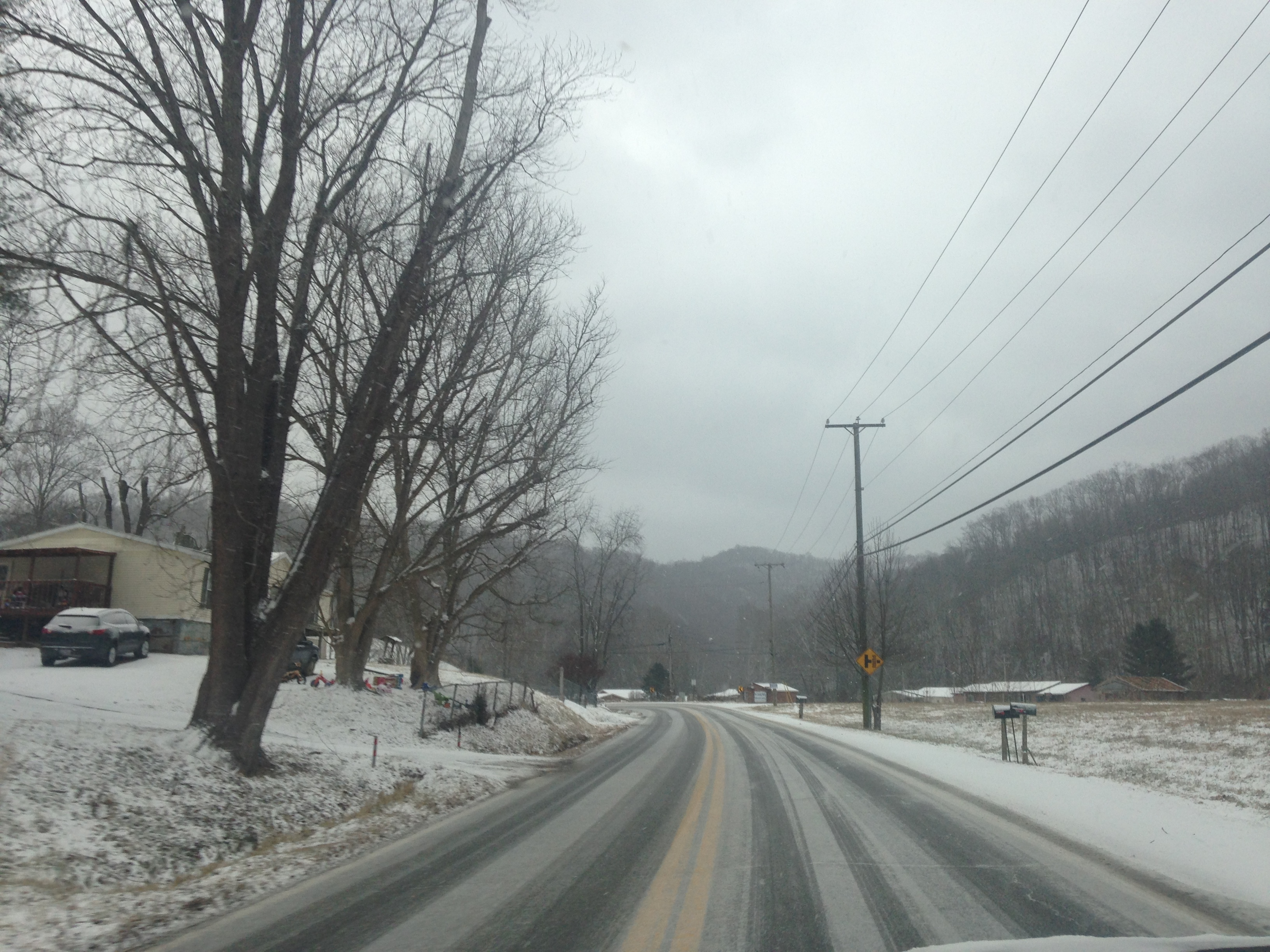
- Toney, WV, 2018

- Location within West Virginia Location within the United States
- Coordinates: 38°00′39″N 82°4′22″W
- Country: United States
- State: West Virginia
- County: Lincoln
- Elevation: 633 ft (193 m)

Population (1911)
  - Total: 298.5
- Time zone: UTC-5 (Eastern (EST))
  - Summer (DST): UTC-4 (EDT)
- Area code: 304
- GNIS feature ID: 1549955

Toney is an unincorporated community in Lincoln County, West Virginia, United States. Its post office was established in 1904 by Brad Toney, merchant.

== Location ==
Toney is generally understood to include the territory along Route 10 above Green Shoal Creek and Abbott Branch extending to the Lincoln-Logan county line. Originally, Toney included territory on both sides of the Guyandotte River. Toney is located in Harts Creek District and is the southernmost community in Lincoln County. Part of the community is located in Logan County. It is situated 3.5 miles from Harts and 6.9 miles from Chapmanville.

== History ==
=== Captain Farley's Raid ===
Captain Henry Farley, a veteran of the Revolutionary War and resident of Montgomery County, Virginia, was the first known Anglo visitor to present-day Toney. In June 1792, Captain Farley passed through the area while pursuing a Native American war party that had raided Virginia settlements at Bluestone River. By the time he reached what is today Toney, he and his group had already engaged the retreating natives in the headwaters of Coal River and in the Guyandotte River valley some two miles below what is today Logan. Farley pursued the natives to the mouth of the Guyandotte River before returning home.

=== Pioneer Settlement ===
Squire Toney, a pioneer resident who was born about 1783, first settled at present-day Toney; John Wood, an early cartographer, identified his cabin in his 1820 map of the lower portion of the valley. Burbus C. Toney (b. 1818), a son of Squire and Nancy (Brown) Toney, subsequently occupied the location. Burbus served as postmaster at nearby Green Shoal from 1855 to 1866. Margaret "Peggy" Toney, daughter of Squire and wife of Andrew Dial, lived on the west side of the Guyandotte River at what became known as Dial Hollow. Josephus H. Workman, an antebellum preacher, also lived in the vicinity of present-day Toney, as did James and Elizabeth (Fields) Ferrell, pioneers from Russell County, Virginia. The offspring of these early families intermarried with one another and with neighbors and settled locally in the bottoms along the river or at nearby Big Ugly Creek. Two of Burbus Toney's offspring—Nancy, who married David Workman, and Bradford—settled at the Toney farm on Guyan River. Bradford Toney and his wife, the former Catherine Saunders, were prosperous merchants in the community.

=== Formation of Town ===
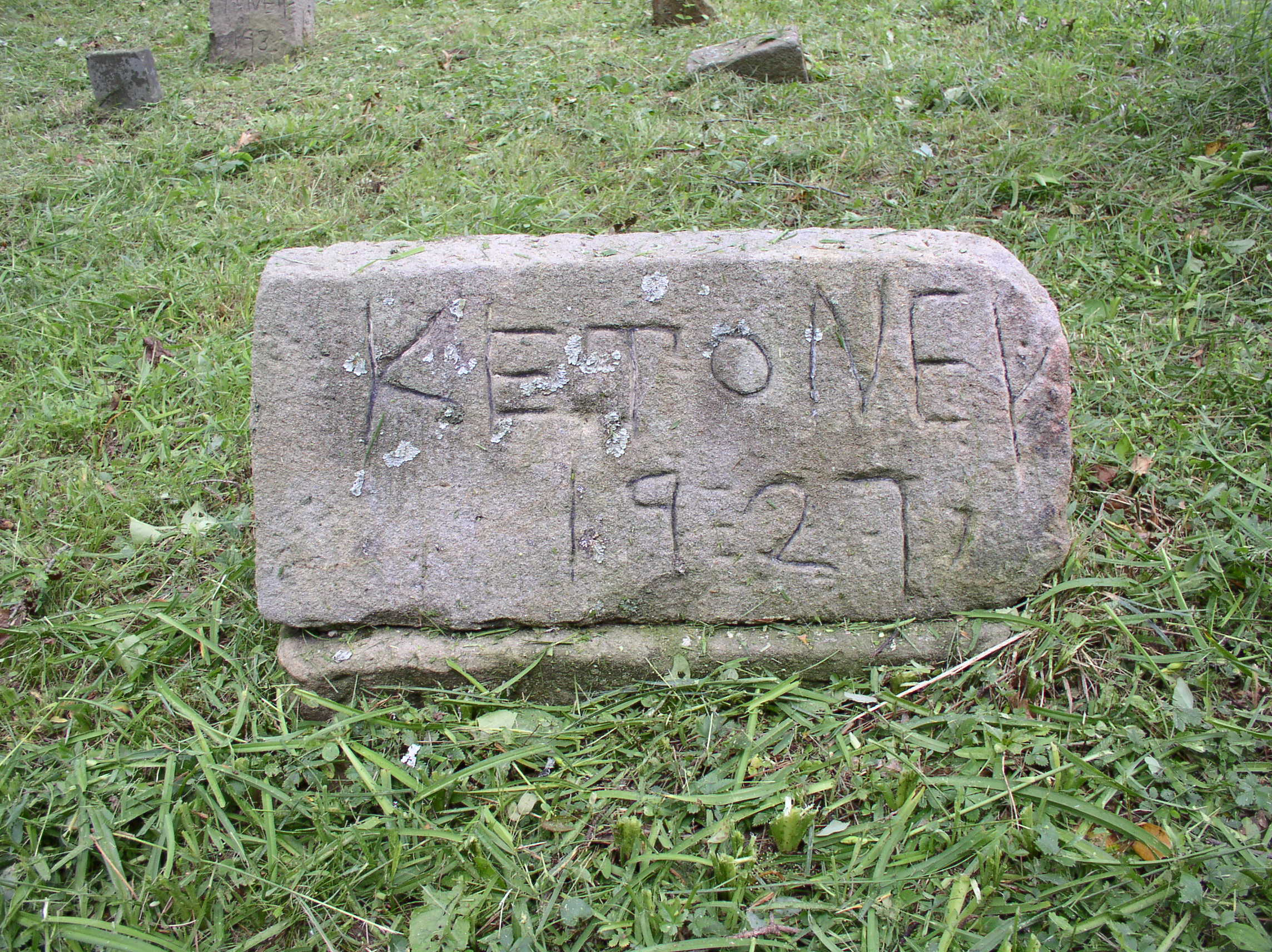
Sheriff Keenan Toney's grave.

Toney was organized shortly after the end of the nineteenth century due to the arrival of the Chesapeake and Ohio Railway in the Guyan Valley, which occurred between 1902 and 1904. The community was named for Brad Toney and its history essentially mirrored that of the local Toney family. Brad Toney's sister-in-law Arena (Saunders) Ferrell operated a store at nearby Ferrellsburg. Brad Toney served as a member of the district board of education from 1914 to 1917. His son, Keenan Toney, was an important merchant and politician. On November 3, 1910, the Lincoln Republican newspaper reported that he was "building a fine dwelling house near the old home place." He served as the first Lincoln County sheriff from Harts Creek District, his term lasting from 1917 to 1921. Jim B. Toney, a brother to Keenan, operated a store at nearby Big Creek. Sibling Peter Mason Toney was likewise a merchant and postmaster. Dollie Toney, daughter of Brad, was a popular local teacher.

Much of the Toney farm was divided into residential lots in the 1950s.

== Economy ==
Timbering served as the primary industry in Toney. Other industries included growing tobacco and cane. Daisy, a nearby coal camp, afforded jobs in coal mining. Members of the Toney family operated stores at Toney for many years. In the modern era, Toney has hosted the following businesses: Lincoln Drive In, Smith's Drive In (later called the Lions' Den), Cush Vance's grocery store, Clovis Manns' timber company, Billy Mullins' used car lot, Kendra's Kurls hair salon, and EFM Group, LLC.

== Schools ==
Toney was the site of a school building in 1889. In that year, a young girl walking out of Green Shoal Creek to school saw the bodies of Milt Haley and Green McCoy at the mouth of the stream; a mob had been murdered the pair as part of the Lincoln County Feud. No schools have existed at Toney in the 20th century; children were educated at Green Shoal School. Students were bussed to Ferrellsburg Grade School (Kindergarten - 6th grade) and Harts High School (7th grade - 12th grade).

Today, local youth attend Harts PreK-8, Chapmanville Middle School, and Chapmanville Regional High School.

== Churches ==
Early church activity occurred in homes or in nearby schoolhouses. Toney Christian Fellowship was established in the early 1970s.

== Recreation ==
At different times, a large field has been used for baseball or softball. In the 1990s and early 2000s, it was known as the Field of Dreams.
