= Palermo, West Virginia =

- Unincorporated community
- Location within West Virginia Location within the United States
- Coordinates: 38°10′10″N 82°03′30″W
- Country: United States
- State: West Virginia
- County: Lincoln
- Elevation: 692 ft (211 m)
- Time zone: UTC-5 (Eastern (EST))
  - Summer (DST): UTC-4 (EDT)
- Area codes: 304 & 681
- GNIS feature ID: 1549868

Palermo is an unincorporated community in Lincoln County, West Virginia, United States. Palermo is located on the Mud River and County Routes 46 and 58, 7.9 miles (12.7 km) south-southeast of Hamlin. Palermo had a post office, which closed on February 1, 1997.

The community was named after Palermo, Sicily.
