= Gill, West Virginia =

Unincorporated community in West Virginia, United States

- Unincorporated community
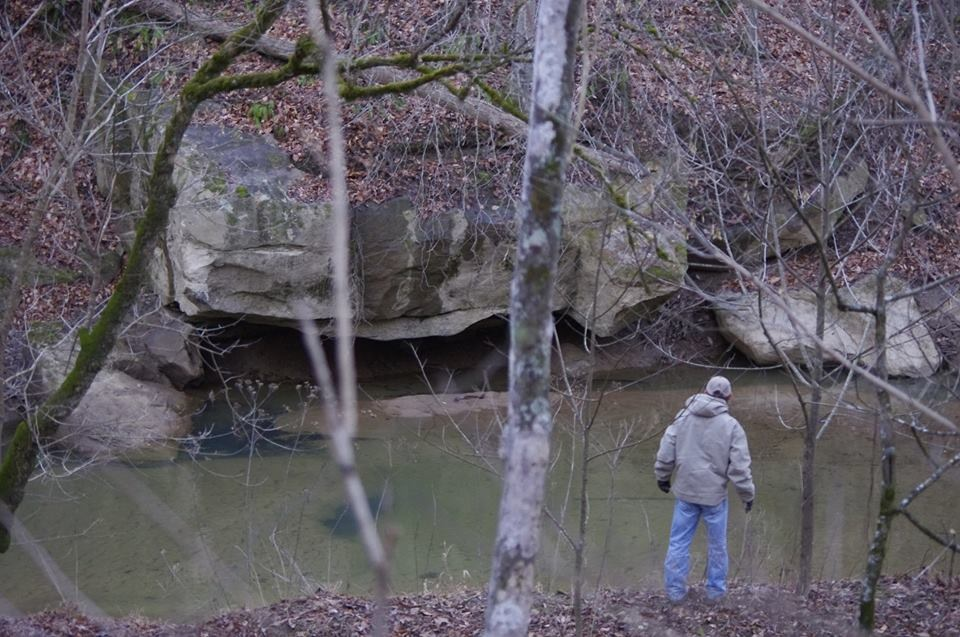
- Log boom at Gill, WV Brumfield log boom location, 2016

- Location within West Virginia Location within the United States
- Coordinates: 38°5′16″N 82°7′16″W
- Country: United States
- State: West Virginia
- County: Lincoln
- Elevation: 623 ft (190 m)
- Time zone: UTC-5 (Eastern (EST))
  - Summer (DST): UTC-4 (EDT)
- GNIS feature ID: 1549701

Gill is an unincorporated community and former railroad town in Lincoln County, West Virginia, United States.

== Geography ==
Gill is located between the mouth of Little Ugly Creek and Big Ugly Creek on the Guyandotte River in Lincoln County. Land situated across the river was once considered part of Gill. The community is located approximately five miles from Harts and 5.1 miles from Ranger.

== History ==
=== Captain Farley's Raid ===
Captain Henry Farley, a veteran of the Revolutionary War and resident of Montgomery County, Virginia, was the first known Anglo visitor to present-day Gill. In June 1792, Captain Farley passed through the area while pursuing a Native American war party that had raided Virginia settlements at Bluestone River. By the time he reached what is today Gill, he and his group had already engaged the retreating natives in the headwaters of Coal River and in the Guyandotte River valley some two miles below what is today Logan. Farley pursued the natives to the mouth of the Guyandotte River before returning home.

=== Pioneer settlers ===
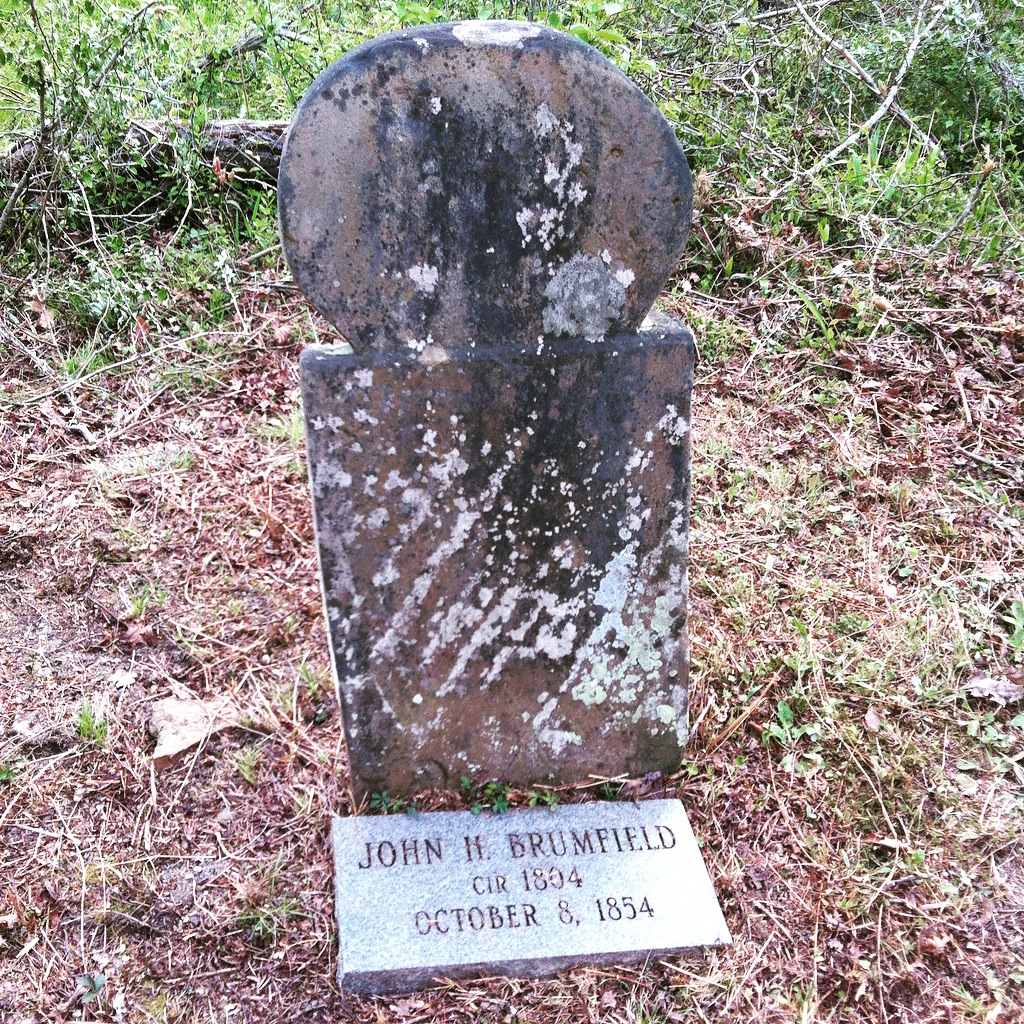
John H. Brumfield grave, 2016

William Wirt Brumfield first settled at the mouth of Big Ugly Creek, arriving about 1802 from the Big Stoney Creek section of what was then Montgomery County, Virginia but is now Giles County, Virginia. A War of 1812 soldier and gentleman justice of the County Court, he left the Ugly Creek section and settled at Buffalo Shoals in present-day Wayne County, West Virginia. His son, John H. Brumfield, populated the mouth of Ugly. Paris Brumfield, a son of John H. and a major character in the Lincoln County Feud, was born and raised in this vicinity. One noteworthy resident was Lewis "Jupiter" Fry, a well-known fiddler. Sampson S. Brumfield operated a log boom near the mouth of Ugly.

=== Formation of town ===
Gill Post Office was established on October 8, 1903. Thomas J. Gill, a timberman and store operator, served as the first postmaster. Later postmasters were Bradley W. Gill (son of Thomas) and Arabelle Gill (merchant mother of Brad). Notable residents in the early 1900s included members of the Cyfers family. At one time, the community boasted a hotel, railroad stop, church, school, and post office.

=== Decline ===
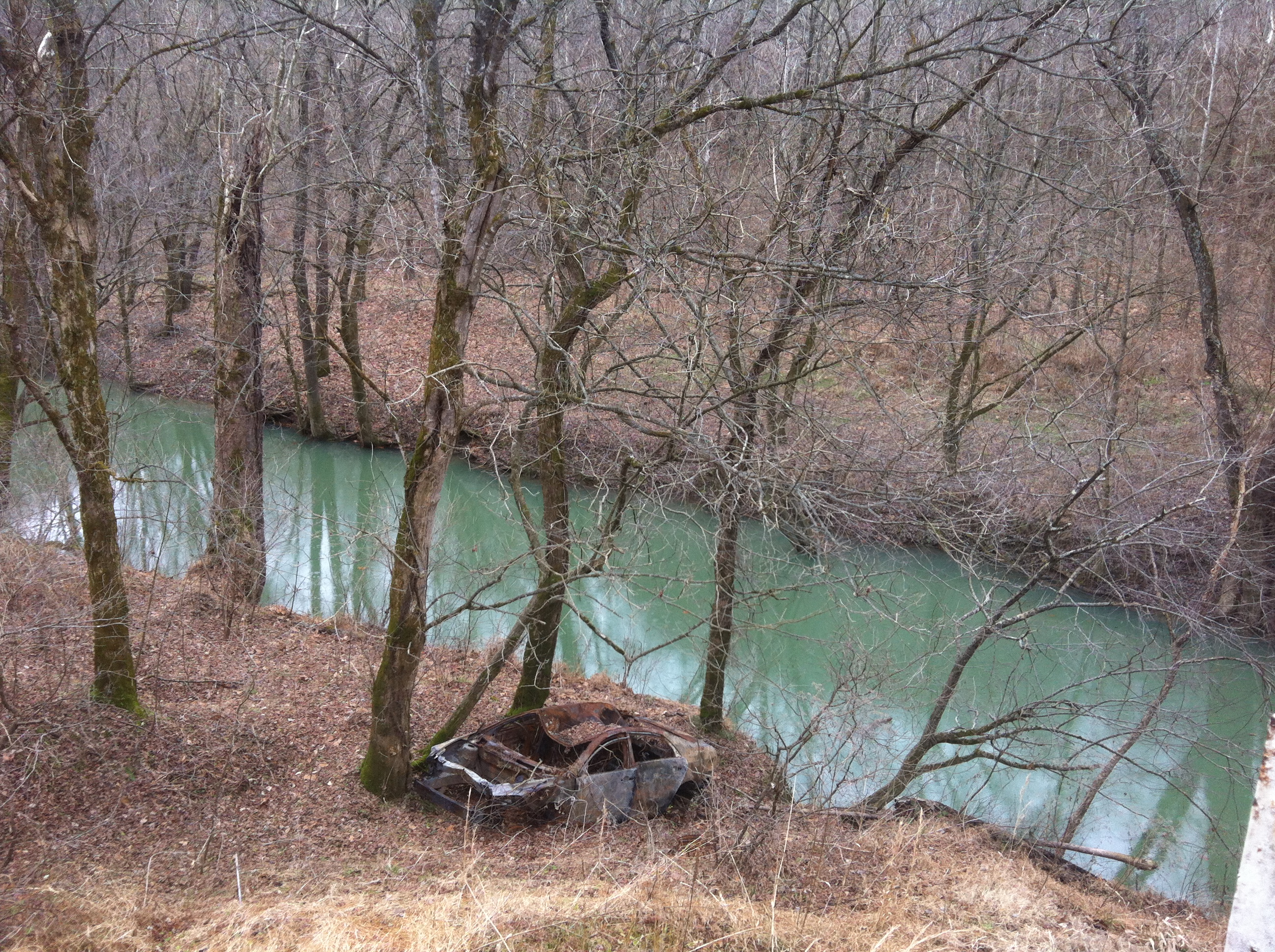
Gill, WV, 2016

Gill's prosperity was linked to its location at the mouth of Big Ugly Creek and its proximity to the Chesapeake and Ohio Railway. The construction of Route 10 on the opposite side of the Guyandotte River in the 1920s caused the demise of Gill.

== Economy ==
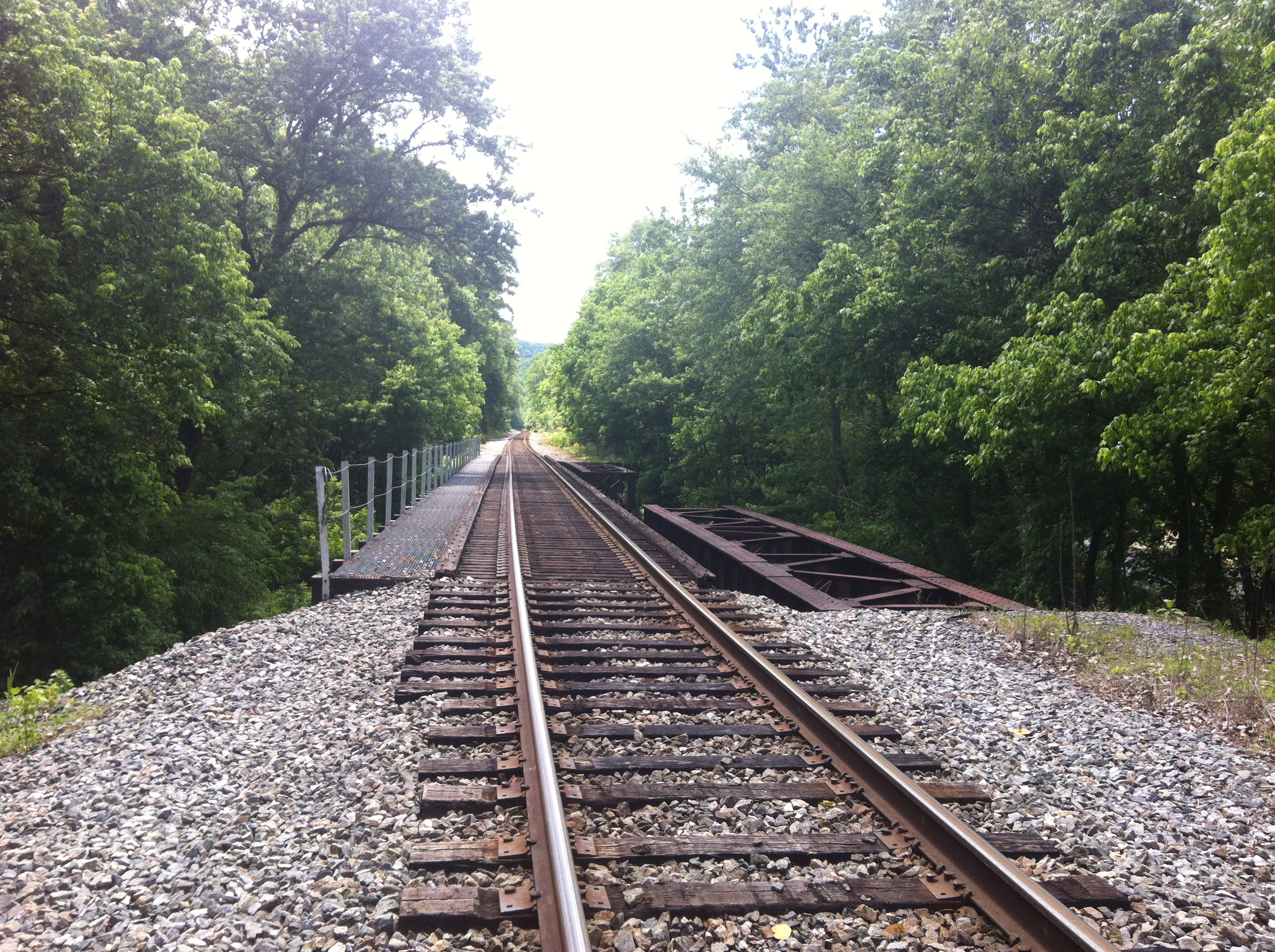
The CSX railroad track crosses the mouth of Big Ugly Creek at Gill, WV.

Timbering served as the primary industry. Gas is also important in the community's history. In the early 1900s, the Guyan, Big Ugly and Coal River Railway Company constructed a branch line up Big Ugly Creek from Gill.

== Notable residents ==
- Paris Brumfield (1837-1891), Confederate veteran and major figure in the Lincoln County Feud
- Sampson S. Brumfield (1847-c.1916), log boomer
- Lewis "Jupiter" Fry (1843-1924), Confederate veteran and fiddler
