= Sod, West Virginia =

- Unincorporated community
- Location within West Virginia Location within the United States
- Coordinates: 38°14′39″N 81°52′34″W
- Country: United States
- State: West Virginia
- County: Lincoln
- Time zone: UTC-5 (Eastern (EST))
  - Summer (DST): UTC-4 (EDT)
- ZIP codes: 25564

Sod (also Scioto) is an unincorporated community in northeastern Lincoln County, West Virginia, United States. It lies along West Virginia Route 214 east of the town of Hamlin, the county seat of Lincoln County. Sod's elevation is 781 feet (238 m). It has a post office with the ZIP code 25564.

Sod is a part of the Huntington-Ashland, WV-KY-OH, Metropolitan Statistical Area (MSA). As of the 2010 census, the MSA had a population of 287,702. New definitions from February 28, 2013 placed the population at 363,000.

Sod is located in Lincoln County, West Virginia. This country was established in 1867 four years after west Virginia became a state. Early European-American settlement begin in the late 18th century. Sod remain one of the smaller communities in the county..
