= Spurlockville, West Virginia =

- Unincorporated community
- Location within West Virginia Location within the United States
- Coordinates: 38°7′34″N 82°1′15″W
- Country: United States
- State: West Virginia
- County: Lincoln
- Time zone: UTC-5 (Eastern (EST))
  - Summer (DST): UTC-4 (EDT)
- ZIP codes: 25565

Spurlockville (also Spurlocksville) is an unincorporated community in central Lincoln County, West Virginia, United States. It lies south of the town of Hamlin, the county seat of Lincoln County. Its elevation is 758 feet (231 m). Spurlockville has a post office with the ZIP code 25565.
