= Woodville, West Virginia =

- Unincorporated community
- Location within West Virginia Location within the United States
- Coordinates: 38°09′41″N 81°53′31″W
- Country: United States
- State: West Virginia
- County: Lincoln
- Elevation: 679 ft (207 m)
- Time zone: UTC-5 (Eastern (EST))
  - Summer (DST): UTC-4 (EDT)
- ZIP code: 25572
- Area codes: 304 & 681
- GNIS feature ID: 1549388

Woodville is an unincorporated community in Lincoln County, West Virginia, United States. Woodville is 7.5 miles (12.1 km) north-northwest of Madison. Woodville had a post office, which closed on April 27, 1991.

The community was named after a tract of woods near the original town site.
