= Hubball, West Virginia =

Unincorporated community in West Virginia, US

Coordinates: 38°11′56″N 82°11′17″W

Hubball is an unincorporated community in Lincoln County, in the U.S. state of West Virginia.

== History ==
A post office called Hubball was established in 1911, and remained in operation until 1947. The community was named after one Mr. Hubball, a businessperson in the coal-mining industry.
