= Big Ugly Wildlife Management Area =

State Wildlife Management Area in Lincoln County, West Virginia

- IUCN category V (protected landscape/seascape)
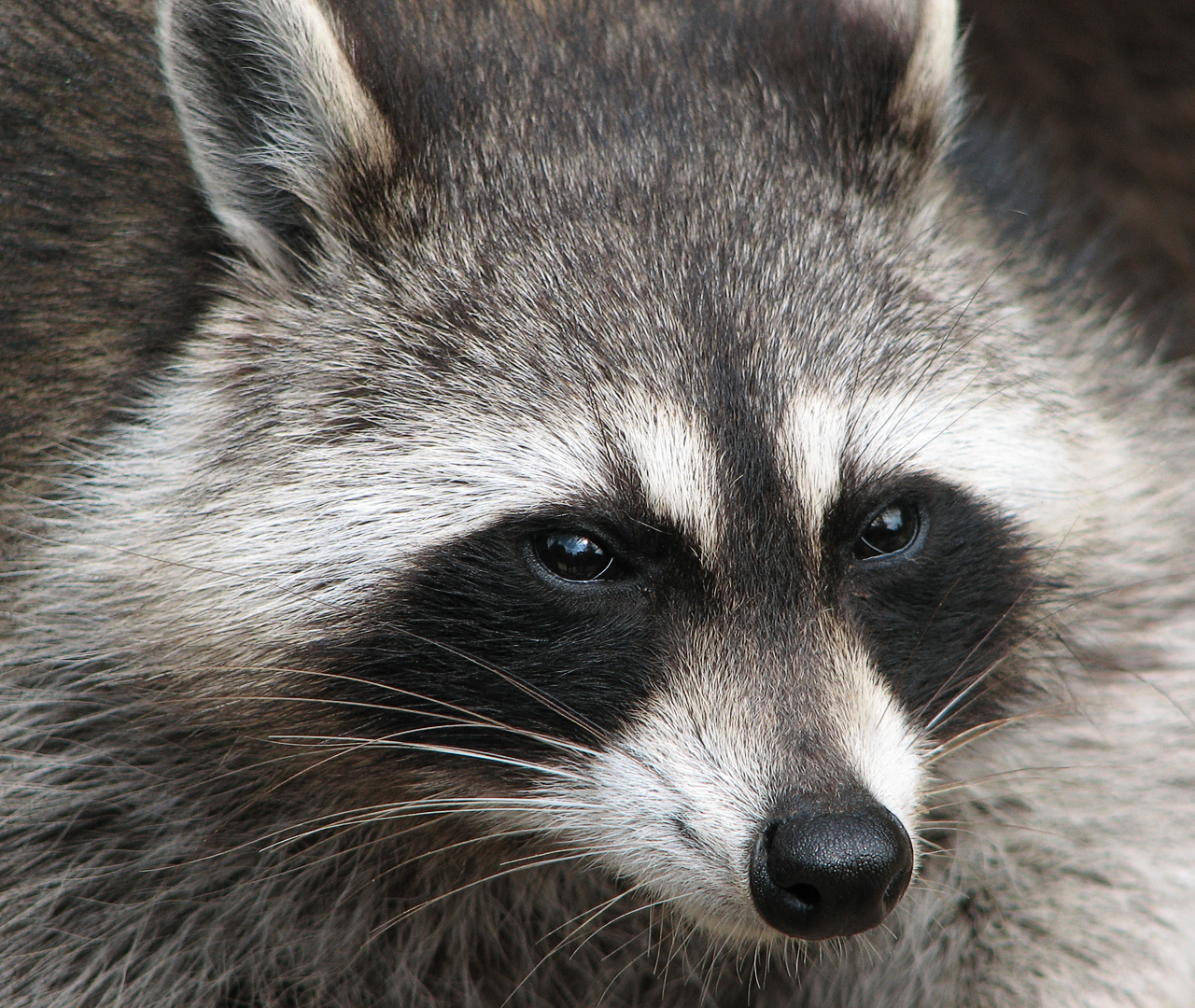
- Raccoon (Procyon lotor), is found in the Big Ugly WMA

- Location within West Virginia
- Location: Lincoln, West Virginia, United States
- Coordinates: 38°04′8″N 82°04′21″W
- Area: 6,000 acres (24 km^{2})
- Elevation: 620 ft (190 m)
- Operator: West Virginia Division of Natural Resources
- Website: WVDNR District 5 Wildlife Management Areas

Big Ugly Wildlife Management Area is located on 3,061 acres (1,239 ha) near Logan in Lincoln County, West Virginia. The Big Ugly's steep terrain is covered with mixed hardwoods second growth woodlands. Camping is not allowed at Big Ugly WMA, but is available at nearby Chief Logan State Park.

== Directions ==
From West Hamlin in Lincoln County, follow County Route 100 south to County Route 7. Turn north on County Route 7 (Greenshoal Road) to the community of Leet. At Leet, turn onto Laurel Fork Road and continue about 1 mile (1.6 km) to the Big Ugly WMA.

== Hunting ==
Hunting opportunities include deer, grouse, raccoon, squirrel, and turkey.

== See also ==
- Animal conservation
- Hunting
- List of West Virginia wildlife management areas
- Recreational fishing
