= Bernie, West Virginia =

- Unincorporated community
- Location within West Virginia Location within the United States
- Coordinates: 38°10′49.3″N 82°00′42.5″W
- Country: United States
- State: West Virginia
- County: Lincoln
- Elevation: 833 ft (254 m)
- Time zone: UTC-5 (Eastern (EST))
  - Summer (DST): UTC-4 (EDT)
- GNIS feature ID: 1741591

Bernie was an unincorporated community in Lincoln County, West Virginia, United States. It is situate along Parsner Creek West Virginia on Lincoln County Route 40/1. It is approximately 8.5 air miles southeast of the town of Hamlin, the county seat of Lincoln County. It's elevation is 833 feet (254 m). It had a post office that was approved June 12, 1893 but then closed on January 8, 1962; there were five Post Masters: 1.)Mr. S. A. Egnor, 2.)Mr. Alamander Elkins, 3.)Mrs. Hazel Whitten, 4.)Mrs. Eva Linville, 5.)Mrs. Bethel Bragg and the USGS maps of that era show Bernie on West Virginia, Lincoln County, Hager Quad at Location DD: 38.180373, -82.0117982. The first post office was originally proposed to be named "Pin Hook", but was changed to the unincorporated community name of Bernie with an estimated population of 200 according to the initial post office application and was located on the property of S.A. Egnor, and was later moved approximately 1,800 feet to the property of Alamander Elkins, because he had free gas for heat, on June 16, 1897, and was operated at that location until it was closed in 1962. After closing the mail for Bernie was rerouted through multiple post offices but the majority went to Griffithsville, West Virginia with the remaining through Alkol, West Virginia.
