= Fry, West Virginia =

Unincorporated community in West Virginia, United States

- Unincorporated community
- Location within West Virginia Location within the United States
- Coordinates: 38°00′54″N 82°4′59″W
- Country: United States
- State: West Virginia
- County: Lincoln
- Elevation: 627 ft (191 m)
- Time zone: UTC-5 (Eastern (EST))
  - Summer (DST): UTC-4 (EDT)
- GNIS feature ID: 1554517

Fry is an unincorporated community in Lincoln County, West Virginia, United States. Its first recorded appearance was in state business directories in 1908.
