= Sweetland, West Virginia =

- Unincorporated community
- Location within West Virginia Location within the United States
- Coordinates: 38°15′34″N 82°02′31″W
- Country: United States
- State: West Virginia
- County: Lincoln
- Elevation: 643 ft (196 m)
- Time zone: UTC-5 (Eastern (EST))
  - Summer (DST): UTC-4 (EDT)
- Area codes: 304 & 681
- GNIS feature ID: 1549948

Sweetland is an unincorporated community in Lincoln County, West Virginia, United States. Sweetland is located on West Virginia Route 3 and the Middle Fork Mud River, 3.5 miles (5.6 km) east-southeast of Hamlin. Sweetland had a post office, which closed on December 14, 1996.

The community was named after one Mr. Van Sweetland.
