= J. S. Pridemore =

American politician

Member of the West Virginia House of Delegates
- In office 1934–1940

Personal details
- Born: 1871 Hamlin, West Virginia
- Died: Unknown

John Samuel Pridemore (born 1871 in Hamlin, West Virginia) was a West Virginian oil industrialist, real estate developer, and politician.

== Political career ==
J.S. Pridemore was elected Sheriff of Lincoln County, West Virginia in 1907 and championed the fight against bootlegging, at the time prevalent throughout the region. Pridemore was chair of the Republican Party in oil-rich Lincoln county for over thirty years. In 1934, Pridemore was elected to the West Virginia House of Delegates. Pridemore was re-elected twice, but did not seek re-election after a failed Congressional bid in 1940.

== Pridemore Oil Company ==
The formation of Pridemore Oil was the result of the acquisition of mineral rights from farmers throughout West Virginia starting in 1905. When oil and gas were discovered in Lincoln County, Pridemore found himself in control of the second-largest fossil fuel conglomerate in oil-rich West Virginia. Pridemore amassed a considerable fortune diversified in oil, real estate, and a family-owned bank. This diversification left Pridemore mostly unaffected by the economic climate of the depression, making him a major player in West Virginia politics. Through the nineteen-thirties and forties Pridemore continued to develop his oil holdings, purchasing oil fields in Pennsylvania, Ohio, West Virginia, Tennessee and Kentucky. These holdings were consolidated into The Pridemore Oil Company, portions of which were later acquired by Standard Oil and McJunkin, (now MRC Global), though some are still privately held by Pridemore's descendants. It was at one time believed that Pridemore was involved in Teapot Dome due to business dealings with Sinclair Oil Corporation, but was cleared of any connection during congressional hearings.
