= Pea Ridge, West Virginia =

- Census-designated place
- Location in Cabell County, West Virginia

- Location within West Virginia Location within the United States
- Coordinates: 38°24′56″N 82°19′17″W
- Country: United States
- State: West Virginia
- County: Cabell

Area
  - Total: 2.4 sq mi (6.1 km^{2})
  - Land: 2.3 sq mi (5.9 km^{2})
  - Water: 0.039 sq mi (0.1 km^{2})
- Elevation: 627 ft (191 m)

Population (2010)
  - Total: 6,650
  - Density: 2,900/sq mi (1,100/km^{2})
- Time zone: UTC-5 (Eastern (EST))
  - Summer (DST): UTC-4 (EDT)
- Area code: 304
- FIPS code: 54-62488
- GNIS feature ID: 1867650

Pea Ridge is a census-designated place in Cabell County, West Virginia, United States. As of the 2020 census, the population was 6,602. It is part of the Huntington–Ashland metropolitan area.

== Geography ==
Pea Ridge is located at 38°24′56″N 82°19′17″W (38.415668, -82.321367). It is a suburban community to nearby Huntington, West Virginia. It is centered on Pea Ridge Road, running from Barboursville to Altizer, a neighborhood in Huntington. Pea Ridge Road is divided into east and west sections, separated by a short section of Route 60.

According to the United States Census Bureau, the CDP has a total area of 2.3 square miles (6.1 km^{2}), of which 2.3 square miles (5.9 km^{2}) is land and 0.1 square mile (0.1 km^{2}) (2.41%) is water.

== Demographics ==
Historical population
Census	Pop.	Note	%±
2000	6,363		—
2010	6,650		4.5%
2020	6,602		−0.7%
U.S. Decennial Census

=== 2020 census ===
As of the 2020 census, Pea Ridge had a population of 6,602. The median age was 41.4 years. 19.7% of residents were under the age of 18 and 21.8% of residents were 65 years of age or older. For every 100 females there were 88.4 males, and for every 100 females age 18 and over there were 84.1 males age 18 and over.

100.0% of residents lived in urban areas, while 0.0% lived in rural areas.

There were 3,074 households in Pea Ridge, of which 24.5% had children under the age of 18 living in them. Of all households, 42.4% were married-couple households, 18.2% were households with a male householder and no spouse or partner present, and 32.3% were households with a female householder and no spouse or partner present. About 35.9% of all households were made up of individuals and 14.9% had someone living alone who was 65 years of age or older.

There were 3,309 housing units, of which 7.1% were vacant. The homeowner vacancy rate was 1.7% and the rental vacancy rate was 10.0%.

Racial composition as of the 2020 census
Race	Number	Percent
White	5,867	88.9%
Black or African American	166	2.5%
American Indian and Alaska Native	8	0.1%
Asian	205	3.1%
Native Hawaiian and Other Pacific Islander	0	0.0%
Some other race	47	0.7%
Two or more races	309	4.7%
Hispanic or Latino (of any race)	132	2.0%

=== 2000 census ===
As of the census of 2000, there were 6,363 people, 2,814 households, and 1,820 families residing in the CDP. The population density was 2,756.2 people per square mile (1,063.5/km^{2}). There were 3,046 housing units at an average density of 1,319.4/sq mi (509.1/km^{2}). The racial makeup of the CDP was 94.58% White, 1.62% African American, 0.24% Native American, 2.58% Asian, 0.02% Pacific Islander, 0.06% from other races, and 0.91% from two or more races. Hispanic or Latino of any race were 0.42% of the population.

There were 2,814 households, out of which 23.4% had children under the age of 18 living with them, 54.9% were married couples living together, 8.2% had a female householder with no husband present, and 35.3% were non-families. 30.0% of all households were made up of individuals, and 11.1% had someone living alone who was 65 years of age or older. The average household size was 2.25 and the average family size was 2.80.

In the CDP the population was spread out, with 19.4% under the age of 18, 9.1% from 18 to 24, 28.5% from 25 to 44, 25.2% from 45 to 64, and 17.8% who were 65 years of age or older. The median age was 41 years. For every 100 females, there were 89.6 males. For every 100 females age 18 and over, there were 86.5 males.

The median income for a household in the CDP was $41,739, and the median income for a family was $55,294. Males had a median income of $41,192 versus $26,090 for females. The per capita income for the CDP was $23,904. About 3.8% of families and 6.2% of the population were below the poverty line, including 5.2% of those under age 18 and 3.5% of those age 65 or over.
