= Lincoln County Schools (West Virginia) =

School district in West Virginia, United States

Location
- Lincoln County, West Virginia

District information
- Type: Public
- Motto: Preparing today’s learners to be tomorrow’s leaders.
- Superintendent: Frank Barnett
- NCES District ID: 5400660

Other information
- Website: www.lcsdwv.com

Lincoln County Schools is the operating school district within Lincoln County, West Virginia.

== Schools ==
The following schools are in Lincoln County Schools:

=== High schools ===
- Lincoln County High School

=== PK-8 schools ===
- Duval PK-8
- Hamlin PK-8
- Harts PK-8

=== Middle schools ===
- Guyan Valley Middle

=== Elementary schools ===
- Midway Elementary School (set to be consolidated with Duval PK-8)
- Ranger Elementary
- West Hamlin Elementary
