= Alkol, West Virginia =

Unincorporated community in West Virginia, United States

- Unincorporated community
- Location within West Virginia Location within the United States
- Coordinates: 38°9′46″N 81°55′29″W
- Country: United States
- State: West Virginia
- County: Lincoln
- Time zone: UTC-5 (Eastern (EST))
  - Summer (DST): UTC-4 (EDT)
- ZIP codes: 25501

Alkol is an unincorporated community in eastern Lincoln County, West Virginia, United States. It lies along West Virginia Route 3, southeast of the town of Hamlin, the county seat of Lincoln County. Its elevation is 748 feet (228 m). Although it is unincorporated, it has a post office (established in 1916) with the ZIP code 25501.

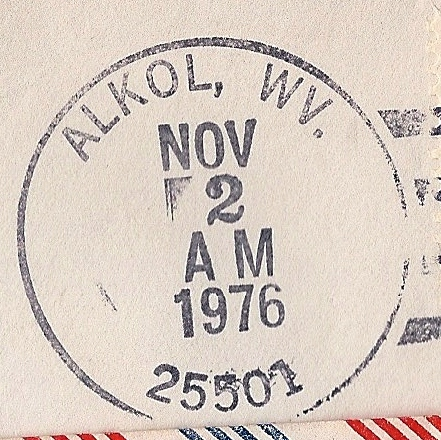
