= Ferrellsburg, West Virginia =

Unincorporated community in West Virginia, United States

- Unincorporated community
- Location within West Virginia Location within the United States
- Coordinates: 38°01′30″N 82°06′19″W
- Country: United States
- State: West Virginia
- County: Lincoln
- Post Office: December 27, 1904
- Elevation: 636 ft (194 m)
- Time zone: UTC-5 (Eastern (EST))
  - Summer (DST): UTC-4 (EDT)
- Postal code: 25513
- Area codes: 304 & 681
- GNIS feature ID: 1538940

Ferrellsburg is an unincorporated community in southern Lincoln County, West Virginia, United States. It is located in Harts Creek District and is part of the Harts census-designated place.

== Geography ==
Ferrellsburg is situated along the Guyandotte River. Its primary streams are Fowler Branch, Walker Branch, Douglas Branch, and Swift Shoals Branch.

== History ==
=== Captain Farley's Raid ===
Captain Henry Farley, a veteran of the Revolutionary War and resident of Montgomery County, Virginia, was the first known Anglo visitor to present-day Ferrellsburg. In June 1792, Captain Farley passed through the area while pursuing a Native American war party that had raided Virginia settlements at Bluestone River. By the time he reached what is known today as Ferrellsburg, he and his group had already engaged the retreating natives in the headwaters of Coal River and in the Guyandotte River valley some two miles below what is today Logan. Farley pursued the natives to the mouth of the Guyandotte River before returning home.

=== Adkins Plantation ===
Elias Adkins constitutes the first known settler of present-day Ferrellsburg, then known as Adkins Branch. In the 1820s, Elias and his family located at the mouth of Adkins Branch (later renamed Fowler Branch) from present-day Wayne County, West Virginia. Elias lived in a large two-story hewn log home located a short distance up Adkins Branch, located at the approximate location of the present-day CSX Railroad tracks. The Adkinses owned a small number of slaves. According to family tradition, the Adkins slaves lived in one-room plank dwellings situated near the Guyandotte River at the approximate location of the Bruce Thompson barn-Pat Kirk residence. In 1873, Hezekiah "Carr" Adkins, youngest son of Elias, acquired the bulk of the family property. Elias Adkins appears to have died about 1877. In the early 1880s, Jackson and Rachel Spurlock commenced a civil suit against Elias Adkins' estate regarding a debt. About 1881, the Lincoln County Court placed the Adkins property in the hands of a J.E. Chilton, commissioner. In 1882, John P. Fowler, son-in-law of Elias, acquired 150 acres of the Elias Adkins farm previously owned by Hezekiah Adkins. The following year, he deed it to his wife, Lettie Belle, who maintained ownership until 1918. During this time, Adkins Branch was renamed Fowler Branch. In 1883, Paris Brumfield acquired the Elias Adkins homestead, 75 acres of property previously owned by Hezekiah Adkins. Deed records refer to this tract as the "Hezekiah Adkins farm." In 1890, Brumfield deeded it to his daughter Martha Roberts, the wife of a merchant. Beginning in 1891, the Roberts property sported a building valued at $100. In 1894, Martha sold it to Lettie Belle Fowler, who joined it with her 150 acres. In 1895, John Q. and Maggie Adams acquired the 75-acre tract.

=== G.W. Ferrell & Company ===
In 1896 and 1897, Keenan and Arena Ferrell bought the Adkins home place from John Q. Adams, as well as 119 adjacent acres from Jacob K. Adkins. The Ferrells occupied a two-story log home and operated a general store, which they named G.W. Ferrell & Company in tribute to their adopted son, George W. Ferrell. Ferrell was active in his family's store business. In a 1902–03 business directory, he was listed as its proprietor. Postmaster at nearby Green Shoal from 1902 until 1904, Ferrell was also a composer and musician. He is credited with the authorship of “The Lincoln County Crew,” which tells the story of the Lincoln County Feud, and “The Murder of John Brumfield,” as well as a song about someone named Harve Adkins. The Ferrells also raised Lula Vance, a local orphan who they later disinherited due to their disfavor of her choice in a spouse.

In September 1904, the first train passed through Ferrellsburg, the C&O line between Huntington and Logan having been completed.

Ferrellsburg was established on December 27, 1904, by George W. Ferrell, who served as the community's postmaster until January 23, 1906, illness forced him to retire. Arena Ferrell replaced the young man as postmaster. In August 1906, George W. died of tuberculosis. Wilburn Sanders, nephew to Arena Ferrell, served as postmaster from 1906 until 1909. In 1906, Ferrellsburg had a population of 200 people and had a telephone connection at the Ferrell store. Fisher B. Adkins, a popular schoolteacher, was postmaster at Ferrellsburg from 1909 until 1914.

During this period, perhaps prompted by George W. Ferrell's untimely death, Keenan and Arena Ferrell began to buy property in Huntington and devote less time to their business at Ferrellsburg. In 1910, Arena Ferrell bought property on 7th Avenue in Huntington. At that same time, Dike Kenner Altizer, reputed paramour to Arena Ferrell, maintained residence with the Ferrells at their Lincoln County home, serving as a "hired man." In 1910, Arena constructed her last will and testament, which granted to Altizer all of her personal property, money, and residence on 7th Avenue. Keenan Ferrell, husband to Arena, would receive the farm at Ferrellsburg, which would, upon his death, pass to Altizer.

G.W. Ferrell & Company remained listed in state business directories until 1913. In July of that year, D.K. Altizer relocated his saw mill from Green Shoal to Abbotts Branch. A few weeks later, the Ferrells sold out their store property to Hansford Adkins, a merchant at Ranger, and moved to Green Shoal, where Arena Ferrell briefly owned a hotel. The Ferrells soon relocated to Cabell County, where Keenan died in 1930 and Arena died in 1938. Shortly before her death, Arena deeded her Cabell County property to Altizer.

=== Walt Stowers ===
In 1908, Joseph Walt Stowers (1876–1934) purchased a one-acre tract of land jointly with F.E. "Ene" Adkins from the Ferrells. A store was included in the property. He and Adkins opened a store business under the name of Stowers & Adkins. In 1909, Adkins deeded his half-interest to Fisher B. Adkins, who deeded it back to Ene's wife later that year. By 1910, Stowers & Adkins operated a bustling business in the community. According to newspaper accounts of the time, Stowers was president of the stockholders in the Burns Chair Factory and considered attending medical school in Louisville. In 1914, the year of his marriage to the former Georgia Adkins, he became sole proprietor of Stowers & Adkins, buying out the half-interest of his partner for $1200 with a promise of $800 more within the year. On February 18, 1914, he became postmaster at Ferrellsburg. In 1918, Stowers purchased 147 3/4 acres of Lettie Belle Fowler's 150 acres. In 1922, Stowers secured three tracts of land totaling 39 acres from Dan Nelson. During his lifetime, Walt Stowers was the chief businessman in Ferrellsburg. He was also the longest serving postmaster, giving up the position with his death on February 10, 1934. Thereafter, his widow Georgia served as postmistress until January 12, 1938.

=== Hansford Adkins & Sons ===
By November 1913, Hansford Adkins, who had recently acquired the 190-acre Ferrell property and store, erected a new home and operated a business called "Hansford Adkins & Sons." That same year, he transferred the property and one-half interest in his store to General and Ira J. Adkins, retaining ownership of a calf and one-half interest in the business until his death. The Adkins brothers operated a store at the location until 1920, when they bestowed the property to Dr. Robert R. Vaughan, a nonresident company doctor in the Logan County coalfields. Dr. Vaughn briefly bestowed the property to Martha Fowler before it was placed in the hands of Jacob D. Smith, trustee. In 1924, Smith returned the property to Dr. Vaughn. During this time when the property quickly changed hands several times, P.B. "Fed" Adkins briefly operated the old Hansford Adkins store.

=== F.E. Adkins Murder ===
On March 8, 1918, F.E. Adkins, merchant at Harts, along with Coon Tomblin, met Walter Farris at the Ferrellsburg train stop near the Stowers store. At the time, Farris, a resident of Piney Fork, was relocating to the Logan County coalfields. An altercation arose between Farris and Adkins. Adkins reportedly urinated in Farris' lard bucket and also shot into some of his furniture. Later that evening, as Adkins returned through Ferrellsburg to Harts, Farris shot him from the Stowers' yard. Adkins fell face-first onto a tie pile, breaking his nose. His body lay there throughout the night until a local justice of the peace could convene a coroner's jury. Tomblin was also shot in the incident, but did not immediately die. Walter Farris was pardoned by the governor, John J. Cornwell, in April, 1919, due to extenuating circumstances of the case.

=== Isaac "Ike" Dean Murder ===
On April 23, 1921, Albert "Ab" Messer murdered Isaac "Ike" Dean on the porch of Emery Mullins' house in the upper section of Douglas Branch. Dean was the brother-in-law to prominent storekeepers, Walt and Georgia Stowers, and the father of four children. Jealousy involving Emery Mullins' daughter reportedly partly caused the murder. Messer was the father of four children.

=== Doc Vaughn ===
In the early 1920s, Dr. Robert R. Vaughn partitioned much of Ferrellsburg into lots, naming Main Street, Railroad Avenue, and Short Street. He did not partition the original two-acre Elias Adkins home place/Ferrell store property/Hansford Adkins store property. In 1924, he sold the two-acre tract to J.C. Ramsey, who in turn sold it to Levi Gore, who in turn sold it to Elmer Gore...all within a year. In 1927, Elmer Gore sold the two acres, including Lot 18, to Walt Stowers.

=== Elmer Evans ===
Following Walt Stowers' death in 1934, his widow Georgia ceased operation of their store and began to sell their property. In 1937, William Isaacs and Roscoe M. Adkins, two realtors in Huntington, acquired 225 acres. This acreage included the Stowers store. Isaacs became postmaster on January 12, 1938, a position he held until April 1, 1938. That same year, Georgia Stowers rebought most of the property from Isaacs, then almost immediately sold it to Ola Adkins. During this time, Elmer Evans gained the Ferrellsburg post office. Evans, a general store operator, became postmaster on November 28, 1938. By 1939, Georgia Stowers had relocated to Huntington, having sold some of her remaining property to sister Kizzie Dean. Ola Adkins sold the old Stowers store and the surrounding 191-acre tract to Ida Mullins, who briefly operated a store business.

== Government ==
Ferrellsburg is home to the Harts Senior Citizens Center. For several years, the community also served as the location of the Harts Veterans and Community Center.

== Education ==
Beginning in the 1890s, the Walker School situated at Low Gap in the head of Walker Branch served the educational needs of local residents. The school remained active through the early decades of the twentieth century. In 1926–1927, Enos Dial taught at Walker School, which had an enrollment of 15 students.

In 1927, merchant Walt Stowers sold one acre of land to the Harts Creek District Board of Education for $850. According to the deed, Stowers agreed to remove a log barn located near the premises, while the board promised to build a fence around their acre. This land transaction resulted in the establishment of Ferrellsburg School. The original school was a plank building painted gray. For most of its existence, the school operated as an elementary school, grades 1–8. In the 1950s, the original wooden school structure was replaced with a brick structure. The Ferrellsburg Eagles were noted for producing talented basketball teams. The school closed in the early 2000s.

== Churches ==
The Low Gap United Baptist Church, established in 1898, originally served the Ferrellsburg community and the lower region of Harts Creek. The Low Gap UB church, which during the 1910s left the Baptist fold and joined the General Assembly before returning to its United Baptist roots, remained active until the 1940s. In contemporary times, two churches, the Ferrellsburg Church of Christ and the Ferrellsburg Church of God, have served the religious needs of the community.

== Transportation ==
Ferrellsburg is accessed by Route 10. CSX Railroad bisects the community.

== Business ==
In 1928, Walt Stowers granted Chesapeake & Potomac Telephone Company the right to construct telephone pole and wires and fixtures on all of their property holdings.

Kirk's Grocery, the longest-running and last-surviving general store in Harts Creek District, is located in Ferrellsburg. The business was originally established by Elmer Evans in the late 1930s.

In 1939, Georgia Stowers signed a deed of easement with Appalachian Electric Company.
