= Russ Thomas =

American football player, coach, and executive (1924–1991)

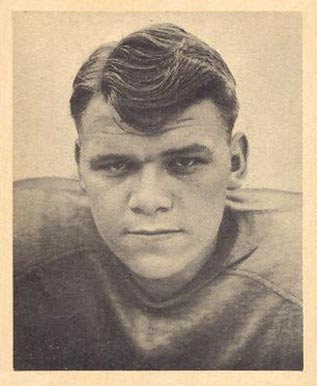
- Thomas on a 1948 Bowman football card

No. 71
- Position: Tackle

Personal information
- Born: July 24, 1924; Griffithsville, West Virginia, U.S.
- Died: March 19, 1991 (aged 66); Naples, Florida, U.S.
- Listed height: 6 ft 3 in (1.91 m)
- Listed weight: 237 lb (108 kg)

Career information
- High school: Charleston (Charleston, West Virginia)
- College: Ohio State (1943–1945)
- NFL draft: 1946: 3rd round, 22nd overall pick

Career history

Playing
- Detroit Lions (1946–1949)

Coaching
- Detroit Lions (1952–1953) Assistant coach

Operations
- Detroit Lions (1964–1966) Director of player personnel; Detroit Lions (1967–1989) General manager

Awards and highlights
- 2× NFL champion (1952, 1953); Second-team All-Pro (1947); First-team All-Big Ten (1945)

Career NFL statistics
- Games played: 44
- Games started: 27
- Fumble recoveries: 2
- Stats at Pro Football Reference

John Russell Thomas (July 24, 1924 – March 19, 1991) was an American professional football tackle who played four seasons with the Detroit Lions of the National Football League (NFL). He was selected by the Lions in the third round of the 1946 NFL draft and again in the 2nd round of the 1947 NFL draft after playing college football at Ohio State University. Thomas was the general manager of the Lions from 1967 to 1989.

== Early life and college ==
John Russell Thomas was born on July 24, 1924, in Griffithsville, West Virginia. He attended Charleston High School in Charleston, West Virginia.

Thomas was a three-year letterman for the Ohio State Buckeyes of Ohio State University from 1943 to 1945. He was named first-team All-Big Ten by both the Associated Press and United Press in 1945.

== Professional career ==
Thomas was selected by the Detroit Lions in the third round, with the 22nd overall pick, of the 1946 NFL draft. He signed a one-year contract with the Lions. He played in all 11 games, starting one, for the Lions during his rookie year in 1946 as the team went 1–10. The Saginaw News reported that Thomas would also be required to enter the 1947 NFL draft since his college class did not graduate until June 1947. He was selected by the Lions in the second round, with the 12th overall pick, of the 1947 draft. He started all 12 games in 1947 as the Lions finished 3–9. Thomas was named a second-team All-Pro by Pro Football Illustrated for his performance during the 1947 season. He appeared in 12 games, starting five, in 1948 and recovered one fumble. He played in nine games, starting one, during the 1949 season. His playing career ended in 1949 after he suffered a knee injury.

== Post-playing career ==
Thomas was an assistant coach on the Detroit Lions' 1952 and 1953 NFL Championship teams. After a stint as a broadcaster, Thomas became the team's director of player personnel. He served as the general manager of the Lions from 1967 until his retirement in 1989. He was unpopular with Lions fans for his tough stance at the negotiating table and the scapegoat for the team's mediocrity during his tenure. He died in his sleep on March 19, 1991. The Lions players wore a silver football shaped patch on the left chest of their jerseys with the initials 'JRT' in his memory during the 1991 season.
