= Culloden, West Virginia =

- Census-designated place
- Location in Cabell County, West Virginia

- Location within West Virginia Location within the United States
- Coordinates: 38°25′6″N 82°4′4″W
- Country: United States
- State: West Virginia
- Counties: Cabell, Putnam

Area
  - Total: 4.2 sq mi (10.9 km^{2})
  - Land: 4.2 sq mi (10.9 km^{2})
  - Water: 0 sq mi (0.0 km^{2})
- Elevation: 705 ft (215 m)

Population (2020)
  - Total: 3,016
  - Density: 717/sq mi (277/km^{2})
- Time zone: UTC-5 (Eastern (EST))
  - Summer (DST): UTC-4 (EDT)
- ZIP code: 25510
- Area code: 304
- FIPS code: 54-19516
- GNIS feature ID: 1554240

Culloden is a census-designated place in Cabell and Putnam counties in the U.S. state of West Virginia. As of the 2020 census, the population was 3,016. It is part of the Huntington–Ashland metropolitan area.

The community's name was selected on account of its perceived uniqueness.

== Geography ==
Culloden is located at 38°25′6″N 82°4′4″W (38.418238, -82.067883).

According to the United States Census Bureau, the Culloden CDP has a total area of 4.2 square miles (10.9 km^{2}), of which 4.2 square miles (10.9 km^{2}) is land and 0.38% is water.

== Demographics ==
Historical population
Census	Pop.	Note	%±
2000	2,940		—
2010	3,061		4.1%
2020	3,016		−1.5%
U.S. Decennial Census

As of the census of 2000, there were 2,940 people, 1,177 households, and 894 families residing in the community. The population density was 796.8 people per square mile (307.6/km^{2}). There were 1,249 housing units at an average density of 338.5/sq mi (130.7/km^{2}). The racial makeup of the community was 98.84% White, 0.31% African American, 0.10% Native American, 0.27% Asian, 0.03% from other races, and 0.44% from two or more races. Hispanic or Latino of any race were 0.24% of the population.

There were 1,177 households, out of which 32.6% had children under the age of 18 living with them, 62.8% were married couples living together, 10.6% had a female householder with no husband present, and 24.0% were non-families. 21.0% of all households were made up of individuals, and 10.5% had someone living alone who was 65 years of age or older. The average household size was 2.49 and the average family size was 2.87.

The age distribution is 22.3% under the age of 18, 8.8% from 18 to 24, 28.4% from 25 to 44, 26.5% from 45 to 64, and 14.0% who were 65 years of age or older. The median age was 38 years. For every 100 females there were 91.2 males. For every 100 females age 18 and over, there were 85.8 males.

The median income for a household in the community was $39,135, and the median income for a family was $42,365. Males had a median income of $35,625 versus $21,050 for females. The per capita income for the community was $18,904. About 5.3% of families and 8.0% of the population were below the poverty line, including 19.9% of those under age 18 and 6.6% of those age 65 or over.
