= Homer Heck =

American businessman and politician

- Born: September 29, 1936; Branchland, West Virginia
- Died: November 10, 2014 (aged 78); Huntington, West Virginia
- Education: Marshall University; Texas Western University; Alexander Hamilton Institute

Homer Heck was an American businessman and politician.

== Early life ==
Heck was born on September 29th, 1936 in Branchland, West Virginia to George Earl and Carrie Midkiff Heck. In 1955, he graduated from Huntington High School and served in the United States Army. He then went to Marshall University and Texas Western University and received a degree from Alexander Hamilton Institute.

== Career ==
Heck worked at Armco Steel, INCO Nickel Plant, in Huntington, West Virginia, and owned several businesses. He served in the West Virginia State Senate from 1980 to 1984 and then from 1988 to 1992 as a Democrat.

== Death ==
Heck retired and died in Huntington, West Virginia, on November 11th, 2014.
