= Midkiff, West Virginia =

- Unincorporated community
- Location within West Virginia Location within the United States
- Coordinates: 38°10′34″N 82°10′44″W
- Country: United States
- State: West Virginia
- County: Lincoln
- Time zone: UTC-5 (Eastern (EST))
  - Summer (DST): UTC-4 (EDT)
- ZIP codes: 25540

Midkiff is an unincorporated community in western Lincoln County, West Virginia, United States. It lies along West Virginia Route 10 southwest of the town of Hamlin, the county seat of Lincoln County. Its elevation is 597 feet (182 m). It has a post office with the ZIP code 25540.

The community was named after a local Midkiff family.

== Notable person ==
Jack Fellure, a perennial candidate for President of the United States, was born at Midkiff.
