= Pleasant View, Lincoln County, West Virginia =

Pleasant View, West Virginia
- Unincorporated community
- Location within West Virginia Location within the United States
- Coordinates: 38°14′58″N 82°11′26″W
- Country: United States
- State: West Virginia
- County: Lincoln
- Elevation: 591 ft (180 m)
- Time zone: UTC-5 (Eastern (EST))
  - Summer (DST): UTC-4 (EDT)
- Area codes: 304 & 681
- GNIS feature ID: 1555373

Pleasant View is an unincorporated community in Lincoln County, West Virginia, United States. Pleasant View is located on the Guyandotte River and West Virginia Route 10, 2.5 miles (4.0 km) south of West Hamlin.
