= Fourteen, West Virginia =

Unincorporated community in West Virginia, United States

- Unincorporated community
- Location within West Virginia Location within the United States
- Coordinates: 38°4′00″N 82°11′21″W
- Country: United States
- State: West Virginia
- County: Lincoln
- Elevation: 735 ft (224 m)
- Time zone: UTC-5 (Eastern (EST))
  - Summer (DST): UTC-4 (EDT)
- GNIS feature ID: 1741620

Fourteen was an unincorporated community in Lincoln County, West Virginia, United States. Its post office was organized on January 10, 1877.

The origin of the name "Fourteen" is obscure.
