= West Hamlin, West Virginia =

- Town
- Motto: Always Free
- Location of West Hamlin in Lincoln County, West Virginia.
- Coordinates: 38°17′8″N 82°11′31″W
- Country: United States
- State: West Virginia
- County: Lincoln
- Incorporated: June 19, 1947

Government
  - Mayor: Farris H. Burton, Jr.

Area
  - Total: 0.55 sq mi (1.43 km^{2})
  - Land: 0.53 sq mi (1.38 km^{2})
  - Water: 0.019 sq mi (0.05 km^{2})
- Elevation: 587 ft (179 m)

Population (2020)
  - Total: 524
  - Estimate (2021): 509
  - Density: 1,337.3/sq mi (516.34/km^{2})
- Time zone: UTC-5 (Eastern (EST))
  - Summer (DST): UTC-4 (EDT)
- ZIP code: 25571
- Area code: 304
- FIPS code: 54-85804
- GNIS feature ID: 1548934
- Website: local.wv.gov/westhamlin

West Hamlin is a town in Lincoln County, West Virginia, United States, along the Guyandotte River. The population was 519 at the 2020 census, and is now down to 509, according to the 2021 census. West Hamlin is a part of the Huntington-Ashland, WV-KY-OH, Metropolitan Statistical Area (MSA). West Hamlin is west of the county seat at Hamlin, hence the name.

== Geography ==
West Hamlin is located at 38°17′8″N 82°11′31″W (38.285461, -82.191991).

According to the United States Census Bureau, the town has a total area of 0.55 square miles (1.42 km^{2}), of which 0.53 square miles (1.37 km^{2}) is land and 0.02 square miles (0.05 km^{2}) is water.

== Demographics ==
Historical population
| Census | Pop. | Note | %± |
|---|---|---|---|
| 1950 | 793 | | — |
| 1960 | 788 | | −0.6% |
| 1970 | 715 | | −9.3% |
| 1980 | 643 | | −10.1% |
| 1990 | 423 | | −34.2% |
| 2000 | 696 | | 64.5% |
| 2010 | 774 | | 11.2% |
| 2020 | 524 | | −32.3% |
| 2021 (est.) | 509 | ▼ | −2.9% |
U.S. Decennial Census

=== 2010 census ===
At the 2010 census there were 774 people, 356 households, and 211 families living in the town. The population density was 1,460.4 inhabitants per square mile (563.9/km^{2}). There were 395 housing units at an average density of 745.3 per square mile (287.8/km^{2}). The racial makeup of the town was 98.3% White, 0.1% African American, and 1.6% from two or more races. Hispanic or Latino of any race were 0.9%.

Of the 356 households 30.9% had children under the age of 18 living with them, 41.3% were married couples living together, 14.6% had a female householder with no husband present, 3.4% had a male householder with no wife present, and 40.7% were non-families. 39.0% of households were one person and 18.5% were one person aged 65 or older. The average household size was 2.17 and the average family size was 2.83.

The median age in the town was 42.6 years. 23% of residents were under the age of 18; 7.9% were between the ages of 18 and 24; 22.8% were from 25 to 44; 27.8% were from 45 to 64; and 18.5% were 65 or older. The gender makeup of the town was 43.8% male and 56.2% female.

=== 2000 census ===
At the 2000 census there were 696 people, 305 households, and 190 families living in the town. The population density was 1,278.9 inhabitants per square mile (497.6/km^{2}). There were 335 housing units at an average density of 615.6 per square mile (239.5/km^{2}). The racial makeup of the town was 99.14% White, and 0.86% from two or more races. Hispanic or Latino of any race were 0.72%.

Of the 305 households 29.2% had children under the age of 18 living with them, 43.3% were married couples living together, 16.7% had a female householder with no husband present, and 37.4% were non-families. 35.1% of households were one person and 19.7% were one person aged 65 or older. The average household size was 2.26 and the average family size was 2.88.

The age distribution was 25.1% under the age of 18, 6.8% from 18 to 24, 25.1% from 25 to 44, 24.7% from 45 to 64, and 18.2% 65 or older. The median age was 40 years. For every 100 females, there were 87.1 males. For every 100 females age 18 and over, there were 82.2 males.

The median household income was $19,250 and the median family income was $27,308. Males had a median income of $32,857 versus $21,250 for females. The per capita income for the town was $13,072. About 28.9% of families and 35.4% of the population were below the poverty line, including 50.0% of those under age 18 and 31.5% of those age 65 or over.
