= Branchland, West Virginia =

Unincorporated community in West Virginia, United States

- Unincorporated community
- Location within West Virginia Location within the United States
- Coordinates: 38°13′15″N 82°12′14″W
- Country: United States
- State: West Virginia
- County: Lincoln
- Time zone: UTC-5 (Eastern (EST))
  - Summer (DST): UTC-4 (EDT)
- ZIP codes: 25506

Branchland (also Hadley) is an unincorporated community in western Lincoln County, West Virginia, United States. It lies along West Virginia Route 10, southwest of the town of Hamlin, the county seat of Lincoln County. Its elevation is 597 feet (182 m). It has a post office with the ZIP code 25506. Raccoon Creek Road is one of the more popular ways of transportation through the area. Branchland Post Office serves addresses within Sheridan Magisterial District of Lincoln County as well as addresses in southern Cabell County and eastern Wayne County, West Virginia.

== Etymology ==
The community derives its name from one Colonel Branch, a businessperson in the local coal-mining industry.

== Climate ==
The climate in this area is characterized by relatively high temperatures and evenly distributed precipitation throughout the year. According to the Köppen Climate Classification system, Branchland has a Humid subtropical climate, abbreviated "Cfa" on climate maps.

== Notable person ==
- Homer Heck, West Virginia state senator, was born in Branchland.
