= Leet, West Virginia =

- Unincorporated community
- Location within West Virginia Location within the United States
- Coordinates: 38°04′07″N 82°04′33″W
- Country: United States
- State: West Virginia
- County: Lincoln
- Elevation: 617 ft (188 m)
- Time zone: UTC-5 (Eastern (EST))
  - Summer (DST): UTC-4 (EDT)
- ZIP codes: 25536
- Area codes: 304 & 681
- GNIS feature ID: 1549780

Leet is an unincorporated community in Lincoln County, West Virginia, United States. Leet is 7 miles (11 km) north-northwest of Chapmanville.
