= Wewanta, West Virginia =

- Unincorporated community
- Location within West Virginia Location within the United States
- Coordinates: 38°5′18″N 82°11′34″W
- Country: United States
- State: West Virginia
- County: Lincoln
- Time zone: UTC-5 (Eastern (EST))
  - Summer (DST): UTC-4 (EDT)
- Area code: 304
- FIPS code: 1741691

Wewanta was an unincorporated community located in Lincoln County, West Virginia, United States.

== History ==
The town's unusual name is derived from a petition to secure a post office for the convenience of area residents, i.e. "We want a post office". The post office at Wewanta opened in 1903, and remained in operation until it was discontinued in 1947.
