= Big Ugly Creek =

Coordinates: 38°5′1″N 82°7′40″W

Location
- Country: United States

Basin features
- River system: Harts Creek district, Lincoln County, West Virginia

Big Ugly Creek is a major tributary of the Guyandotte River in the Harts Creek District of Lincoln County, West Virginia, United States. The creek was named as such because of an early settler at the mouth of the creek who was unpleasing to the eye and the crooked shape of the creek itself. Big Ugly Creek is a meandering stream stretching nearly 20 miles from U.S. Route 119 northeast of Chapmanville in Boone County to where it meets the Guyandotte River at Gill, an extinct railroad town north of Harts in Lincoln County. Big Ugly Creek is also at the southern end of the state's largest mountaintop removal mine, Arch Coal's Hobet 21. The mine stretches nearly 15 miles from near Julian, north of Madison in Boone County to right above the end of Fawn Hollow, which joins Big Ugly, not far from the Big Ugly Community Center.

Big Ugly Creek has frequently been noted on lists of unusual place names.

== See also ==
- List of rivers of West Virginia
