= Guyandotte River =

River in West Virginia, United States

Coordinates: 38°25′54″N 82°23′30″W

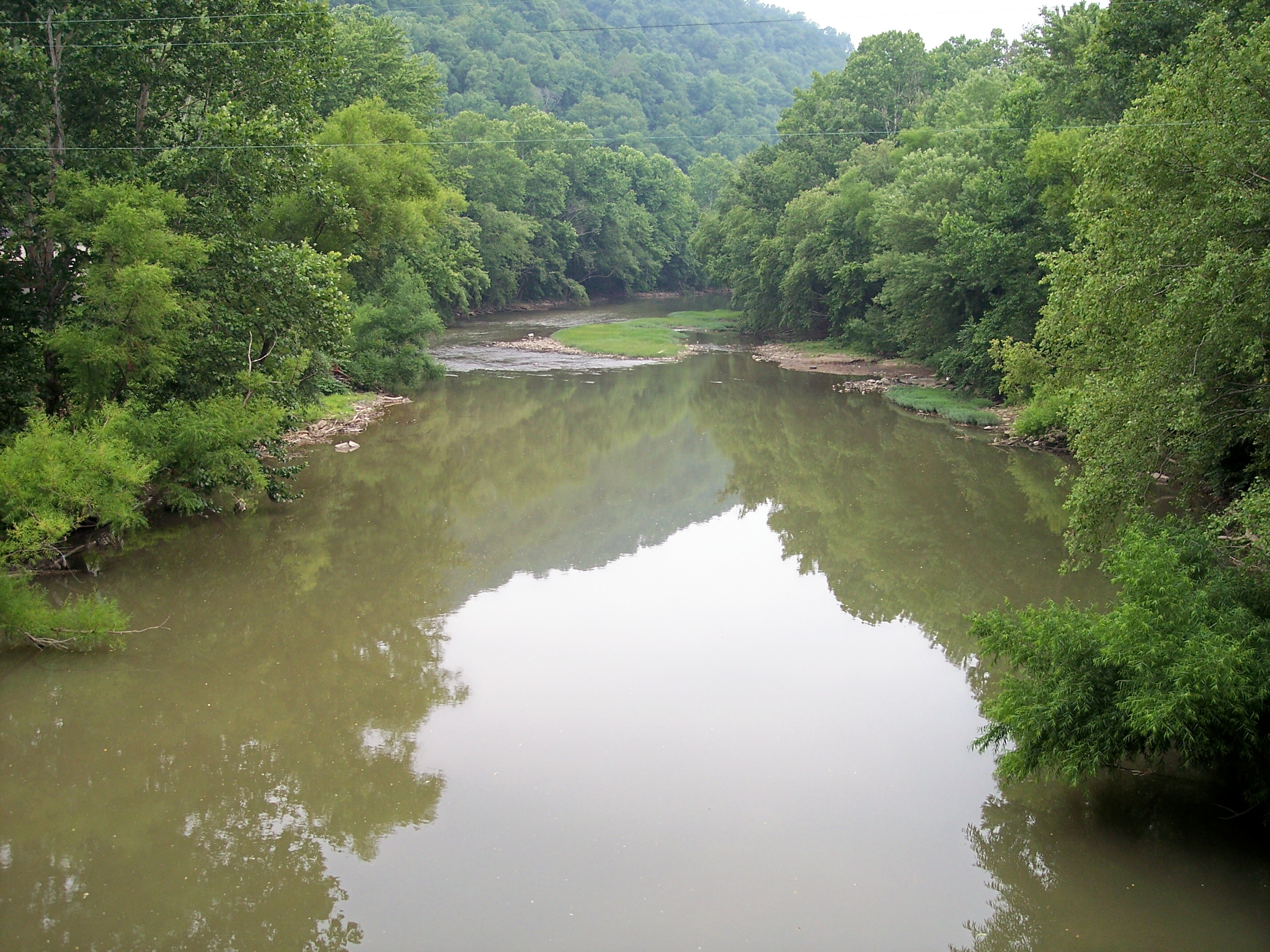
- The Guyandotte River in West Logan in 2007

Location
- Country: United States of America
- State: West Virginia

Physical characteristics
- Mouth: Huntington, West Virginia
- Discharge
  - location: mouth
  - average: 2,304.35 cu ft/s (65.252 m^{3}/s) (estimate)

Basin features
- River system: Ohio River

The Guyandotte River is a tributary of the Ohio River, approximately 166 mi (267 km) long, in southwestern West Virginia in the United States. It was named after the French term for the Wendat Native Americans. It drains an area of the unglaciated Allegheny Plateau south of the Ohio between the watersheds of the Kanawha River to the northeast and Twelvepole Creek and the Big Sandy River to the southwest. Via the Ohio River, it is part of the Mississippi River watershed.

== Course ==
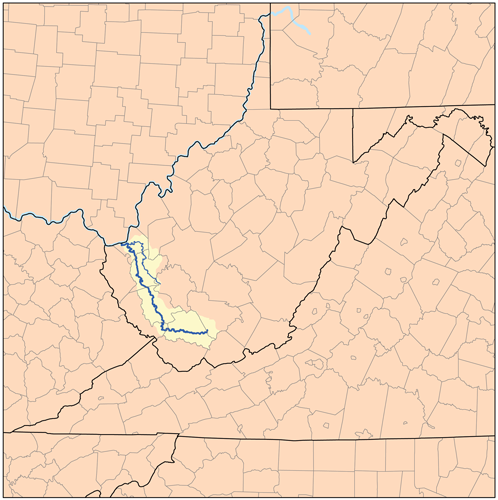
Guyandotte River watershed showing the Guyandotte and Mud rivers

The Guyandotte River is formed in southwestern Raleigh County by the confluence of three streams, Winding Gulf, Stonecoal Creek, and the Devils Fork. The Guyandotte flows initially west northwest into Wyoming and Mingo counties. It turns briefly northward in Mingo County and enters Logan County, where it turns north northwest for the remainder of its highly meandering course through Logan, Lincoln and Cabell counties. It enters the Ohio River from the south at Huntington, about 5 mi (8 km) east of the city's downtown.

== Dams ==
A U.S. Army Corps of Engineers dam in Mingo County causes the river to widen as R. D. Bailey Lake in Mingo and western Wyoming counties.

== Tributaries ==
The Mud River joins the Guyandotte at Barboursville in Cabell County. The Slab Fork joins the Guyandotte in downtown Mullens in Wyoming County. Big Ugly Creek joins the Guyandotte in Lincoln County.

== Upper Guyandotte Watershed Association ==
In Mullens, an active watershed organization is working to reduce pollution in the headwaters of the Guyandotte River. The Upper Guyandotte Watershed Association (UGWA) is a grassroots, community-based organization working to reduce sources of pollution in order to clean up streams and make the watershed a better place to live. UGWA has garnered much public support and produced results in partnering with numerous local, state, and federal agencies.

== Cities and towns along the Guyandotte River ==
- Barboursville
- Branchland, West Virginia
- Chapmanville
- Gilbert
- Harts
- Huntington
- Logan
- Man
- Corinne
- Mullens
- Pineville
- West Hamlin
- West Logan

== Variant names ==
According to the Geographic Names Information System (GNIS), the Guyandotte River has also been known as:

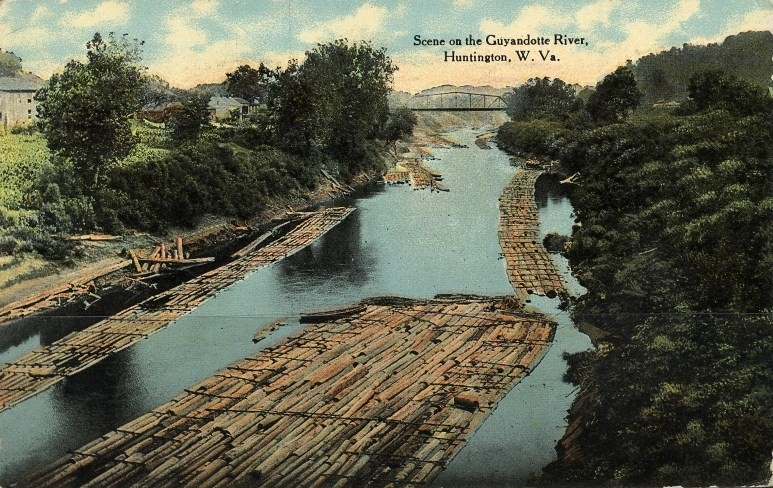
1912 postcard picture of river at Huntington, West Virginia

- Arbuckles River
- Big Laurel Fork
- Guiandotte River
- Guyan Dot River
- Guyan Dott River
- Guyan River
- Guyandates Creek
- Guyandot Creek
- Guyandot River
- Guyandott River
- La-ke-we-ke-ton
- Little Guiandot
- Se-co-ne
- Se-co-nee
- Secone
- Seconec

== See also ==
- List of West Virginia rivers
