= Ranger, West Virginia =

- Unincorporated community
- Location within West Virginia Location within the United States
- Coordinates: 38°7′14″N 82°11′8″W
- Country: United States
- State: West Virginia
- County: Lincoln

Government
  - Guyan River VFD: Chief William Frazier
- Time zone: UTC-5 (Eastern (EST))
  - Summer (DST): UTC-4 (EDT)
- ZIP codes: 25557

Ranger is an unincorporated community in western Lincoln County, West Virginia, United States. It lies along West Virginia Route 10 southwest of the town of Hamlin, the county seat of Lincoln County. Its elevation is 614 feet (187 m). It has a post office with the ZIP code 25557. Ranger is served by the Guyan River VFD.

The community takes its name from Ranger Branch creek.
