= Harts, West Virginia =

- Census-designated place
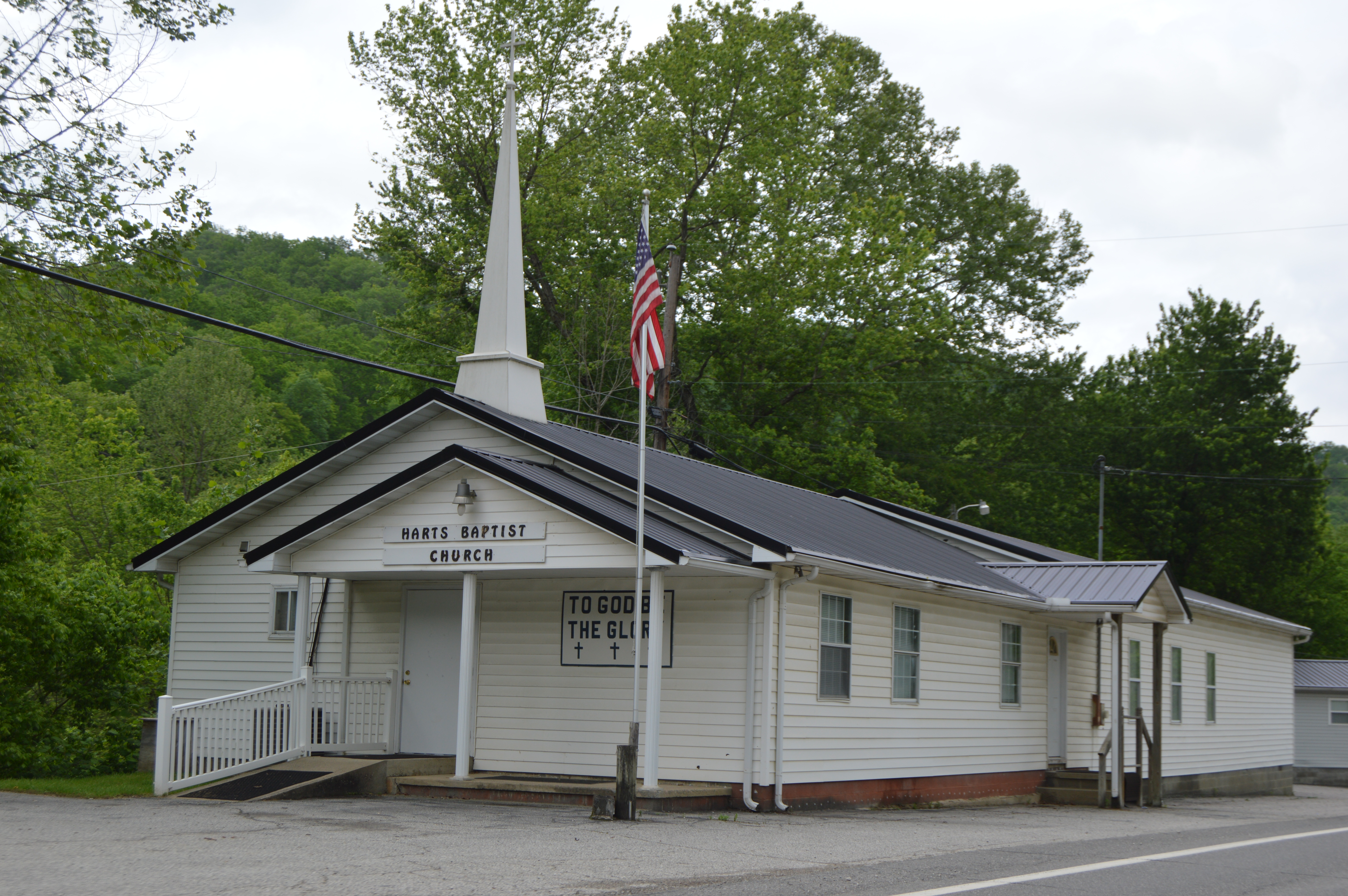
- Harts Baptist Church

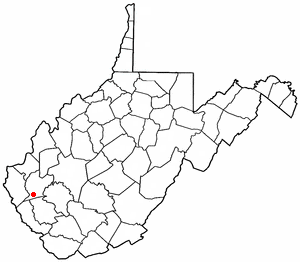
- Location of Harts, West Virginia
- Coordinates: 38°1′50″N 82°7′41″W
- Country: United States
- State: West Virginia
- County: Lincoln

Area
  - Total: 9.31 sq mi (24.12 km^{2})
  - Land: 9.18 sq mi (23.77 km^{2})
  - Water: 0.14 sq mi (0.35 km^{2})
- Elevation: 630 ft (192 m)

Population (2020)
  - Total: 573
  - Density: 71/sq mi (27.6/km^{2})
- Time zone: UTC-5 (Eastern (EST))
  - Summer (DST): UTC-4 (EDT)
- ZIP code: 25524
- Area code: 304
- FIPS code: 54-35596
- GNIS feature ID: 1540035

Harts is a census-designated place (CDP) at the mouth of Big Harts Creek in Lincoln County, West Virginia, United States, situated along the Guyandotte River. As of the 2020 census, its population was 573 (down from 656 at the 2010 census). Harts is a part of the Huntington-Ashland, WV-KY-OH, Metropolitan Statistical Area (MSA). The Harts CDP includes the unincorporated communities of Harts, Atenville, Ferrellsburg, and Sand Creek.

== Geography ==
Harts is located in southern Lincoln County at 38°1′50″N 82°7′41″W (38.030643, -82.128147). West Virginia Route 10 passes through the center of the community, following the Guyandotte River. The highway leads northwest (downstream) 44 miles (71 km) to Huntington and southeast (upstream) 10 miles (16 km) to Chapmanville.

According to the United States Census Bureau, the Harts CDP has a total area of 9.3 square miles (24.1 km^{2}), of which 9.2 square miles (23.8 km^{2}) are land and 0.1 square miles (0.3 km^{2}), or 1.44%, are water.

The census area includes both Big Harts Creek and Little Harts Creek. The West Fork of Big Harts Creek is often misidentified as "East Fork" on maps and in deeds. However, the West Fork was named for a man by the name of West, not the direction of the creek.

== Demographics ==
As of the census of 2000, there were 2,361 people, 858 households, and 700 families residing in the CDP. The population density was 78.9 people per square mile (30.5/km^{2}). There were 1,004 housing units at an average density of 33.5/sq mi (13.0/km^{2}). The racial makeup of the CDP was 99.36% White, 0.04% Native American, 0.17% Asian, and 0.42% from two or more races. Hispanic or Latino of any race were 0.21% of the population.

There were 858 households, out of which 36.2% had children under the age of 18 living with them, 66.2% were married couples living together, 10.4% had a female householder with no husband present, and 18.3% were non-families. 17.0% of all households were made up of individuals, and 7.1% had someone living alone who was 65 years of age or older. The average household size was 2.75 and the average family size was 3.07.

In the CDP, the population was spread out, with 24.6% under the age of 18, 10.3% from 18 to 24, 29.6% from 25 to 44, 25.2% from 45 to 64, and 10.3% who were 65 years of age or older. The median age was 36 years. For every 100 females, there were 102.8 males. For every 100 females age 18 and over, there were 99.1 males.

The median income for a household in the CDP was $21,703, and the median income for a family was $24,886. Males had a median income of $31,250 versus $20,357 for females. The per capita income for the CDP was $10,697. About 22.9% of families and 26.2% of the population were below the poverty line, including 31.7% of those under age 18 and 17.3% of those age 65 or over.

== History ==
Harts (town), situated at the mouth of Big Harts Creek, is named for Stephen Hart (Heart), an early settler who once lived in the area, or his father, the latter killed by Native Americans in the vicinity. Richard Elkins was the first permanent settler, arriving in 1807 or 1815. At the time of Elkins' settlement, depending on which year is accurate, the present-day town was part of Kanawha County or Cabell County. Prominent early families who settled in the present-day town of Harts included the Elkins, Adkins, and Toney families. After 1824, the area became a part of Logan County. Prior to the Civil War, Isaac Adkins (who lived at the present-day site of the Harts Fire Department) operated a large farm at "Harts Bottom." He was one of the area's most prominent landowners; Isaac Adkins Shoals are named for him. In the 1840s, James Toney, a native of present-day Boone County, acquired land from the Elkins settlers at the mouth of Big Harts Creek, just across the Guyandotte from Harts Bottom. During the Civil War, nearly all local men served in the Confederate States Army.

In 1869, the area became part of Lincoln County. In November or December 1870, Henry S. Godby established Hearts Creek Post Office. The Hearts Creek PO was discontinued in 1872. In 1877, merchant William T. "Bill" Fowler established Hart's Creek Post Office. This post office was discontinued in 1880. In 1881, Andrew D. Robinson established the Hart Post Office. During the 1880s, the Lincoln County Feud occurred in Harts and garnered headlines in newspapers across the United States. During the 1890s, Al and Hollena Brumfield were the most prominent residents. In 1904, the C&O Railroad passed through town. In 1910, Hart PO was discontinued. In 1916, Lewis Dempsey established Harts Post Office, which continues today. Prominent merchants during this time and in subsequent decades included F.E. Adkins, Herb Adkins, P.B. "Fed" Adkins, Hollena Brumfield, Fisher B. Adkins, Watson Adkins, and L.T. Jones.

The Harts Creek community includes the Harts Creek District of Lincoln County and a portion of Chapmanville District in Logan County. It includes the following communities, many of which once had post offices which are now closed: Atenville, Bulwark, Enzelo, Ferrellsburg, Fourteen, Fry, Gill, Green Shoal, Halcyon, Harts, Leet, Rector, Sand Creek, Shively, Spottswood, Toney, Warren, and Whirlwind. The larger community includes the following watersheds: Big Harts Creek (Lincoln and Logan counties), Big Ugly Creek, Fourteen Mile Creek, a portion of Kiahs Creek, Little Harts Creek, Little Ugly Creek, Sand Creek, Dry Branch, Browns Branch, Swift Shoals Branch, Walker Branch, Fowler Branch, Douglas Branch, Green Shoal Creek, and Abbotts Branch. These various locations were populated by numerous families prior to 1840: Brumfield, Elkins, Gore, Adkins, Fry, Brown, Lucas, Spurlock, Toney, Vance, Workman, Conley, Rowe, Adams, Browning, Collins, Dingess, Dolen, Heart, Johnson, Lambert, Lilly, Perry, Tomblin, Hensley, Butcher, White, Mullins, Dalton, Thompson, Dempsey, Abbott, Blankenship, Butcher, Estep, Farley, Ferrell, Nester, Richards, Spears, Dial, Carter, and Farmer. Most early settlers were of English origin.
