= Griffithsville, West Virginia =

- Unincorporated community
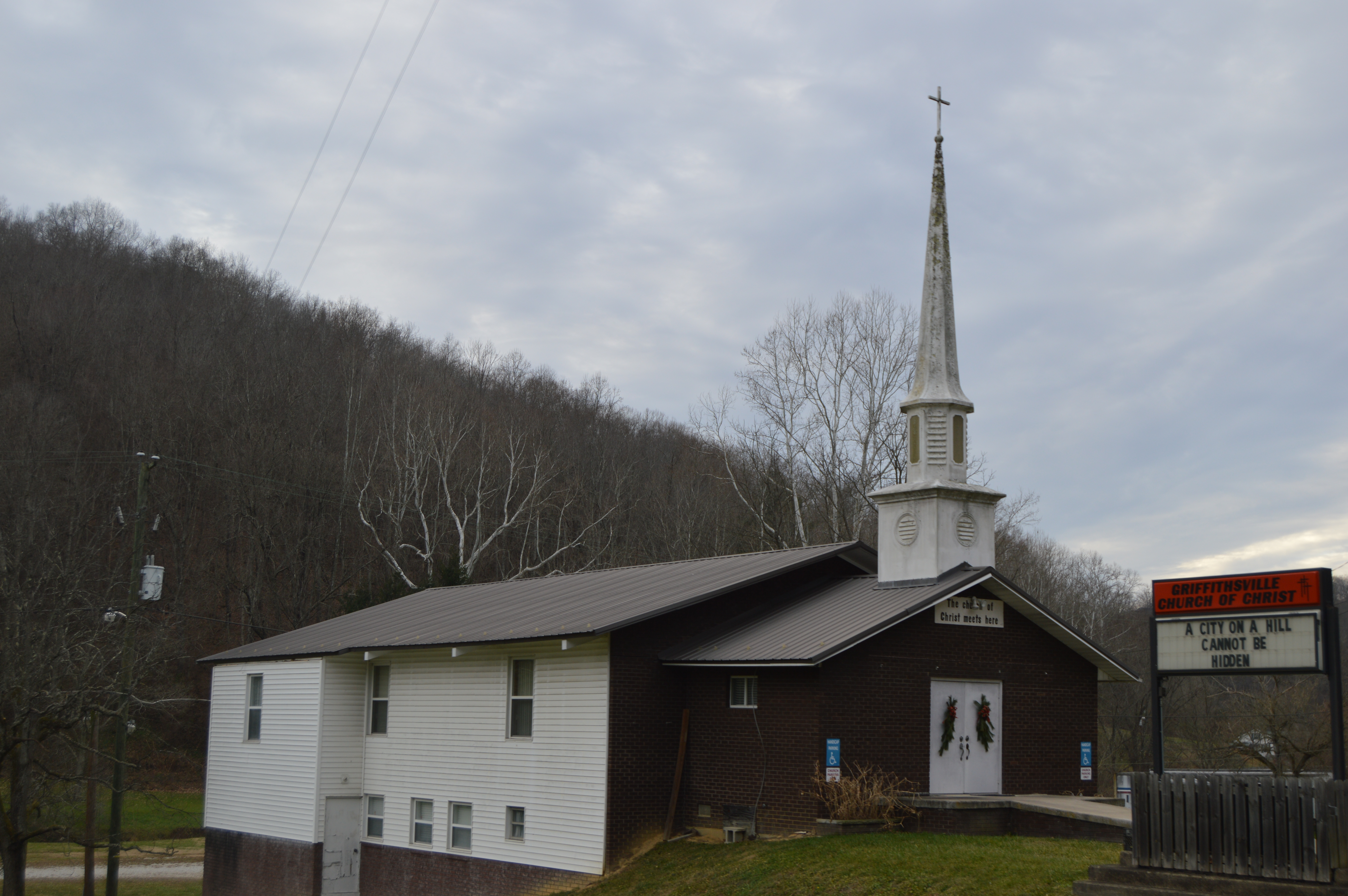
- Church of Christ in Griffithsville

- Location within West Virginia Location within the United States
- Coordinates: 38°14′19″N 81°59′21″W
- Country: United States
- State: West Virginia
- County: Lincoln

Population (2020)
  - Total: 1,101
- Time zone: UTC-5 (Eastern (EST))
  - Summer (DST): UTC-4 (EDT)
- ZIP codes: 25521

Griffithsville is an unincorporated community in eastern Lincoln County, West Virginia, United States. It has a population of 1,101. It lies along West Virginia Route 3 southeast of the town of Hamlin, the county seat of Lincoln County. Its elevation is 659 feet (201 m). It has a post office with the ZIP code 25521.
