= Lincoln County, West Virginia =

County in West Virginia, United States

- County
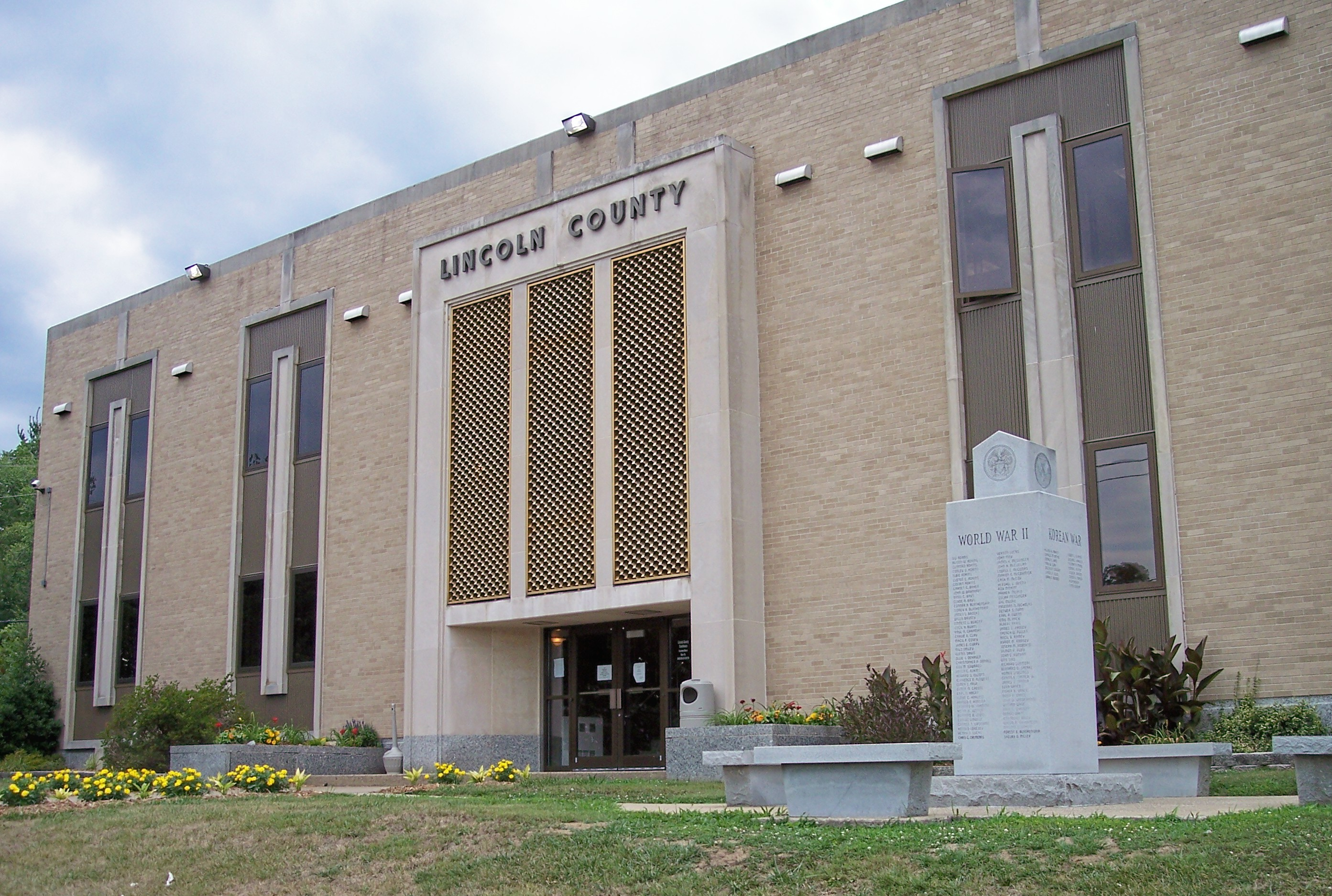
- The Lincoln County Courthouse in Hamlin in 2007

- Location within the U.S. state of West Virginia
- Coordinates: 38°11′N 82°04′W
- Country: United States
- State: West Virginia
- Founded: February 23, 1867
- Named for: Abraham Lincoln
- Seat: Hamlin
- Largest town: Hamlin

Area
  - Total: 439 sq mi (1,140 km^{2})
  - Land: 437 sq mi (1,130 km^{2})
  - Water: 1.6 sq mi (4.1 km^{2}) 0.4%

Population (2020)
  - Total: 20,463
  - Estimate (2025): 19,177 ▼
  - Density: 46.8/sq mi (18.1/km^{2})
- Time zone: UTC−5 (Eastern)
  - Summer (DST): UTC−4 (EDT)
- Congressional district: 1st
- Website: www.lincolncountywv.org

Lincoln County is a county in the U.S. state of West Virginia. As of the 2020 census, the population was 20,463. Its county seat is Hamlin. The county was created in 1867 and named for Abraham Lincoln. Lincoln County is part of the Huntington-Ashland, WV-KY-OH Metropolitan Statistical Area.

== History ==
Lincoln County was created by an act of the West Virginia Legislature on February 23, 1867, from parts of Boone, Cabell, Kanawha and Putnam counties. By 1869, the county had returned much of its Putnam County territory and absorbed the northern portion of Logan County and a portion of Wayne County. In 1869, Harts Creek Township (later district) was created from this latter region. Lincoln County is one of five counties created by West Virginia since the Civil War. Hamlin, seat of government for the county, was established in 1853.

Jesse, John, David, William, and Moses McComas were the first Anglo settlers in what is now Lincoln County. They cultivated 20 acres (81,000 m^{2}) of corn, the first ever grown in the area near present-day West Hamlin, in 1799. Later that year, they returned to eastern Virginia to get their families. Their families were initially left behind because it was not known if there were any hostile Native Americans in the area, or if the soil would be suitable for cultivation. John Lucas, William Hinch, and John Johnson soon joined the McComases in the county. They built cabins in the county around 1800. About 1804, William Wirt Brumfield settled at the mouth of Big Ugly Creek.

Based on military enlistments, Lincoln County appears to have been evenly divided in its sympathies during the Civil War. The county hosted a handful of small skirmishes, mostly centered on Mud River.

After the war, timbering constituted the county's primary industry. The county also became nationally known for its tobacco cultivation. In the early twentieth century, the county experienced a gas boom.

In 1863, West Virginia's counties were divided into civil townships, with the intention of encouraging local government. This proved impractical in the heavily rural state, and in 1872 the townships were converted into magisterial districts. Between its formation in 1867 and 1870, Lincoln County was divided into seven townships: Carroll, Duval, (Note: Also spelled "Duvall" in earlier records.) Harts Creek, (Note: Originally spelled "Hart's Creek".) Jefferson, Sheridan, Union, and Washington. In 1871, Laurel Hill Township was formed from portions of Harts Creek and Sheridan Townships. The following year, the eight townships became magisterial districts. Except for minor adjustments, the eight historic magisterial districts remained largely unchanged until the twenty-first century, when they were consolidated into three new districts: District 1, District 2, and District 3.

== Geography ==
According to the United States Census Bureau, the county has a total area of 439 square miles (1,140 km^{2}), of which 437 square miles (1,130 km^{2}) is land and 1.6 square miles (4.1 km^{2}) (0.4%) is water.

=== Major highways ===
- U.S. Highway 119
- West Virginia Route 3
- West Virginia Route 10
- West Virginia Route 34
- West Virginia Route 37
- West Virginia Route 214

=== Adjacent counties ===
- Putnam County (north)
- Kanawha County (northeast)
- Boone County (southeast)
- Logan County (south)
- Mingo County (southwest)
- Wayne County (west)
- Cabell County (northwest)

== Demographics ==
Historical population
Census	Pop.	Note	%±
1870	5,053		—
1880	8,739		72.9%
1890	11,246		28.7%
1900	15,434		37.2%
1910	20,491		32.8%
1920	19,378		−5.4%
1930	19,156		−1.1%
1940	22,886		19.5%
1950	22,466		−1.8%
1960	20,267		−9.8%
1970	18,912		−6.7%
1980	23,675		25.2%
1990	21,382		−9.7%
2000	22,108		3.4%
2010	21,720		−1.8%
2020	20,463		−5.8%
2025 (est.)	19,177	▼	−6.3%
U.S. Decennial Census; 1790–1960 1900–1990; 1990–2000 2010–2020

=== 2020 census ===
As of the 2020 census, the county had a population of 20,463. Of the residents, 22.2% were under the age of 18 and 20.1% were 65 years of age or older; the median age was 43.9 years. For every 100 females there were 98.2 males, and for every 100 females age 18 and over there were 97.4 males.

The racial makeup of the county was 96.7% White, 0.2% Black or African American, 0.1% American Indian and Alaska Native, 0.1% Asian, 0.2% from some other race, and 2.6% from two or more races. Hispanic or Latino residents of any race comprised 0.8% of the population.

There were 8,205 households in the county, of which 29.6% had children under the age of 18 living with them and 25.0% had a female householder with no spouse or partner present. About 26.5% of all households were made up of individuals and 12.4% had someone living alone who was 65 years of age or older.

There were 9,549 housing units, of which 14.1% were vacant. Among occupied housing units, 78.5% were owner-occupied and 21.5% were renter-occupied. The homeowner vacancy rate was 1.6% and the rental vacancy rate was 9.0%.

Lincoln County, West Virginia – Racial and ethnic composition Note: the US Census treats Hispanic/Latino as an ethnic category. This table excludes Latinos from the racial categories and assigns them to a separate category. Hispanics/Latinos may be of any race.
Race / Ethnicity (NH = Non-Hispanic)	Pop 2000	Pop 2010	Pop 2020	% 2000	% 2010	% 2020
White alone (NH)	21,787	21,433	19,702	98.54%	98.67%	96.28%
Black or African American alone (NH)	13	18	44	0.05%	0.08%	0.21%
Native American or Alaska Native alone (NH)	37	18	22	0.16%	0.08%	0.10%
Asian alone (NH)	12	24	26	0.05%	0.11%	0.12%
Pacific Islander alone (NH)	2	0	0	0.00%	0.00%	0.00%
Other race alone (NH)	7	3	21	0.03%	0.01%	0.10%
Mixed race or Multiracial (NH)	129	128	477	0.58%	0.58%	2.33%
Hispanic or Latino (any race)	121	96	171	0.54%	0.44%	0.83%
Total	22,108	21,720	20,463	100.00%	100.00%	100.00%

=== 2010 census ===
As of the 2010 United States census, there were 21,720 people, 8,783 households, and 6,268 families living in the county. The population density was 49.7 inhabitants per square mile (19.2/km^{2}). There were 9,887 housing units at an average density of 22.6 per square mile (8.7/km^{2}). The racial makeup of the county was 99.0% white, 0.1% Asian, 0.1% American Indian, 0.1% black or African American, 0.1% from other races, and 0.6% from two or more races. Those of Hispanic or Latino origin made up 0.4% of the population. In terms of ancestry, 27.0% were American, 12.8% were Irish, 12.4% were English, and 12.4% were German.

Of the 8,783 households, 32.3% had children under the age of 18 living with them, 55.3% were married couples living together, 10.7% had a female householder with no husband present, 28.6% were non-families, and 25.6% of all households were made up of individuals. The average household size was 2.47 and the average family size was 2.92. The median age was 41.2 years.

The median income for a household in the county was $30,868 and the median income for a family was $37,667. Males had a median income of $43,662 versus $23,166 for females. The per capita income for the county was $16,439. About 22.8% of families and 26.6% of the population were below the poverty line, including 37.7% of those under age 18 and 13.2% of those age 65 or over.

=== 2000 census ===
As of the census of 2000, there were 22,108 people, 8,664 households, and 6,532 families living in the county. The population density was 50 inhabitants per square mile (19/km^{2}). There were 9,846 housing units at an average density of 22 units per square mile (8.5 units/km^{2}). The racial makeup of the county was 99.04% White, 0.06% Black or African American, 0.17% Native American, 0.06% Asian, 0.01% Pacific Islander, 0.06% from other races, and 0.61% from two or more races. 0.55% of the population were Hispanic or Latino of any race.

There were 8,664 households, out of which 33.00% had children under the age of 18 living with them, 60.40% were married couples living together, 10.80% had a female householder with no husband present, and 24.60% were non-families. 22.20% of all households were made up of individuals, and 10.40% had someone living alone who was 65 years of age or older. The average household size was 2.54 and the average family size was 2.94.

In the county, the population was spread out, with 23.60% under the age of 18, 9.30% from 18 to 24, 29.10% from 25 to 44, 24.90% from 45 to 64, and 13.10% who were 65 years of age or older. The median age was 37 years. For every 100 females there were 97.20 males. For every 100 females age 18 and over, there were 96.00 males.

The median income for a household in the county was $22,662, and the median income for a family was $28,297. Males had a median income of $30,810 versus $18,270 for females. The per capita income for the county was $13,073. About 22.80% of families and 27.90% of the population were below the poverty line, including 37.60% of those under age 18 and 20.80% of those age 65 or over.

== Politics ==
Like the rest of West Virginia, Lincoln county was solidly Democratic up until the 2000s. After they took a massive shift towards the GOP, the last Democratic candidate to carry Lincoln County was Al Gore in 2000.

United States presidential election results for Lincoln County, West Virginia
Year	Republican		Democratic		Third party(ies)	
Year	No.	%	No.	%	No.	%
1912	631	15.09%	1,876	44.87%	1,674	40.04%
1916	2,104	49.20%	2,113	49.42%	59	1.38%
1920	3,339	55.58%	2,649	44.09%	20	0.33%
1924	3,164	47.29%	3,355	50.15%	171	2.56%
1928	3,823	52.81%	3,416	47.19%	0	0.00%
1932	3,881	44.32%	4,876	55.68%	0	0.00%
1936	4,382	44.93%	5,370	55.07%	0	0.00%
1940	4,818	47.96%	5,228	52.04%	0	0.00%
1944	4,175	53.33%	3,654	46.67%	0	0.00%
1948	4,065	47.74%	4,433	52.07%	16	0.19%
1952	4,784	48.41%	5,099	51.59%	0	0.00%
1956	4,954	49.91%	4,972	50.09%	0	0.00%
1960	4,579	47.69%	5,023	52.31%	0	0.00%
1964	3,436	36.99%	5,852	63.01%	0	0.00%
1968	3,662	42.43%	4,386	50.82%	583	6.75%
1972	4,673	54.66%	3,876	45.34%	0	0.00%
1976	2,997	36.30%	5,260	63.70%	0	0.00%
1980	4,009	42.24%	5,317	56.03%	164	1.73%
1984	4,405	44.49%	5,467	55.21%	30	0.30%
1988	3,457	40.53%	5,049	59.20%	23	0.27%
1992	2,637	33.03%	4,502	56.39%	845	10.58%
1996	2,530	30.72%	4,994	60.64%	711	8.63%
2000	3,389	45.40%	3,939	52.77%	136	1.82%
2004	4,102	49.35%	4,048	48.70%	162	1.95%
2008	3,637	53.21%	3,029	44.32%	169	2.47%
2012	4,383	64.29%	2,227	32.66%	208	3.05%
2016	5,307	74.36%	1,459	20.44%	371	5.20%
2020	6,012	76.77%	1,711	21.85%	108	1.38%
2024	5,770	80.28%	1,279	17.80%	138	1.92%

== Communities ==
=== Towns ===
- Hamlin (county seat)
- West Hamlin

=== Magisterial districts ===
==== Current ====
- District 1
- District 2
- District 3

==== Historic ====
- Carroll
- Duval
- Harts Creek
- Jefferson
- Laurel Hill
- Sheridan
- Union
- Washington

=== Census-designated places ===
- Alum Creek (part)
- Harts

=== Unincorporated communities ===
- Alkol
- Atenville
- Branchland
- Eden Park
- Ferrellsburg
- Fourteen
- Garretts Bend
- Gill
- Green Shoal
- Griffithsville
- Leet
- Midkiff
- Myra
- Pleasant View
- Ranger
- Rector
- Sod
- Sumerco
- Sweetland
- Tango
- Toney
- Warren
- Wewanta
- Yawkey

== Notable people ==
- Dagmar, actress
- Lloyd G. Jackson, politician
- Clark Kessinger, fiddler
- Clark W. May, politician
- J. S. Pridemore, oil industrialist
- Johnny Sias, professional disc golfer and PDGA World Champion
- Russ Thomas, professional football player
- John S. Witcher, Civil War senior officer
- Chuck Yeager, aviator
- Fred "Sonic" Smith, musician

== See also ==
- Lincoln County Schools
- Big Ugly Wildlife Management Area
- National Register of Historic Places listings in Lincoln County, West Virginia
