= Hamlin, West Virginia =

- Town
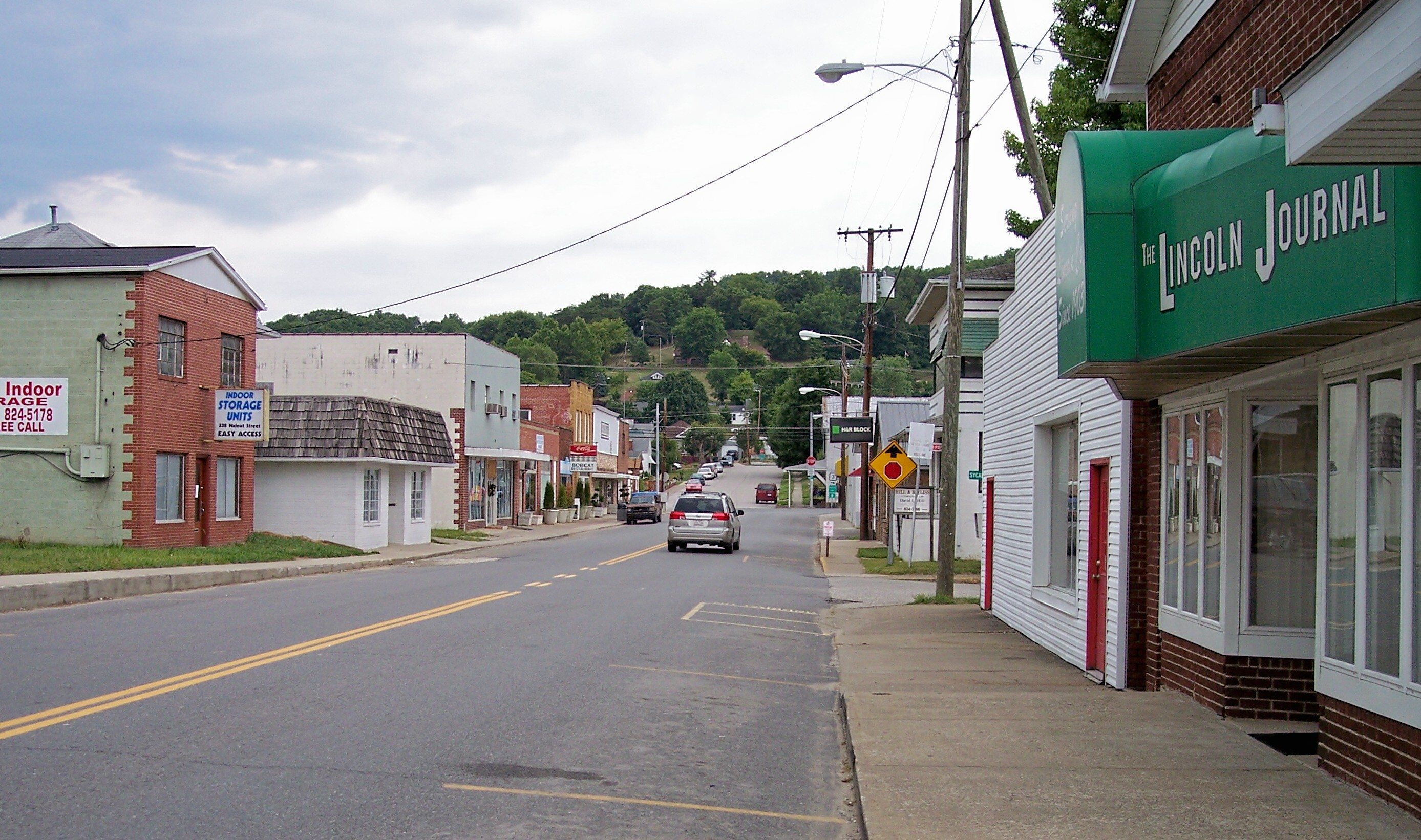
- Walnut Street (West Virginia Route 3) in Hamlin in 2007
- Interactive map of Hamlin, West Virginia
- Location within West Virginia Location within the United States
- Coordinates: 38°16′44″N 82°6′25″W
- Country: United States
- State: West Virginia
- County: Lincoln

Area
  - Total: 0.60 sq mi (1.56 km^{2})
  - Land: 0.60 sq mi (1.55 km^{2})
  - Water: 0.0039 sq mi (0.01 km^{2})
- Elevation: 653 ft (199 m)

Population (2020)
  - Total: 1,039
  - Estimate (2021): 1,019
  - Density: 1,754.7/sq mi (677.51/km^{2})
- Time zone: UTC-5 (Eastern (EST))
  - Summer (DST): UTC-4 (EDT)
- ZIP code: 25523
- Area code: 304
- FIPS code: 54-34516
- GNIS feature ID: 1539881
- Website: local.wv.gov/hamlin/Pages/default.aspx

Hamlin is a town in and the county seat of Lincoln County, West Virginia, United States, along the Mud River. The population was recorded as 1,040 at the 2020 census. It is part of the Huntington–Ashland metropolitan area.

== History ==
The town was established in 1833 by an act of the Virginia General Assembly. Hamlin was named for Bishop Leonidas Lent Hamline of the Methodist Church. A former postmaster claimed that Bishop Hamline added the "E" to his last name.

== Government ==
Hamlin is governed by five council members and a mayor and recorder. The mayor is David Adkins, with Daniel Mckay as recorder and Haroldene Keener, Richard Walls, Margarert McClure, Trina Barrett and William Browning as the five council members. Elections took place in 2022. The mayor, recorder and council members are elected to four-year terms.

== Geography ==
Hamlin is located at 38°16′44″N 82°6′25″W (38.278946, -82.106825).

According to the United States Census Bureau, the town has a total area of 0.60 square miles (1.55 km^{2}), all land.

=== Climate ===
The climate in this area is characterized by relatively high temperatures and evenly distributed precipitation throughout the year. According to the Köppen Climate Classification system, Hamlin has a Humid subtropical climate, abbreviated "Cfa" on climate maps.

Climate data for Hamlin, West Virginia (1991–2020)
Month	Jan	Feb	Mar	Apr	May	Jun	Jul	Aug	Sep	Oct	Nov	Dec	Year
Mean daily maximum °F (°C)	44.5 (6.9)	49.0 (9.4)	58.2 (14.6)	70.5 (21.4)	78.5 (25.8)	85.1 (29.5)	88.3 (31.3)	87.7 (30.9)	82.4 (28.0)	71.5 (21.9)	59.1 (15.1)	48.3 (9.1)	68.6 (20.3)
Daily mean °F (°C)	33.8 (1.0)	37.0 (2.8)	44.8 (7.1)	55.2 (12.9)	64.7 (18.2)	72.3 (22.4)	76.1 (24.5)	75.3 (24.1)	69.0 (20.6)	56.9 (13.8)	45.6 (7.6)	37.7 (3.2)	55.7 (13.2)
Mean daily minimum °F (°C)	23.0 (−5.0)	25.0 (−3.9)	31.3 (−0.4)	39.9 (4.4)	50.8 (10.4)	59.5 (15.3)	63.9 (17.7)	62.9 (17.2)	55.6 (13.1)	42.2 (5.7)	32.0 (0.0)	27.2 (−2.7)	42.8 (6.0)
Average precipitation inches (mm)	3.30 (84)	3.37 (86)	4.43 (113)	3.74 (95)	5.00 (127)	4.65 (118)	5.48 (139)	3.53 (90)	3.64 (92)	3.48 (88)	3.16 (80)	3.80 (97)	47.58 (1,209)
Average snowfall inches (cm)	7.1 (18)	4.4 (11)	3.2 (8.1)	0.2 (0.51)	0.0 (0.0)	0.0 (0.0)	0.0 (0.0)	0.0 (0.0)	0.0 (0.0)	0.1 (0.25)	0.5 (1.3)	3.0 (7.6)	18.5 (46.76)
Source: NOAA

== Demographics ==
Historical population
Census	Pop.	Note	%±
1920	516		—
1930	844		63.6%
1940	850		0.7%
1950	841		−1.1%
1960	850		1.1%
1970	1,024		20.5%
1980	1,219		19.0%
1990	1,030		−15.5%
2000	1,119		8.6%
2010	1,142		2.1%
2020	1,039		−9.0%
2021 (est.)	1,019	▼	−1.9%
U.S. Decennial Census

=== 2010 census ===
As of the census of 2010, there were 1,142 people, 467 households, and 311 families living in the town. The population density was 1,903.3 inhabitants per square mile (734.9/km^{2}). There were 528 housing units at an average density of 880.0 per square mile (339.8/km^{2}). The racial makeup of the town was 99.0% White, 0.1% Native American, 0.1% Asian, and 0.8% from two or more races. Hispanic or Latino of any race were 0.9% of the population.

There were 467 households, of which 29.3% had children under the age of 18 living with them, 43.5% were married couples living together, 16.7% had a female householder with no husband present, 6.4% had a male householder with no wife present, and 33.4% were non-families. 30.6% of all households were made up of individuals, and 12.8% had someone living alone who was 65 years of age or older. The average household size was 2.32 and the average family size was 2.82.

The median age in the town was 43.2 years. 19.7% of residents were under the age of 18; 9.3% were between the ages of 18 and 24; 23% were from 25 to 44; 26.1% were from 45 to 64; and 21.9% were 65 years of age or older. The gender makeup of the town was 46.2% male and 53.8% female.

=== 2000 census ===
As of the census of 2000, there were 1,119 people, 478 households, and 312 families living in the town. The population density was 1,949.7 inhabitants per square mile (758.0/km^{2}). There were 527 housing units at an average density of 918.2 per square mile (357.0/km^{2}). The racial makeup of the town was 98.84% White, 0.09% African American, 0.27% Native American, and 0.80% from two or more races. Hispanic or Latino of any race were 0.54% of the population.

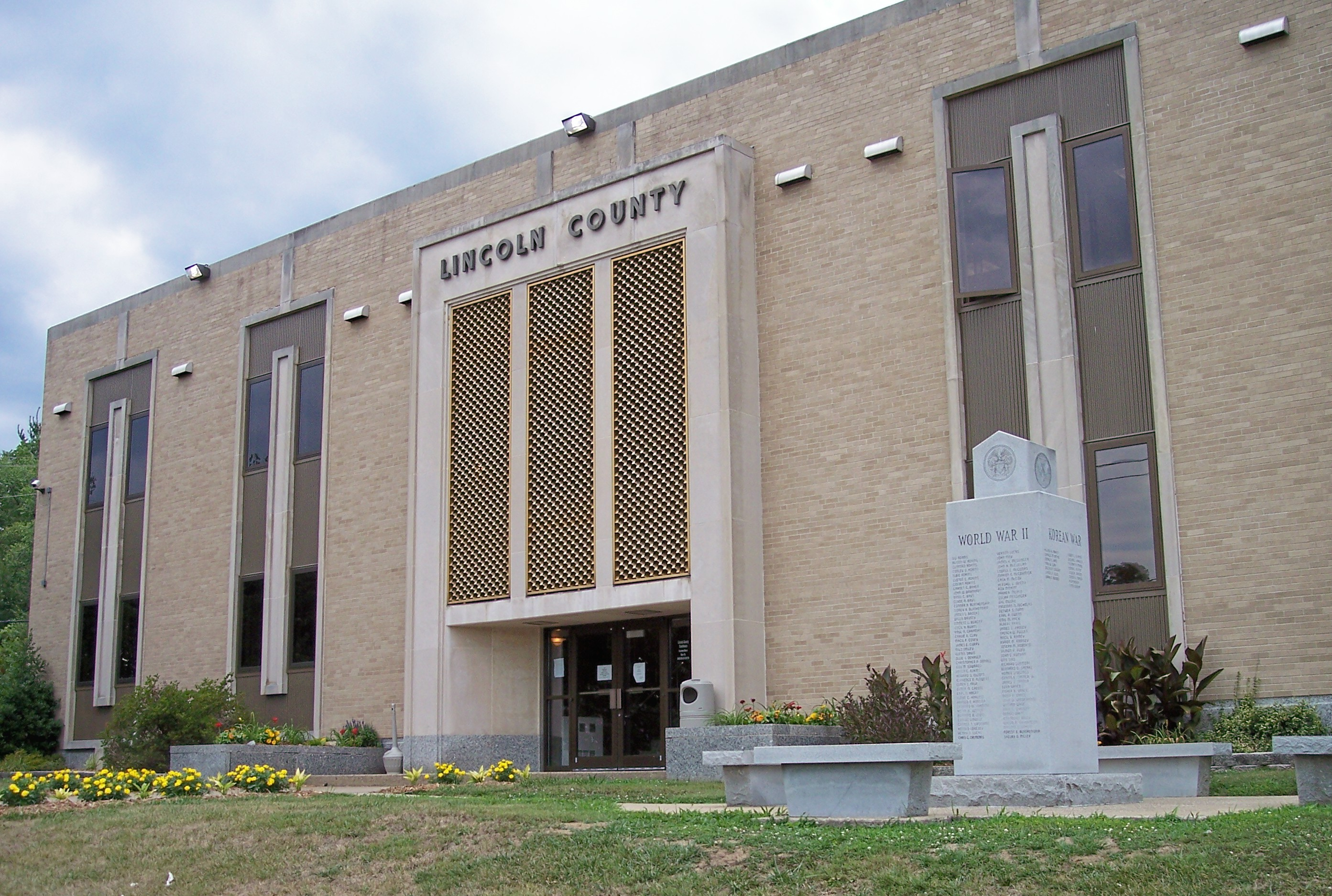
The Lincoln County Courthouse in Hamlin in 2007.

There were 478 households, out of which 29.3% had children under the age of 18 living with them, 43.9% were married couples living together, 17.6% had a female householder with no husband present, and 34.7% were non-families. 32.4% of all households were made up of individuals, and 15.7% had someone living alone who was 65 years of age or older. The average household size was 2.21 and the average family size was 2.77.

In the town, the population was spread out, with 21.0% under the age of 18, 9.1% from 18 to 24, 26.9% from 25 to 44, 21.2% from 45 to 64, and 21.8% who were 65 years of age or older. The median age was 41 years. For every 100 females there were 80.2 males. For every 100 females age 18 and over, there were 73.7 males.

The median income for a household in the town was $22,143, and the median income for a family was $30,250. Males had a median income of $30,000 versus $17,059 for females. The per capita income for the town was $13,728. About 20.3% of families and 22.6% of the population were below the poverty line, including 38.0% of those under age 18 and 12.1% of those age 65 or over.

== Notable people ==
- Ev Elkins, former NFL Back
- Lloyd G. Jackson, politician
- J. S. Pridemore, oil industrialist
- Stephanie Thacker, federal judge, US 4th Circuit Court of Appeals
- Chuck Yeager, aviator
