= Kiahsville, West Virginia =

Kiahsville
- unincorporated community
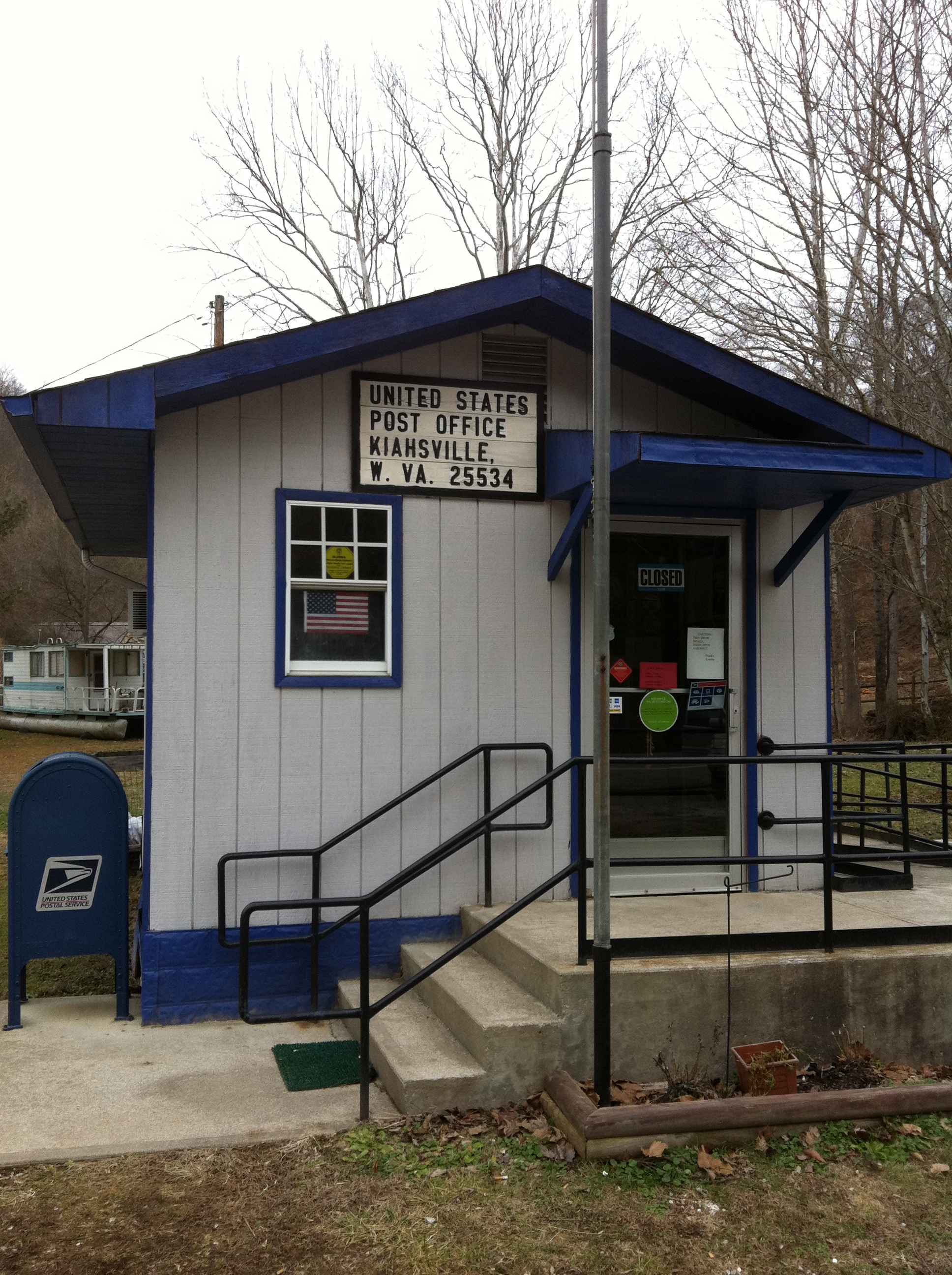
- Kiahsville Post Office, established in 1884.

- Location within the state of West Virginia Kiahsville (the United States)
- Coordinates: 38°5′29″N 82°19′42″W
- Country: United States
- State: West Virginia
- County: Wayne

Area
  - Land: 17.749 sq mi (45.97 km^{2})
  - Water: 0.000 sq mi (0 km^{2})
- Elevation: 708 ft (216 m)

Population (2000)
  - Total: 314 (336 as of 2,009)
  - Density: 17.69/sq mi (6.83/km^{2})
- Time zone: UTC-5 (Eastern (EST))
  - Summer (DST): UTC-5 (CDT)
- ZIP code: 25534
- Area code: 304

Kiahsville is an unincorporated community in southern Wayne County, West Virginia, United States. It is a part of the Huntington-Ashland, WV-KY-OH, Metropolitan Statistical Area (MSA). As of the 2000 census, the MSA had a population of 288,649. Its sister town is nearby Cove Gap.

Kiahsville is situated at the mouth of Kiah Creek. The community derives its name from Hezekiah Wiley, the name of an early settler.

East Lynn Lake is located nearby.

== Nearby communities ==
- Cove Gap (0.1 miles)
- Queens Ridge
- Cuzzie (2.7 miles)
- Brabant (3.6 miles)
- Harts (7.7 miles)
- Ranger (8.1 miles)
- Wilsondale (9.4 miles)
- Breeden (9.5 miles)
- Genoa (9.6 miles)
- East Lynn (9.6 miles)
- Midkiff (10.8 miles)
- Dunlow (11.9 miles)
- Crum (12.7 miles)
