= West Virginia Route 37 =

State highway in West Virginia, United States

West Virginia Route 37

Route information
- Maintained by WVDOH
- Length: 39.4 mi (63.4 km)

Major junctions
- West end: KY 3 Spur in Fort Gay
- US 52 concurrent near Fort Gay; WV 152 concurrent near Wayne
- East end: WV 10 near Ranger

Location
- Country: United States
- State: West Virginia
- Counties: Wayne, Lincoln

Highway system
- West Virginia State Highway System; Interstate; US; State
| ← WV 36 | → WV 38 |

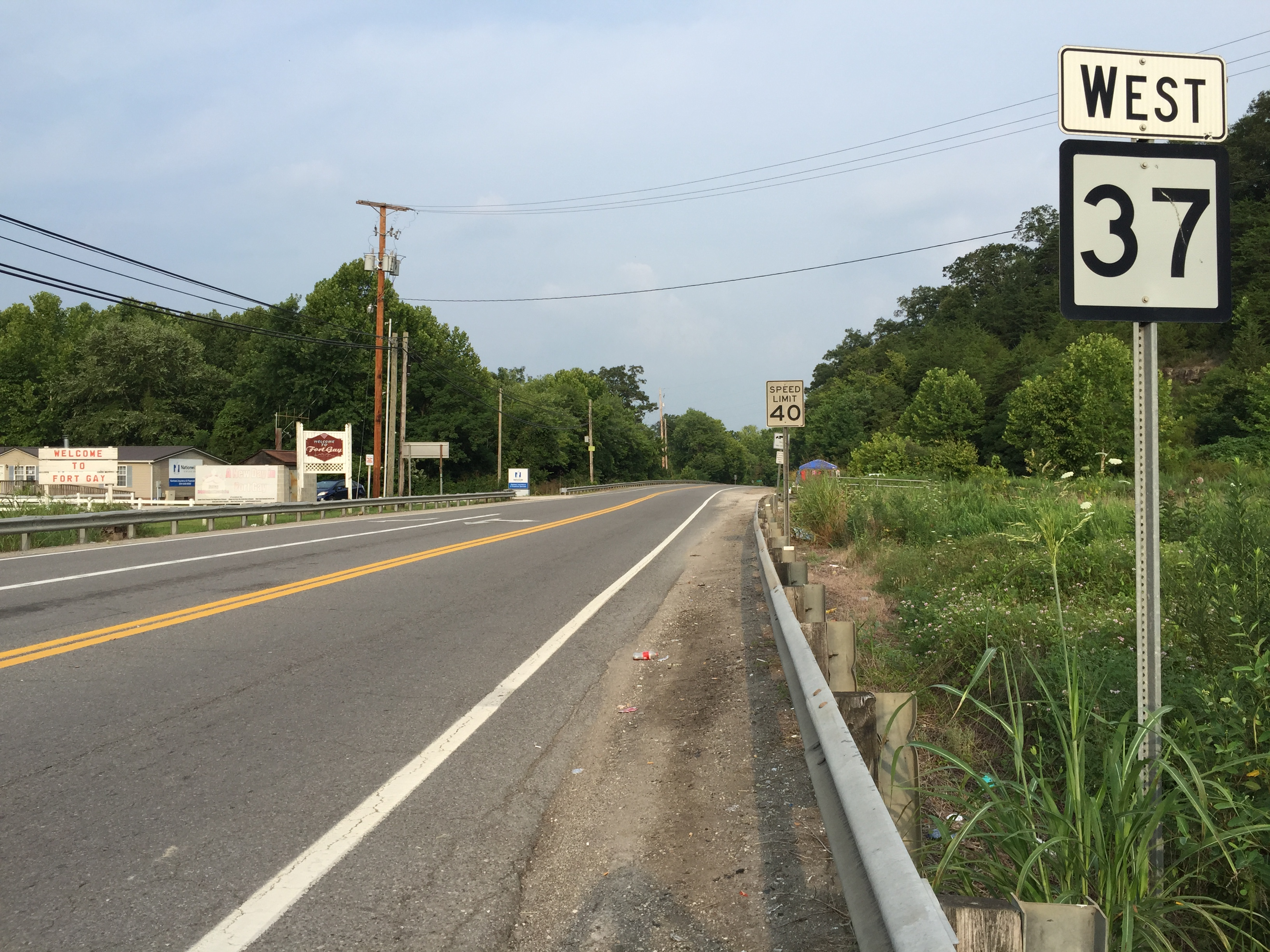
View west along WV 37 at US 52 in Fort Gay

West Virginia Route 37 is an east–west state highway in western West Virginia. The western terminus of the route is at the Kentucky state line in Fort Gay, where WV 37 becomes Kentucky Route 3 Spur upon crossing the Tug Fork. The eastern terminus is at West Virginia Route 10 one mile (1.6 km) south of Ranger.

== History ==
A large portion of WV 37 was relocated in eastern Wayne County about 1970 as a result of the construction of East Lynn Lake, which flooded the route's former path along East Fork Twelvepole Creek. The highway was relocated up a series of side valleys from just downstream of the dam to near Kiahsville. East of Kiahsville, the road was moved to a higher elevation out of the lake's floodplain.

== Major intersections ==
| County | Location | mi | km | Destinations | Notes |
|---|---|---|---|---|---|
| Big Sandy River | | 0.0 | 0.0 | KY 3 (via KY 3 Spur) – Louisa, Inez, Kermit | |
| Big Sandy River | | 0.0 | 0.0 | Louisa–Fort Gay Bridge; Kentucky state line | |
| Wayne | Fort Gay | | | US 52 south – Williamson | west end of US 52 overlap |
| Wayne | | | | US 52 north – Huntington | east end of US 52 overlap |
| Wayne | Echo | | | WV 152 south – Crum | west end of WV 152 overlap |
| Wayne | Wayne | | | WV 152 north – Huntington | east end of WV 152 overlap |
| Lincoln | | | | WV 10 – Huntington, Logan | |
1.000 mi = 1.609 km; 1.000 km = 0.621 mi: Concurrency terminus
