= Big Sandy, East Lynn and Guyan Railroad =

American railroad

Overview
- Main region(s): West Virginia
- Dates of operation: 1902–1908
- Predecessor: none
- Successor: Norfolk & Western Railway

Technical
- Track gauge: 4 ft 8 1/2 in (1,435 mm) standard gauge
- Track length: 7.48 mi (12.04 km)

The Big Sandy, East Lynn and Guyan Railroad in West Virginia was incorporated on June 16, 1902.

== History ==
In the 1890s, plans were made for a railroad to connect the Big Sandy River and Guyandotte River. The planned railroad would start at the mouth of Whites Creek on the Big Sandy River in Wayne County, West Virginia and, proceed to the East Fork of Twelvepole Creek, and eventually onward to the Guyandotte River near Logan, in Logan County, West Virginia. The railroad also planned to pass through the town of East Lynn in Wayne County, West Virginia.

The first leg of the railroad was from the town of Wayne to the town of East Lynn. The first trains ran in the fall of 1903. However, the railroad was never completed from the Big Sandy River to the Guyandotte.

The Big Sandy, East Lynn and Guyan Railroad sold all of their rights-of-way to the Norfolk and Western Railway in 1908 and went out of business in 1911. Norfolk Southern Railway trains would continue to operate on the right-of-way up until July 2015, when the last train was sent out. The line served the Rockspring Development, Inc. mine south of East Lynn.
