= National Register of Historic Places listings in Wayne County, West Virginia =

Location of Wayne County in West Virginia

This is a list of the National Register of Historic Places listings in Wayne County, West Virginia.

This is intended to be a complete list of the properties and districts on the National Register of Historic Places in Wayne County, West Virginia, United States. The locations of National Register properties and districts for which the latitude and longitude coordinates are included below, may be seen in an online map.

There are 9 properties listed on the National Register in the county.

This National Park Service list is complete through NPS recent listings posted March 21, 2025.

Contents: Counties in West Virginia

Barbour - Berkeley - Boone - Braxton - Brooke - Cabell - Calhoun - Clay - Doddridge - Fayette - Gilmer - Grant - Greenbrier - Hampshire - Hancock - Hardy - Harrison - Jackson - Jefferson - Kanawha - Lewis - Lincoln - Logan - Marion - Marshall - Mason - McDowell - Mercer - Mineral - Mingo - Monongalia - Monroe - Morgan - Nicholas - Ohio - Pendleton - Pleasants - Pocahontas - Preston - Putnam - Raleigh - Randolph - Ritchie - Roane - Summers - Taylor - Tucker - Tyler - Upshur - Wayne - Webster - Wetzel - Wirt - Wood - Wyoming

== Current listings ==
	Name on the Register	Image	Date listed	Location	City or town	Description
1	Camp Mad Anthony Wayne		December 12, 2002 (#02001531)	2125 Spring Valley Dr. 38°22′04″N 82°30′47″W	Huntington	
2	Dunlow Norfolk & Western Railway Depot		April 5, 2023 (#100008825)	63 Old Railroad Rd. 38°01′14″N 82°25′49″W	Dunlow	
3	First Congregational Church of Ceredo	First Congregational Church of Ceredo	December 20, 2021 (#100005826)	600 C St. 38°23′48″N 82°33′34″W	Ceredo	
4	Fort Gay High School		December 18, 2017 (#100001903)	675 Court St. 38°07′02″N 82°35′40″W	Fort Gay	
5	Joseph S. Miller House	Joseph S. Miller House	March 29, 1989 (#89000180)	748 Beech St. 38°23′59″N 82°34′01″W	Kenova	
6	Z. D. Ramsdell House	Z. D. Ramsdell House	August 18, 1983 (#83003254)	1108 B St. 38°23′49″N 82°33′15″W	Ceredo	
7	Henry and Julia Hoard Stark House		November 13, 2023 (#100009543)	359 B Street; 38°23′52″N 82°33′44″W	Ceredo	
8	Wayne County World War I Memorial		March 28, 2024 (#100010185)	Southwest comer of North Court Street and Hendricks Street; 38°13′17″N 82°26′33″W	Wayne	
9	Wildcat Branch Petroglyphs		July 22, 1979 (#79002603)	Address Restricted	Fort Gay	

== See also ==
- List of National Historic Landmarks in West Virginia
- National Register of Historic Places listings in West Virginia
