= Dunlow, West Virginia =

Unincorporated community in West Virginia, United States

- Town
- Location within the state of West Virginia Dunlow, West Virginia (the United States)
- Coordinates: 38°01′23.33″N 82°25′53.54″W
- Country: United States
- State: West Virginia
- County: Wayne

Area
  - Total: 0.27 sq mi (0.7 km^{2})
  - Land: 23.480 sq mi (60.814 km^{2})
  - Water: 0.00077 sq mi (0.002 km^{2})
- Elevation: 1,102.0 ft (335.89 m)

Population (2000)
  - Total: 1,105
  - Density: 18.17/sq mi (7.02/km^{2})
- Time zone: UTC-5 (Eastern (EST))
  - Summer (DST): UTC-5 (EDT)
- ZIP code: 25511
- Area code: 304

Dunlow is an unincorporated community in southern Wayne County, West Virginia, United States, on Twelvepole Creek. Originally a small settlement called Twelvepole, it was greatly expanded after entrepreneur Jedediah Hotchkiss chose the village for development along the route of the Norfolk & Western Railway (N&W) line that was being laid out to the Ohio River. The town was laid out along the N&W's Ohio Extension in 1892, and was incorporated the same year. The area had plentiful coal deposits that were expected to be exploited. Population in 1892 was about 200, with a school, church, and a 70-room hotel. The town became the headquarters of the Guyandotte Coal Land Association, which administered land transactions for coal-related businesses.

A devastating fire in December 1901 destroyed most of the center of town, which never recovered. The population in 1919 was 75. Coal in the vicinity of Dunlow was found to be unprofitable to mine. The railroad up the West Fork of Twelvepole Creek through Dunlow was shut down in the early 1930s, supplanted by the newer, straighter Big Sandy Line, and what is left of the town is unincorporated.

At the 2000 census, the Dunlow postal district had a population of 1,105. In 2009, the population in zip code 25511 was listed as 961.

Dunlow is noted for its wildlife sightings. There have been several accounts of sightings of black panthers and other jungle animals in Dunlow. A circus train that derailed in the mid-1940s, from which several jungle creatures escaped and were never recovered, is rumored to be the source of these animals.

== Cities and towns located near Dunlow ==
- Breeden (8.2 miles)
- Crum (9.2 miles)
- Genoa (7.3 miles)
- Kiahsville (3.9 miles)
- Ranger (11.3 miles)
- Wilsondale (5.8 miles)
- Cove Gap (6.3 miles)
- Doane (3.4 miles)
- Quaker (4.7 miles)
- Upper Tug, Kentucky (9.0 miles)

== Climate ==
The climate in this area is characterized by hot, humid summers and generally mild to cool winters. According to the Köppen Climate Classification system, Dunlow has a humid subtropical climate, abbreviated "Cfa" on climate maps.

== See also ==
- Dunlow Norfolk & Western Railway Depot, on the National Register of Historic Places
