= Radnor, West Virginia =

- Unincorporated community
- Location within West Virginia Location within the United States
- Coordinates: 38°04′46″N 82°27′24″W
- Country: United States
- State: West Virginia
- County: Wayne
- Elevation: 673 ft (205 m)
- Time zone: UTC-5 (Eastern (EST))
  - Summer (DST): UTC-4 (EDT)
- Area codes: 304 & 681
- GNIS feature ID: 1555434

Radnor is an unincorporated community in Wayne County, West Virginia, United States. Radnor is located on West Virginia Route 152, 10 miles (16 km) south of Wayne.

The community may have been named after the local Radnor (or Ridenour) family.
