= West Virginia Route 152 =

State highway in West Virginia, United States

West Virginia Route 152

Route information
- Maintained by WVDOH
- Length: 44.8 mi (72.1 km)

Major junctions
- South end: US 52 near Crum
- WV 37 from Echo to Wayne
- North end: I-64 / WV 527 in Huntington

Location
- Country: United States
- State: West Virginia
- Counties: Wayne, Cabell

Highway system
- West Virginia State Highway System; Interstate; US; State
← WV 150	→ WV 161

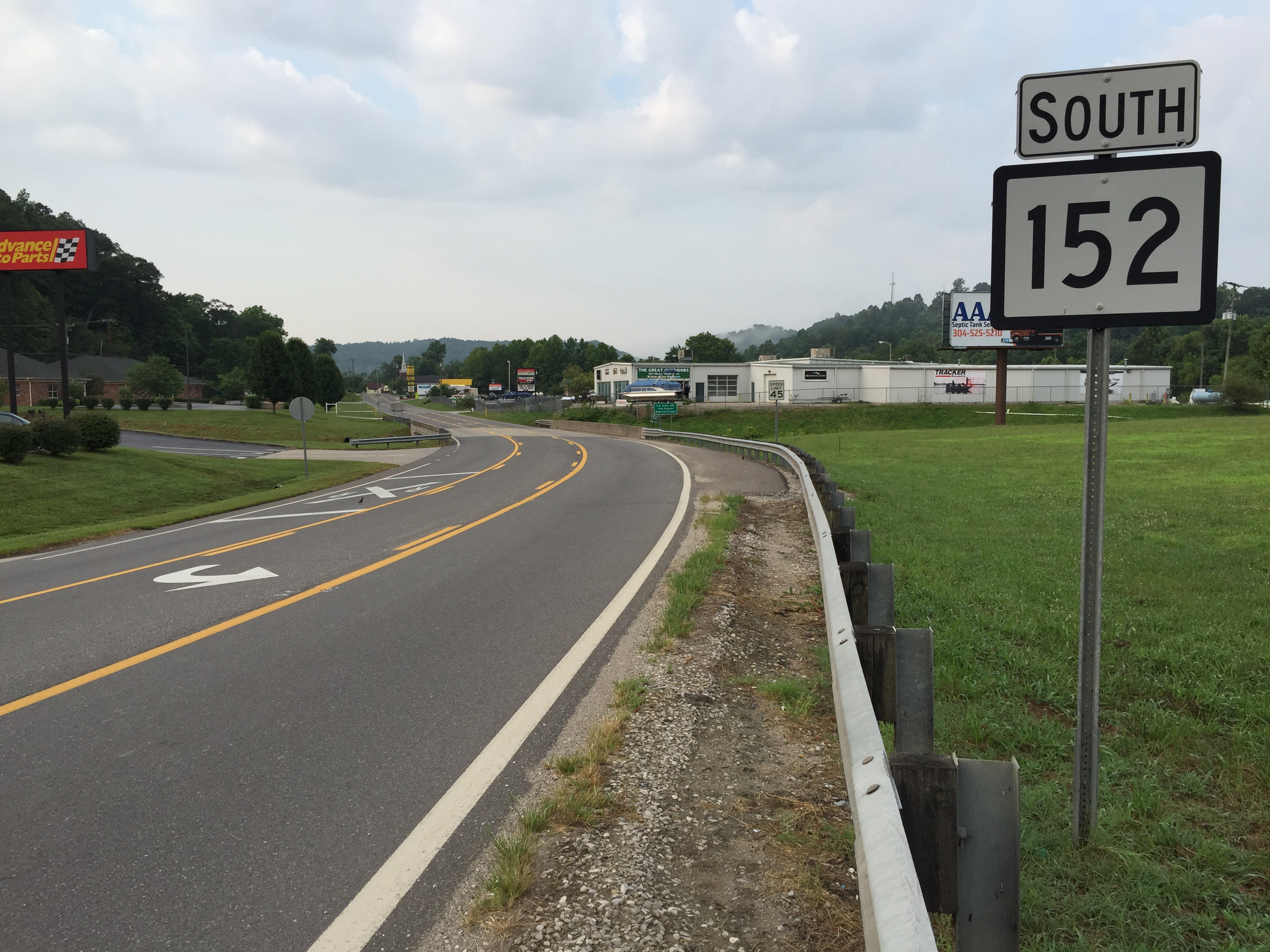
View south along WV 152 at WV 75 in Lavalette

West Virginia Route 152 is a north–south state highway extending from Crum to Huntington, West Virginia. The northern terminus of WV 152 is unusual in that it also serves as the southern terminus of West Virginia Route 527, which continues along the same street as it passes over Interstate 64 at exit 8 (both state routes are indicated on exit signage on the expressway). WV 527 continues along the former routing of U.S. Route 52 through downtown Huntington, West Virginia on its way toward Chesapeake, Ohio. The southern terminus of the route is at US 52 northeast of Crum.

Portions of the roadway south of Wayne run along an old Norfolk and Western Railroad bed. There is an abandoned depot at Dunlow. Under some of the highway bridges, you can find shared abutments with the old railroad crossing.

== History ==
WV 152 was formerly part of U.S. Route 52. The current designation was created in 1979, when US 52 was rerouted a few miles to the west in order to facilitate the construction of a more modern highway along the Tug Fork and Big Sandy River. The West Virginia Department of Transportation redesignated the former segment of US 52 as WV 152 from its internal designation as route 1/52, as it formerly ran between County Route 1 and US 52.

== Major intersections ==
County	Location	mi	km	Destinations	Notes
Wayne				US 52 – Williamson, Huntington	
Wayne	Echo			WV 37 west – Fort Gay	south end of WV 37 overlap
Wayne	Wayne			WV 37 east – East Lynn	north end of WV 37 overlap
Wayne				WV 75 west – Kenova	
Cabell	Huntington			I-64 / WV 527 north – Huntington, Ashland, Charleston	I-64 exit 8
1.000 mi = 1.609 km; 1.000 km = 0.621 mi: Concurrency terminus
