= Armilda, West Virginia =

Unincorporated community in West Virginia, US

Coordinates: 38.183699°N 82.401539°W

Armilda is an unincorporated community located approximately five miles south of the town of Wayne in Wayne County, West Virginia, United States. Armilda was named for the wife of a settler. The one room Armilda Schoolhouse was located there. A Norfolk and Western Railway flag station on the rail line that ran to East Lynn was also once located there. When the East Lynn Lake was under construction in the 1960s, the graves in the immediate area were moved to a large cemetery constructed on the hill overlooking Armilda. The cemetery is named Community Memorial Gardens and is also commonly known as the "government cemetery." Armilda is a part of the Huntington-Ashland Metropolitan Statistical Area (MSA). As of the 2010 census, the MSA had a population of 287,702. New definitions from February 28, 2013 placed the population at 363,000.
