= Fleming, West Virginia =

Unincorporated community in West Virginia, United States

- Unincorporated community
- Location within West Virginia Location within the United States
- Coordinates: 38°05′16″N 82°28′16″W
- Country: United States
- State: West Virginia
- County: Wayne
- Elevation: 686 ft (209 m)
- Time zone: UTC-5 (Eastern (EST))
  - Summer (DST): UTC-4 (EDT)
- Area codes: 304 & 681
- GNIS feature ID: 1549685

Fleming is an unincorporated community in Wayne County, West Virginia, United States. Fleming is located on West Virginia Route 152, 7 miles (11 km) east-southeast of Fort Gay.
