= Missouri Branch, West Virginia =

- Unincorporated community
- Location within West Virginia Location within the United States
- Coordinates: 37°59′54″N 82°24′23″W
- Country: United States
- State: West Virginia
- County: Wayne
- Elevation: 705 ft (215 m)
- Time zone: UTC-5 (Eastern (EST))
  - Summer (DST): UTC-4 (EDT)
- Area codes: 304 & 681
- GNIS feature ID: 1555139

Missouri Branch is an unincorporated community in Wayne County, West Virginia, United States. Missouri Branch is located on West Virginia Route 152, 13 miles (21 km) southeast of Fort Gay.

The community takes its name from nearby Missouri Branch Creek.
