= Sidney, West Virginia =

Sidney
- Unincorporated community
- Interactive map of Sidney
- Coordinates: 38°9′25″N 82°28′22″W
- Country: United States
- State: West Virginia
- County: Wayne
- Elevation: 633 ft (193 m)
- Time zone: UTC-5 (Eastern (EST))
  - Summer (DST): UTC-4 (EDT)
- FIPS code: 1555623

Sidney is an unincorporated community located in Wayne County, West Virginia, south of Echo, WV and north of Genoa, WV.

A variant name was Coleman.
