= Centerville, West Virginia =

Centerville may refer to the following places in the U.S. state of West Virginia:

- Centerville, Tyler County, West Virginia, an unincorporated community
- Centerville, Wayne County, West Virginia, an unincorporated community
- A prior name for the settlement of Rock Cave, West Virginia
