= Glenhayes, West Virginia =

Unincorporated community in West Virginia, United States

- Unincorporated community
- Location within West Virginia Location within the United States
- Coordinates: 38°00′51″N 82°31′17″W
- Country: United States
- State: West Virginia
- County: Wayne
- Elevation: 604 ft (184 m)
- Time zone: UTC-5 (Eastern (EST))
  - Summer (DST): UTC-4 (EDT)
- Area codes: 304 & 681
- GNIS feature ID: 1539466

Glenhayes is an unincorporated community in Wayne County, West Virginia, United States. Glenhayes is located on the Tug Fork and U.S. Route 52, 8.1 miles (13.0 km) southeast of Fort Gay. Glenhayes had a post office, which closed on November 9, 2002.

The community's name is an amalgamation of James K. Glenn and Rutherford B. Hayes, the former a land speculator and the latter the 19th President of the United States.
