= Shoals, West Virginia =

- Unincorporated community
- Location within West Virginia Location within the United States
- Coordinates: 38°19′37″N 82°28′31″W
- Country: United States
- State: West Virginia
- County: Wayne
- Elevation: 568 ft (173 m)
- Time zone: UTC-5 (Eastern (EST))
  - Summer (DST): UTC-4 (EDT)
- ZIP code: 25562
- Area codes: 304 & 681
- GNIS feature ID: 1555615

Shoals is an unincorporated community in Wayne County, West Virginia, United States. Shoals is located on West Virginia Route 75, 6.5 miles (10.5 km) south-southwest of downtown Huntington. Shoals has a post office with ZIP code 25562.

The community was named for a river shoal near the original town site.
