= Gilkerson =

Gilkerson may refer to:

- Gilkerson, West Virginia, an unincorporated community in Wayne County
- John Gilkerson (born 1985), American soccer player

== See also ==
- Gilkeson, a surname
- Gilkerson's Union Giants, an independent Negro semi-pro baseball team
