= Lavalette, West Virginia =

Lavalette
- Census-designated place (CDP)
- Location within the state of West Virginia
- Coordinates: 38°19′22″N 82°26′49″W
- Country: United States
- State: West Virginia
- County: Wayne

Area
  - Total: 2.607 sq mi (6.75 km^{2})
  - Land: 2.607 sq mi (6.75 km^{2})
  - Water: 0 sq mi (0 km^{2})

Population (2020)
  - Total: 932
  - Density: 357/sq mi (138/km^{2})
- Time zone: UTC-5 (Eastern (EST))
  - Summer (DST): UTC-4 (EDT)

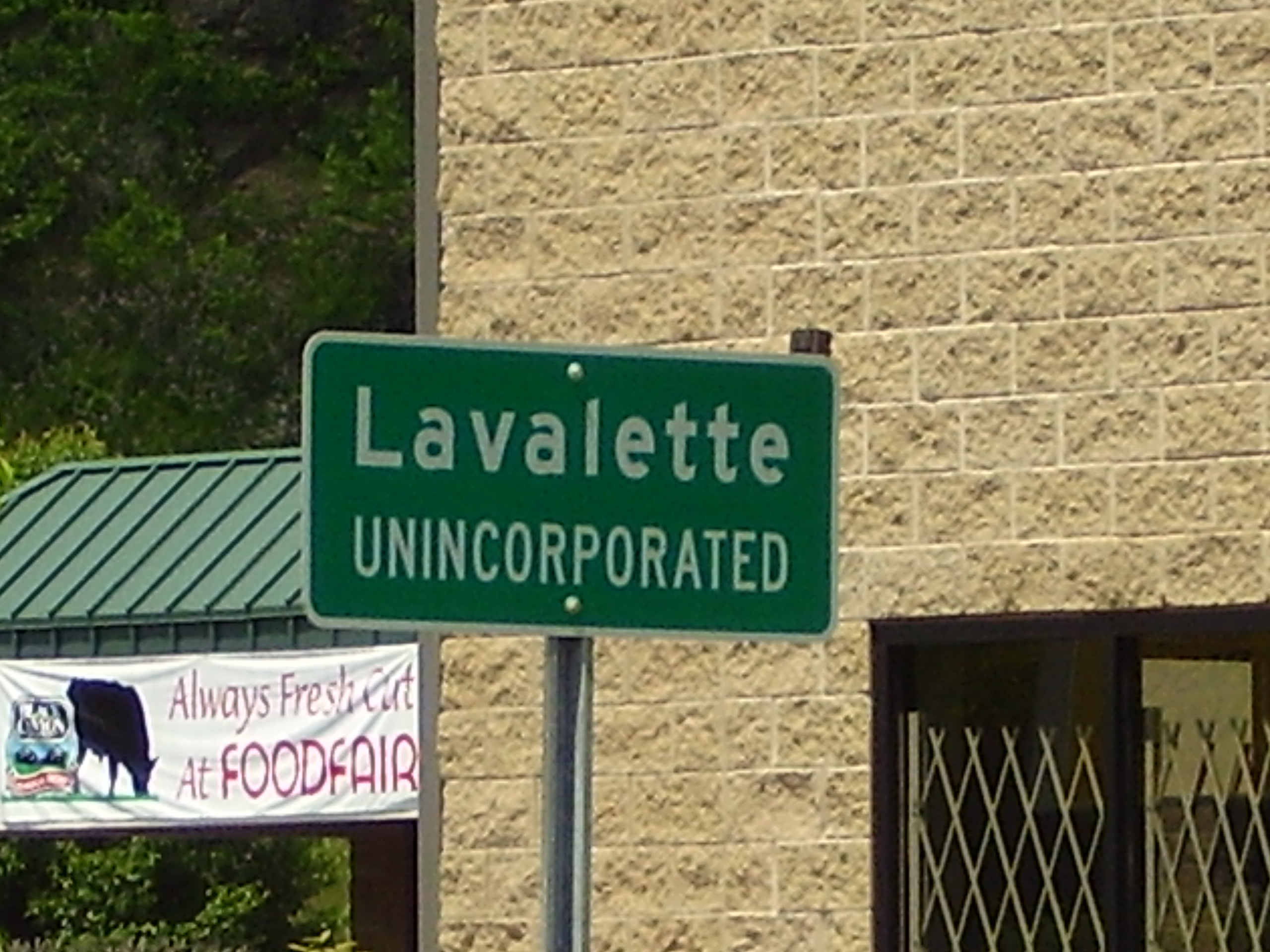
Road sign indicating the northern boundary of Lavalette along West Virginia Route 152.

Lavalette is a census-designated place (CDP) in Wayne County, West Virginia, in the United States. As of the 2020 census, its population was 932 (down from 1,073 at the 2010 census). Lavalette is located at the intersection of West Virginia Route 152 and West Virginia Route 75, eight miles south of Huntington. The town is near Beech Fork Lake, a popular location for boating and fishing, and Twelvepole Creek. Lavalette was named after Lavalette Miller, the daughter of a Norfolk & Western Railway official.

Lavalette is a part of the Huntington-Ashland, WV-KY-OH, Metropolitan Statistical Area. As of the 2010 census, the MSA had a population of 287,702.

Lavalette has two 18-hole public golf courses - Sugarwood Golf Club and Creekside Golf Course. Lavalette also has a paid EMS ambulance service with two emergency response squads and one transport unit. The 35 member volunteer fire department has four engine companies, a rescue boat, and a mobile disaster response trailer.
