= Buffalo Creek, West Virginia =

Unincorporated community in West Virginia, United States

- Unincorporated community
- Location within West Virginia Location within the United States
- Coordinates: 38°21′20″N 82°30′34″W
- Country: United States
- State: West Virginia
- County: Wayne
- Elevation: 548 ft (167 m)
- Time zone: UTC-5 (Eastern (EST))
  - Summer (DST): UTC-4 (EDT)
- Area codes: 304 & 681
- GNIS feature ID: 1536620

Buffalo Creek is an unincorporated community in Wayne County, West Virginia, United States. Buffalo Creek is located on West Virginia Route 75, 6 miles (9.7 km) southwest of Huntington.
