= Crum, West Virginia =

- Census-designated place (CDP)
- Location within the state of West Virginia
- Coordinates: 37°54′20.34″N 82°26′45.53″W
- Country: United States
- State: West Virginia
- County: Wayne

Area
  - Total: 0.510 sq mi (1.32 km^{2})
  - Land: 0.510 sq mi (1.32 km^{2})
  - Water: 0 sq mi (0 km^{2})

Population (2020)
  - Total: 136
  - Density: 267/sq mi (103/km^{2})
- Time zone: UTC-5 (Eastern (EST))
  - Summer (DST): UTC-5 (CDT)
- ZIP code: 25669
- Area code: 304

Crum is a census-designated place (CDP) in southern Wayne County, West Virginia, United States. As of the 2020 census, its population was 136 (down from 182 at the 2010 census). It is the home to Crum Pre K-8 school opened in 2017. It is a part of the Huntington-Ashland Metropolitan Statistical Area (MSA).

== Town information ==
Crum is the home of Silver Creek United Baptist Church (the second oldest church in West Virginia), Crum Separate Baptist Church, Crum Church of Christ, and Crum Missionary Baptist Church. Many other small churches are located in nearby hollows and roads.

U.S. Route 52 runs directly through Crum, as does the Norfolk Southern Railway's Kenova District. The town is bordered on the west by the Tug Fork of the Big Sandy River (also known locally as the Tug River). This river is part of the boundary between West Virginia and Kentucky. A mile section of the future King Coal Highway is built just east of Crum, with access from Silver Creek Rd.

== Demographic information ==
Whites make up 99.2% of the population at 1,537 (note that this is at considerable odds with the 2010 Census population figure of 182), with blacks and other groups at 0.8% with a population of 12. There were 657 households with an average household size of 2.63. The average house value is listed at $52,100, with an average household income of $15,449. The median age of the general population is 35.10 years, with the male median age at 35.60, and the females at 36.20.

== Crum: The Novel ==
Written by former Crum resident Lee Maynard, it is a fictionalized account of life in Crum in the 1950s. When it was released in 1988, the book stirred up hostility in the town as many Crum residents took offense to Maynard's portrayal of Crum, despite the inclusion of a disclaimer at the beginning of the book explaining that the work is fictional except for the town name of "Crum." Still, a few Crum residents claim that characters and incidents in the book are clearly inspired by real-life people and events. Considered a "cult classic" by some, original copies were selling for large amounts on eBay before the book was re-released in 2001 by West Virginia University Press.

== Cities / Towns near Crum, West Virginia ==
- Beauty, Kentucky (10

miles)

- Dunlow (9.2 miles)
- Genoa (9.1 miles)
- Inez, Kentucky (17 miles)
- Kermit (7 miles)
- Kiahsville (12.7 miles)
- River, Kentucky (10.8 miles)
- Tomahawk, Kentucky (25 miles)
- Warfield, Kentucky (8 miles)
- Wilsondale (10 miles)
