= Ardel =

Ardel may refer to:

== Places ==
- Ardel, West Virginia, U.S.

== People ==
=== Given name ===
- Ardel Wray (1907–1983), American screenwriter and story editor
- Ardel (comics) (1912–?), Spanish comics artist, contributor to Maravillas

=== Surname ===
- Henri Ardel (1863–1938), French writer
- Eleanor Ardel Vietti (1927–1962), American physician and missionary

== See also ==
- Ardele Lister, Canadian-American video artist
- Ardal, a city in Iran
