= Stiltner, West Virginia =

Stiltner
- Unincorporated community
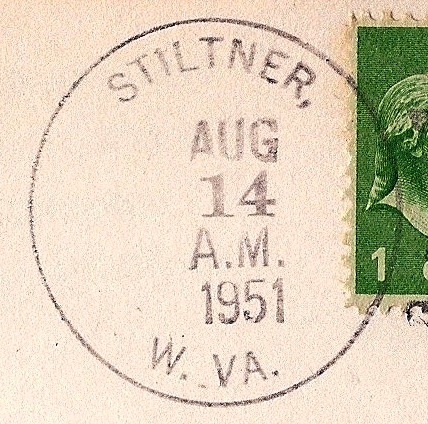
- Postmark from Stiltner West Virginia
- Interactive map of Stiltner
- Coordinates: 38°07′55″N 82°22′50″W
- Country: United States
- State: West Virginia
- County: Wayne
- Elevation: 758 ft (231 m)
- Time zone: UTC-5 (Eastern (EST))
  - Summer (DST): UTC-4 (EDT)
- FIPS code: 1555713

Stiltner was a small unincorporated community that developed at the mouth of Brush Creek, a tributary of Twelvepole Creek, in Wayne County, West Virginia, United States.

In 1969, Stiltner and the surrounding area were permanently submerged under the constructed East Lynn Lake.

Stiltner had a Post Office. A former variant name was Fry; the present name honors the local Stiltner family.
