= Blaze Starr =

American stripper and burlesque star (1932–2015)

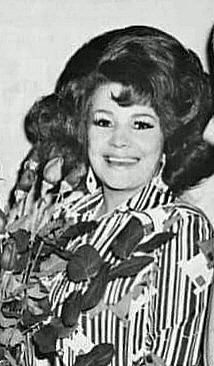
- Starr in 1974
- Born: Fannie Belle Fleming; April 10, 1932; Wayne County, West Virginia, US
- Died: June 15, 2015 (aged 83); Wilsondale, West Virginia, US
- Other name: "The Hottest Blaze in Burlesque"
- Occupations: Stripper, American burlesque star, nude model, gemologist
- Years active: 1950–1983 (stripper); 1956–1989 (actress); 1989–2015 (gemologist)
- Spouse: Carroll Glorioso
- Modeling information
- Hair color: Red

Blaze Starr (born Fannie Belle Fleming; April 10, 1932 – June 15, 2015) was an American stripper and burlesque star. Her vivacious presence and inventive use of stage props earned her the nickname "The Hottest Blaze in Burlesque". She was also known for her affair with Louisiana Governor Earl Kemp Long. Based on her memoir Blaze Starr! My Life as Told to Huey Perry (published in 1974), the 1989 film Blaze told the story of that affair starring Paul Newman as Long and Lolita Davidovich as Starr, with Starr herself acting in a cameo role and as a consultant.

== Early life ==
Starr was born on April 10, 1932, in rural Wayne County, West Virginia, along Twelvepole Creek, (also spelled Twelve Pole Creek) the second eldest of 11 siblings born to Lora (née Evans) and Goodlow Fleming.

Reared in the Newground Hollow (also spelled New Ground Hollow) area of Wilsondale, West Virginia, she left home at either age 14 or 15. She first moved to Logan, West Virginia, working as a carhop, and then from there to Washington D.C., where, according to her autobiography, she was discovered by a promoter while she was employed in a doughnut shop.

She recalled:

I was 15 and working as a waitress at the Mayflower Donut Shop in Washington, D.C., when a man named Red Snyder told me I was pretty and ought to be in show business. I said I had been raised to believe it was sinful to dance, but I could play the guitar. "Good," he said. "I'm going to make you a star." Red said he wanted me to dress up as a cowgirl, play the guitar a little and then strip. I had never heard of striptease before. But Red sweet-talked me and said the girls who did all had to be really beautiful. When you have never even shown your belly button, the thought of stripping is scary. So when I went onstage for the first time in my red-and-white cowgirl outfit, I used my hat to cover myself. After the show I threw up. It wasn't that I thought there was anything wrong with stripping. I was just overwhelmed by the emotion of getting into show business.

Snyder became Fleming's first manager, encouraged her to start stripping, and gave her the stage name Blaze Starr.

== Career ==
Starr moved to Baltimore, where she began performing at the Two O'Clock Club nightclub in 1950. She eventually became its headliner. She rose to national renown after she was profiled in a February 1954 Esquire magazine article, "B-Belles of Burlesque: You Get Strip Tease With Your Beer in Baltimore". The Two O'Clock Club remained her home base, but she began to travel and perform in clubs throughout the country.

Starr's striking red hair, voluptuous figure and on-stage enthusiasm were a large part of her appeal. The theatrical flourishes and unique gimmicks she used in her stage show went beyond established burlesque routines like the fan dance and balloon dance. She often performed with dangerous cats, including a baby black panther.

Her trademark routine was "the exploding couch". As she explained in 1989, "I had finally got my gimmick, a comedy thing where I'm supposed to be getting so worked up that I stretch out on the couch, and — when I push a secret button — smoke starts coming out from like between my legs. Then a fan and a floodlight come on, and you see all these red silk streamers blowing, shaped just like flames, so it looked like the couch had just burst into fire."

Starr was arrested more than once. The first time was in Philadelphia, Pennsylvania, for lewdness, by a young police officer, Frank Rizzo, who would later become that city's police commissioner and mayor. Another time was in New Orleans.

In 1968, Starr bought the Two O'Clock Club on The Block in Baltimore, Maryland, which at the time was valued at 65,000 dollars. She continued to perform in the club. In the early 1980s, Starr made an appearance at the Mitchell Brothers' O'Farrell Theatre in San Francisco.

== Relationship with Louisiana Governor Earl Long ==
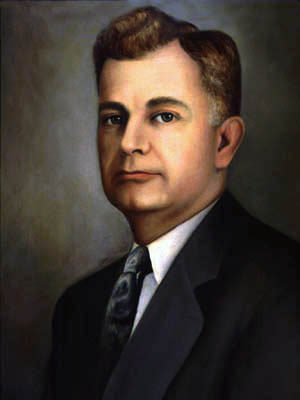
The official 1939 portrait of Louisiana Governor Earl Long

In the late 1950s, while briefly working at the Sho-Bar on Bourbon Street in the French Quarter of New Orleans, Starr began a long-term affair with then-governor Earl Long. Starr was in the process of divorcing her husband, club owner Carroll Glorioso, and Long was married to the state's first lady, known colloquially as "Miz Blanche". Their open affair lasted from 1959 until Long's death in September 1960. During that time, Starr claims she also had an affair with then-senator John F. Kennedy at Long's encouragement, who told her to be "nice" to "your future president".

== Media appearances ==
Two of Starr's performances, including the combustible sofa, are among the burlesque routines featured in the 1956 compilation film Buxom Beautease, produced and directed by Irving Klaw. Director Doris Wishman's 1962 film Blaze Starr Goes Nudist, a nudie-sexploitation film, features Starr's one lead movie role. As the title suggests, she plays herself. The film is also known as Blaze Starr Goes Back to Nature, Blaze Starr Goes Wild, Blaze Starr the Original, and Busting Out.

Diane Arbus photographed Starr in 1964. The photo "Blaze Starr at home" was included in the book and traveling exhibit Diane Arbus: Family Albums.

The 1989 movie Blaze recounted the story of her and Long's relationship. The film was directed by Ron Shelton, adapted by him from Starr's memoir Blaze Starr: My Life as Told to Huey Perry (1974), and starred Lolita Davidovich as Starr and Paul Newman as Long. Starr herself appeared in a cameo role and acted as consultant, earning four percent of the film's profits.

Some of Starr's costumes and other memorabilia have been displayed at the Museum of Sex in New York City and the Burlesque Hall of Fame in Las Vegas.

== Retirement and personal life ==
Journalist Frank Lovece wrote in 1989 that "Starr ... gave up stripping six years ago to become a gemologist and make and sell jewelry. Each holiday season, at the Carrolltowne Mall here in the Baltimore suburbs, she is a local celebrity selling earrings, bracelets and necklaces fashioned from the gemstones and crystals she collects the rest of the year."

Starr was a first cousin of singer Molly O'Day.

== Death ==
Starr died June 15, 2015, either at her home in Wilsondale, West Virginia, or at a hospital in nearby Williamson (sources vary). She was 83 years old. She had been worried about the health of her dog, whom she adopted as a stray. One of her sisters claimed the stress, along with a "severe heart condition", killed her. Her dog died hours later.
