= Panama Red (musician) =

American singer-songwriter (1945–2021)

Danny Finley, known professionally as Panama Red, (April 15, 1945 – April 29, 2021) was an American musician and songwriter who was a member of the Kinky Friedman and the Texas Jew Boys band.

== Early life and education ==
Finley was born in East Lynn, West Virginia in 1945. In 1963, he enlisted in the US Army and studied at the US Army Information School at Fort Slocum in New York.

== Career ==
Between 1963 and 1964, Finley was a stringer in South Korea for Pacific Stars and Stripes. He worked as a feature writer for the United Nations Command magazine Friends of Freedom in 1964 and 1965. After his honorable discharge, Finley moved to San Francisco.

In 1966, Finley left San Francisco for St. Petersburg, Florida, where he played guitar for several bands and performed as a solo folk singer, notably at the Beaux Arts Coffeehouse in Pinellas Park. In 1967, Finley moved to New York's Lower East Side; for six months, he managed a coffeehouse near Tompkins Square Park.

In 1967, Finley returned to Florida, becoming a partner in a head shop in Clearwater. He then became a member of Bethlehem Asylum, a fusion band with two recordings on Ampex records, "Commit Yourself" and "Bethlehem Asylum" in 1970 and 1971. In 1971, Finley moved to Nashville, Tennessee. While there, he became Billy Joe Shaver's guitar player. Finley co-wrote with Shaver the song "Bottom Dollar" and appeared on Shaver's record Old Five and Dimers. In 1972 Finley returned to Florida to study music merchandising at the University of Miami. He left college after one semester to return to Nashville and work again with Shaver.

While in Nashville, Finley met Richard "Kinky" Friedman. Finley then played guitar on the Friedman record Sold American. Finley joined the Kinky Friedman and The Texas Jewboys band in New York City, appearing at Max's Kansas City. He then collaborated on Friedman's eponymous ABC album, written in New York City, Austin, Texas, and Mexico. The album was recorded in Nashville (with Willie Nelson as producer) and in Hollywood (with Steve Barri as producer), and released in 1974. Between tours with the Texas Jewboys, Finley worked as a recording musician in Nashville.

Finley left the Jewboys in 1975 and began performing on his own as The Legendary Panama Red. From 1976 to 1979 he toured with his band Montezuma's Revenge. The band performed at the Lone Star Cafe in New York City, the Armadillo World Headquarters in Austin, the Horseshoe Tavern in Toronto and at the Old Mill in Mill Valley, California. After the tour, Finley worked periodically with Felix Pappalardi.

In 1982, Finley put aside his musical career to become a carpenter. He then studied computer science at Miami Dade College in 1982 and 1983. In 1986, Finley enrolled as a radiography student at Northern New Mexico College. While a student there, he edited portions of a radiologic physics textbook, Radiologic Science for Technologists, Bushong, 4th Edition. Finley graduated with a GPA of 3.89 and is a member of Phi Theta Kappa. He also attended the University of New Mexico, majoring in journalism. Between 1990 and 1993, Finley worked at the San Francisco VA Medical Center.

In 1993, Finley resumed his music career. He performed and lived in Nevada City, California, for a while, then moved to Seattle. In 1999, Finley moved to Amsterdam, returning to the United States in 2001. Finley produced two albums HomeGrown and Choice Buds. He performed in venues as a solo artist and backing guitarist in the United States, Norway, Sweden, United Kingdom, France and the Netherlands.

Finley lived in Rockvale, Tennessee.

He is credited by etymologist Barry Popik with the first use of the rhyming phrase "Lost in Austin" (1976).

== Death ==
Danny Finley died in St. Petersburg, Florida, on April 29, 2021. Finley, whose stage name since the early 1970s was Panama Red, is interred at the Veterans Administration National Cemetery at Bay Pines. He is survived by his wife Peppermint Patty, also known as the actress Pat Finn-Lee.

== Albums as featured performer ==
- 1970: Commit Yourself (w/ Bethlehem Asylum)
- 1971: Bethlehem Asylum (w/ Bethlehem Asylum)
- 2000: HomeGrown
- 2005: Choice Buds
- 2019: The Legendary Panama Red with Montezumas Revenge: The Lost Sessions From Nashville: 1977
