= Bowen, West Virginia =

Unincorporated community in West Virginia, United States

Bowen
- Unincorporated community
- Location within the state of West Virginia Bowen (the United States)
- Coordinates: 38°18′22″N 82°20′36″W
- Country: United States
- State: West Virginia
- County: Wayne
- Elevation: 597 ft (182 m)
- Time zone: UTC-5 (Eastern (EST))
  - Summer (DST): UTC-4 (EDT)
- GNIS ID: 1549604

Bowen is an unincorporated community located in Wayne County, West Virginia, United States.
