= Bethesda, West Virginia =

Unincorporated community in West Virginia, United States

Bethesda
- Unincorporated community
- Location within the state of West Virginia Bethesda (the United States)
- Coordinates: 38°11′22″N 82°25′22″W
- Country: United States
- State: West Virginia
- County: Wayne
- Elevation: 633 ft (193 m)
- Time zone: UTC-5 (Eastern (EST))
  - Summer (DST): UTC-4 (EDT)
- GNIS ID: 1553876

Bethesda is an unincorporated community located in Wayne County, West Virginia, United States.
