= First Congregational Church of Ceredo =

- U.S. National Register of Historic Places
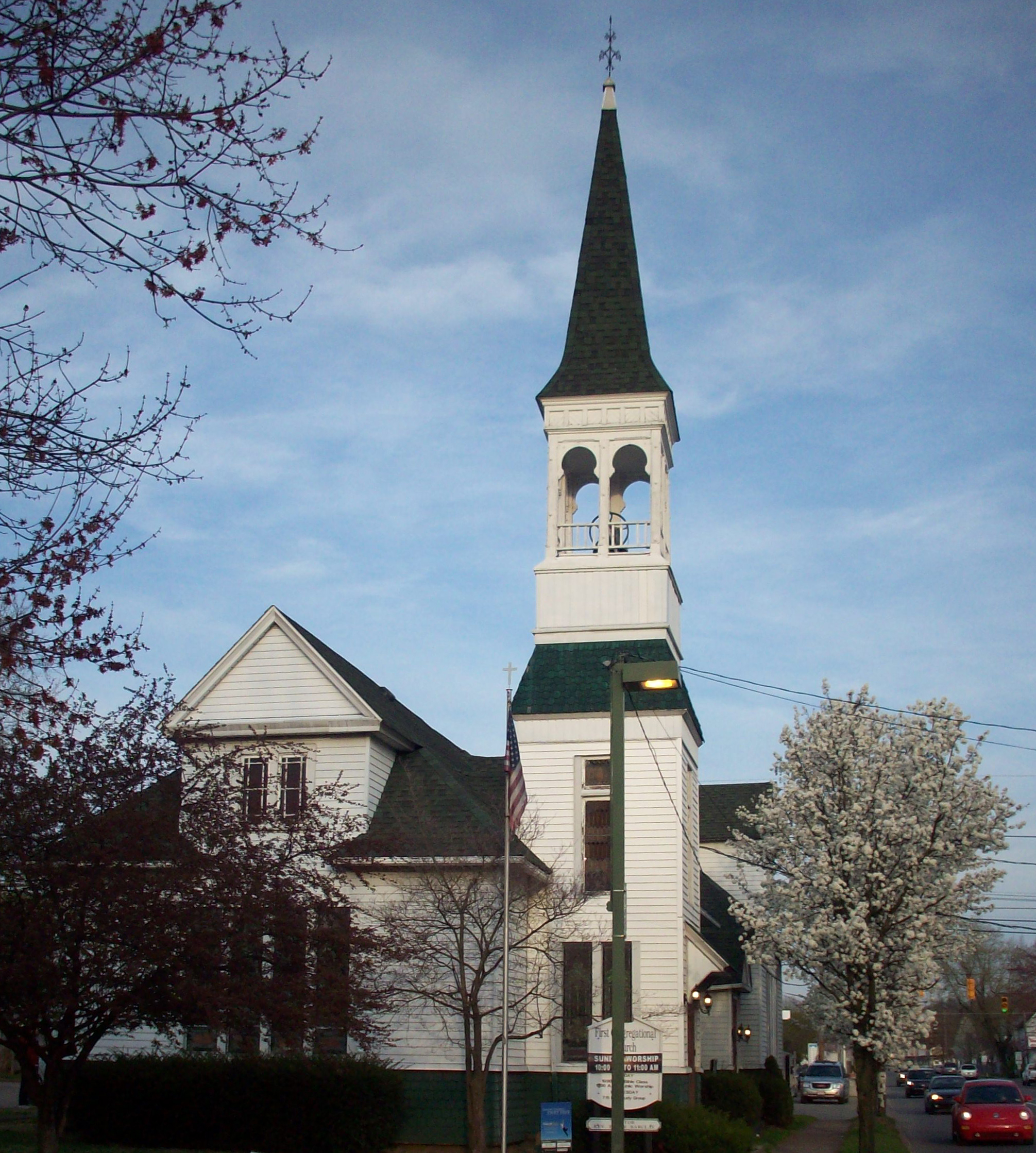
- The First Congregational Church of Ceredo in 2009.
- Location: 600 C St., Ceredo, West Virginia 25507
- Coordinates: 38°23′48″N 82°33′34″W
- Built: 1886
- Architectural style: Classical Revival
- NRHP reference No.: 100005826
- Added to NRHP: 2021

The First Congregational Church of Ceredo is a tall one-story, stone foundation church. It was built in 1886, with Late Victorian architecture that sits one block west of main street.

It was listed on the National Register of Historic Places in 2021.

== See also ==
- National Register of Historic Places listings in Wayne County, West Virginia
