= Stonecoal, West Virginia =

- Unincorporated community
- Location within West Virginia Location within the United States
- Coordinates: 37°53′00″N 82°25′04″W
- Country: United States
- State: West Virginia
- County: Wayne
- Elevation: 630 ft (190 m)
- Time zone: UTC-5 (Eastern (EST))
  - Summer (DST): UTC-4 (EDT)
- Area codes: 304 & 681
- GNIS feature ID: 1547462

Stonecoal is an unincorporated community in Wayne County, West Virginia, United States. Stonecoal is located on the Tug Fork and U.S. Route 52, 2.8 miles (4.5 km) north of Kermit.
