= Saltpetre, West Virginia =

Saltpetre
- Unincorporated community
- Interactive map of Saltpetre
- Coordinates: 38°4′55″N 82°32′51″W
- Country: United States
- State: West Virginia
- County: Wayne
- Elevation: 676 ft (206 m)
- Time zone: UTC-5 (Eastern (EST))
  - Summer (DST): UTC-4 (EDT)
- FIPS code: 1555558

Saltpetre is an unincorporated community located in Wayne County, West Virginia, United States.

The community takes its name from the local saltpetre manufacturing industry.
