= Brabant, West Virginia =

Unincorporated community in West Virginia, United States

Brabant
- Unincorporated community
- Location within the state of West Virginia Brabant (the United States)
- Coordinates: 38°6′55″N 82°19′3″W
- Country: United States
- State: West Virginia
- County: Wayne
- Magisterial district: Stonewall
- Census tract: 209
- Elevation: 686 ft (209 m)
- Time zone: UTC-5 (Eastern (EST))
  - Summer (DST): UTC-4 (EDT)

Brabant is an unincorporated community in Wayne County, West Virginia, United States. It lies on Lick Creek, east of where it enters East Lynn Lake at West Virginia Route 37.
