= Nestlow, West Virginia =

Nestlow
- Unincorporated community
- Interactive map of Nestlow
- Coordinates: 38°10′32″N 82°17′1″W
- Country: United States
- State: West Virginia
- County: Wayne
- Elevation: 797 ft (243 m)
- Time zone: UTC-5 (Eastern (EST))
  - Summer (DST): UTC-4 (EDT)
- FIPS code: 1549848

Nestlow is an unincorporated community located in Wayne County, West Virginia, United States.
