= Mineral Springs, West Virginia =

Mineral Springs
- Unincorporated community
- Interactive map of Mineral Springs
- Coordinates: 38°7′23″N 82°34′57″W
- Country: United States
- State: West Virginia
- County: Wayne
- Elevation: 564 ft (172 m)
- Time zone: UTC-5 (Eastern (EST))
  - Summer (DST): UTC-4 (EDT)
- FIPS code: 1555135

Mineral Springs is an unincorporated community located in Wayne County, West Virginia, United States.

Northwest for about four miles north, both along and off US Route 52, are a string of smaller hamlets, including Hewlet.
