= Hubbardstown, West Virginia =

Hubbardstown
- Unincorporated community
- Interactive map of Hubbardstown
- Coordinates: 38°11′38″N 82°35′55″W
- Country: United States
- State: West Virginia
- County: Wayne
- Elevation: 591 ft (180 m)
- Time zone: UTC-5 (Eastern (EST))
  - Summer (DST): UTC-4 (EDT)
- FIPS code: 1549752

Hubbardstown is an unincorporated community located in Wayne County, West Virginia, United States.
