= Dunlow station =

- Dunlow Norfolk & Western Railway Depot
- U.S. National Register of Historic Places
- Location within West Virginia Location within the United States
- Location: 63 Old Railroad Road, Dunlow, West Virginia
- Coordinates: 38°01′14″N 82°25′49″W
- Built: 1891
- Architectural style: Vernacular architecture
- NRHP reference No.: 100008825
- Added to NRHP: April 5, 2023

The Dunlow Norfolk & Western Railway Depot is a historic railroad depot in the small community of Dunlow, West Virginia, located along the former route of the Norfolk and Western Railway's Ohio Extension line.

== History ==
The depot was one of several passenger and freight depots built to serve communities along the Norfolk and Western (N&W) line. Locally called the Twelvepole Line or the Tadpole Line, the route followed Twelvepole Creek to Kenova on the Ohio River. Work on the Dunlow station was begun to the N&W's specifications in September 1891 by the J.H. Millender Lumber Company of Ceredo, at a cost of $1250. Work was complete by December of that year, and the first train arrived on December 13. The town itself was not organized until 1892, supplanting the village of Twelvepole. The community became the headquarters for the Guyandotte Coal Land Association, which administered land transactions for coal-related businesses.

The Twelvepole Line proved to be unsatisfactory in use. The curving single-track line lacked capacity, and was replaced by the Big Sandy Line from 1902 to 1904, which was doubled in 1923–25. Coal in the vicinity of Dunlow was found to be unprofitable to mine. A December 1901 fire had destroyed much of the center of Dunlow, which never recovered. In 1932 the railroad petitioned to abandon the line, and on September 1, 1933, the last train passed Dunlow, and the tracks were removed by December.

The depot was sold, and probably became a residence. It was vacant by 1995, and remained so by 2017.

== Description ==
The depot is a simple one-story frame structure on Old Railroad Road, which follows the track of the former railroad. The frame board-and-batten structure is 49 feet (15 m) long and 24 feet (7.3 m) wide. Originally set on sandstone piers, the foundation was replaced with brick and concrete block. A plain gable metal roof has a single cross gable on the side facing the road, with decorative gable framing. The name DUNLOW is painted on each end gable. The railroad platforms have been removed or cut back. Windows are double-hung sashes.

The interior consists of four rooms. There are two passenger waiting rooms on the north end of the building. An office and ticket space occupies the center of the building, with a bayed window facing west under the side gable. The southern half of the building is the freight room, with large doors on the east, west and south sides. All of the rooms have wood floors. The office and waiting rooms have beaded paneling on the walls and ceilings. The freight room is unfinished, with exposed wall sheathing and open rafters.

The Dunlow Depot was placed on the National Register of Historic Places on April 5, 2023. A community museum has been proposed for the building.
