= Gilkeson =

Gilkeson is a surname. Notable people with the surname include:

- Adlai H. Gilkeson (1893–1959), United States Air Force general
- Henry Bell Gilkeson (1850–1921), American lawyer, politician, school administrator, and banker

== See also ==
- Gilkerson (disambiguation)
