= Tripp, West Virginia =

Tripp
- Unincorporated community
- Interactive map of Tripp
- Coordinates: 37°55′30″N 82°28′47″W
- Country: United States
- State: West Virginia
- County: Wayne
- Elevation: 607 ft (185 m)
- Time zone: UTC-5 (Eastern (EST))
  - Summer (DST): UTC-4 (EDT)
- FIPS code: 1558762

Tripp is an unincorporated community located in Wayne County, West Virginia, United States.
