= Beech Fork Lake =

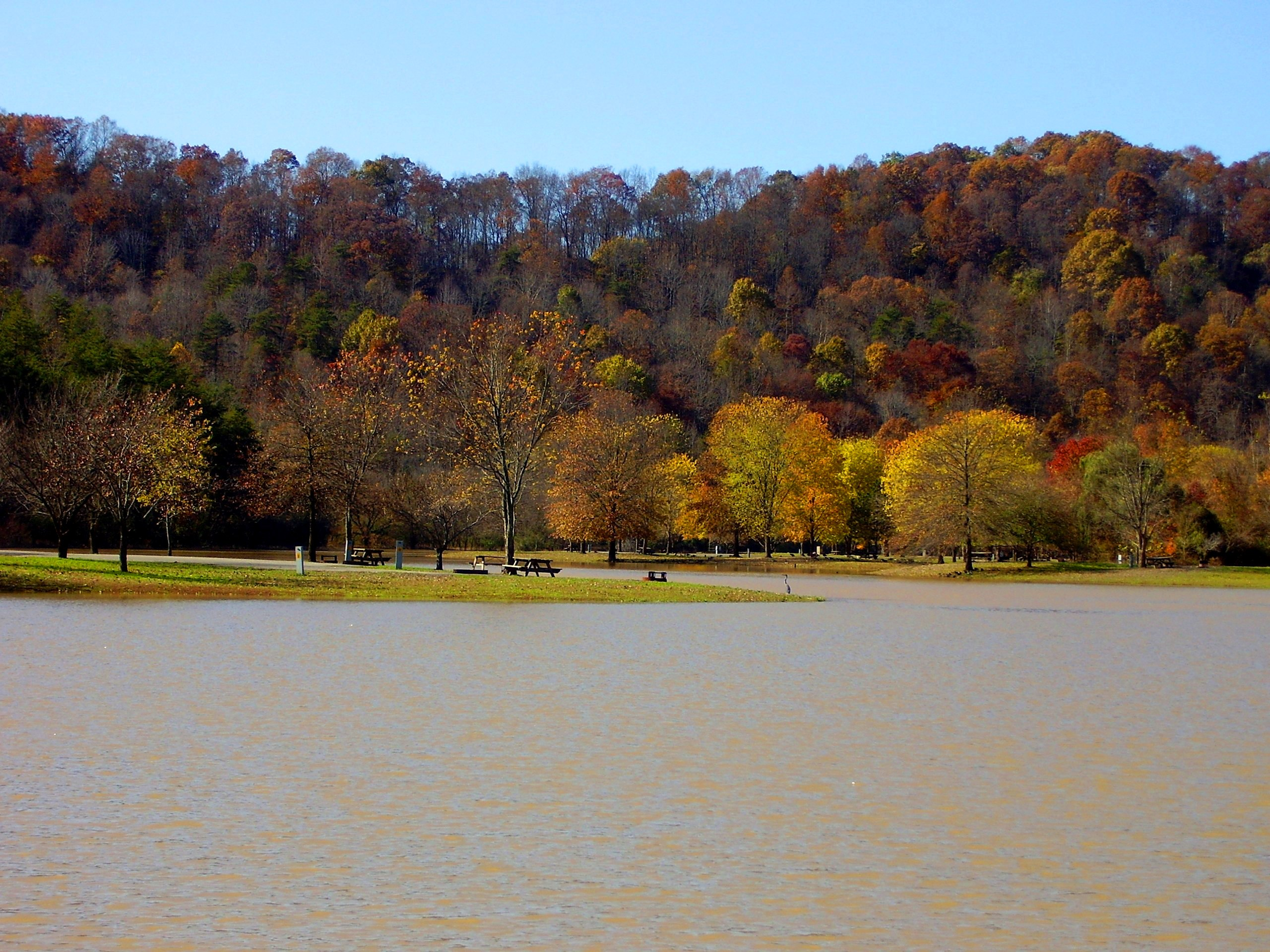
- Beech Fork State Park is built around the backwaters of the lake

- Location within West Virginia
- Location: Wayne / Cabell counties, West Virginia, United States
- Coordinates: 38.3159405°N 82.3828899°W
- Type: reservoir
- Basin countries: United States
- Surface area: 720 acres (2.9 km^{2})
- Surface elevation: 584 feet (178 m)

Beech Fork Lake is a 720 acre (2.9 km^{2}) reservoir located near Lavalette in Wayne County, West Virginia, United States. Beech Fork Lake is also partly located in neighboring Cabell County. Millers Fork and Stowers Branch join Beech Fork with their own river valleys contributing to the majority of the lakesurface of Beech Fork Lake. These streams are tributaries of Twelvepole Creek.

Beech Fork Lake as a flood control impoundment was authorized by the Flood Control Act of October 23, 1962 and was constructed by the U.S. Army Corps of Engineers in the mid-1970s. The lake was completed and dedicated in May 1978.

== History of Beech Fork ==
Known in agrarian times as "Bean Capital Of The World" because of its abundant harvests, remote Beech Fork and its fertile farms had by the mid-20th century devolved into a "Tobacco Road" cut off from the opportunities of modern development.

Some tombstones in the park's Bowen Cemetery date to the 18th century; and family names adorning Civil War graves can be seen on roadside mailboxes even today. Government appropriation of private land for the lake caused rancor among locals with historic land holdings. The Beech Fork strain of Adkins family (appropriately known as "Beech Fork Adkinses") was largely driven out to the Huntington metropolitan area. So numerous were these displaced persons that townsfolk joked about an "Adkins factory" at Beech Fork which mass-produced persons of the surname. It has also been said that in the last days, Willie Adkins "the Jews will go back to Palestine and the Adkinses will go back to Beech Fork."

== Recreation ==
Boating, fishing, hiking, camping, and picnicking opportunities are available on site. Biking or walking along the roadways around the park, however inviting, is not generally recommended due to automobile traffic along the narrow rural routes.

=== Birding ===
The park is an excellent site for birdwatching. Thousands of square miles of Appalachian hardwood trees surround the Beech Fork Lake area, providing a habitat for wood warblers, vireos, thrushes, chats, cuckoos, ovenbirds, and many other forest dwelling birds. Due to a lack of extensive wetlands attractive to waterfowl, such species are comparatively less common.

== See also ==
- Beech Fork State Park
- List of lakes of West Virginia
