= Stepptown, West Virginia =

Stepptown
- Unincorporated community
- Interactive map of Stepptown
- Coordinates: 37°51′14″N 82°25′0″W
- Country: United States
- State: West Virginia
- County: Wayne
- Elevation: 623 ft (190 m)
- Time zone: UTC-5 (Eastern (EST))
  - Summer (DST): UTC-4 (EDT)
- FIPS code: 1555709

Stepptown is an unincorporated community located in Wayne County, West Virginia, United States.
