= Wayne County, West Virginia =

County in West Virginia, United States

- County
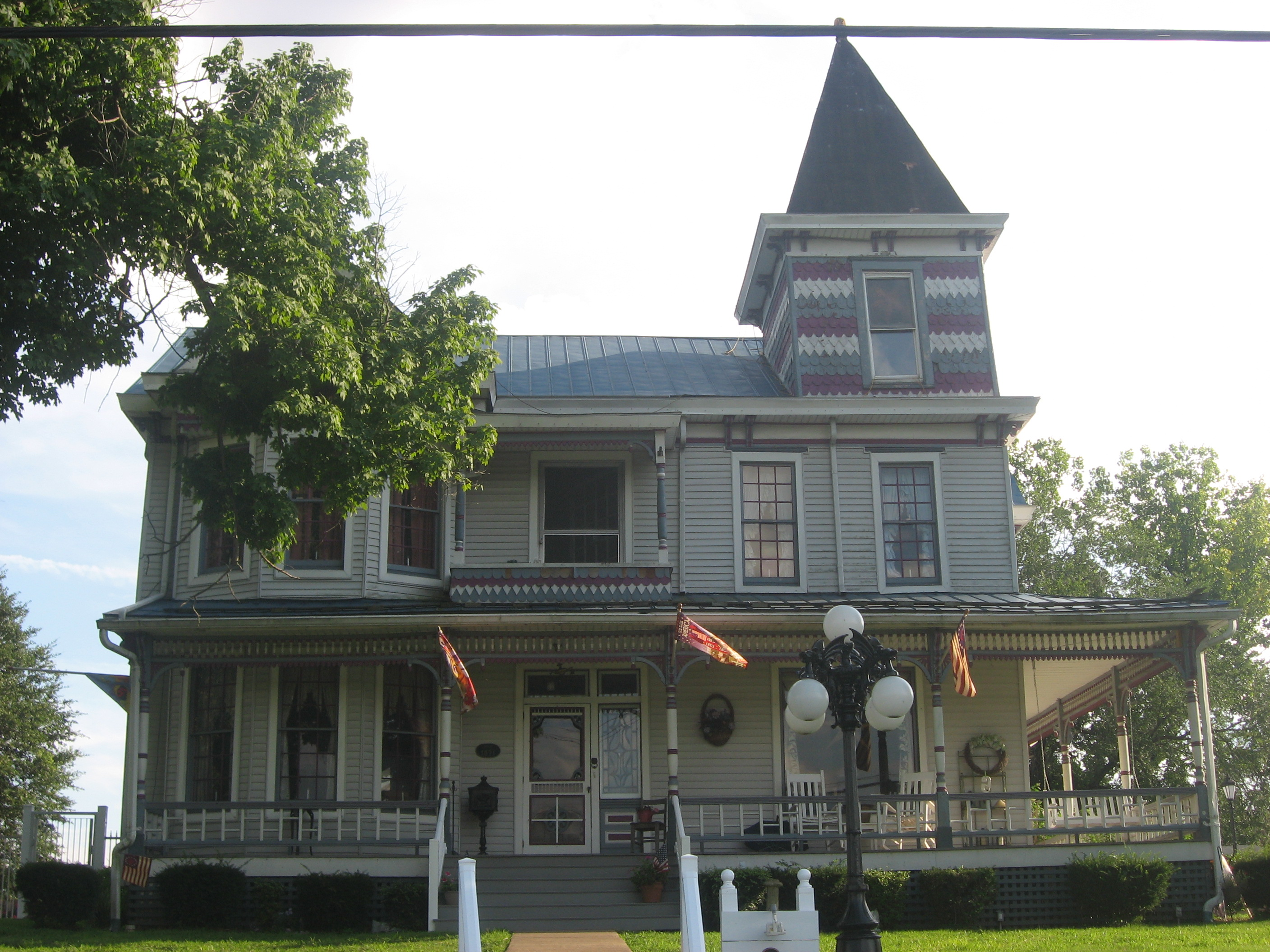
- Joseph S. Miller House at Kenova.

- Seal

- Location within the U.S. state of West Virginia
- Coordinates: 38°09′N 82°26′W
- Country: United States
- State: West Virginia
- Founded: January 18, 1842
- Named for: Anthony Wayne
- Seat: Wayne
- Largest city: Kenova

Area
  - Total: 512 sq mi (1,330 km^{2})
  - Land: 506 sq mi (1,310 km^{2})
  - Water: 6.1 sq mi (16 km^{2}) 1.2%

Population (2020)
  - Total: 38,982
  - Estimate (2025): 37,309 ▼
  - Density: 77.0/sq mi (29.7/km^{2})
- Time zone: UTC−5 (Eastern)
  - Summer (DST): UTC−4 (EDT)
- Congressional district: 1st
- Website: www.waynecountywv.org

Wayne County is the westernmost county in the U.S. state of West Virginia. As of the 2020 census, the population was 38,982. Its county seat is Wayne. The county was founded in 1842 and named for General "Mad" Anthony Wayne. Wayne County is part of the Huntington–Ashland, WV–KY–OH Metropolitan Statistical Area.

== History ==
Wayne County, West Virginia was originally Wayne County, Virginia, which was created from part of Cabell County in 1842. The county was named for General "Mad" Anthony Wayne.

=== Settlement ===
Due to the constant threat of Indian attack, there were no European settlers in the area that became Wayne County until after 1794. The area was made safe for European settlers in 1794 through the defeat of the Shawnee at the Battle of Fallen Timbers by General "Mad" Anthony Wayne.

When the first permanent European settlers came to Wayne County around the year 1800, the area was part of Kanawha County. Most of the original pioneer settlers were self-sufficient farmers. They raised their own food, sheep for wool clothing, and made their buildings, furnishings and tools out of the surrounding forest. A few trading posts provided the manufactured goods the pioneers could not make for themselves. Later, grist mills at Wayne, Dickson, south of East Lynn and at Lavalette ground their corn into meal and their wheat into flour.

On June 20, 1863, at the height of the Civil War, Wayne was one of fifty Virginia counties that were admitted to the Union as the state of West Virginia. Later that year, the counties were divided into civil townships, with the intention of encouraging local government. This proved impractical in the heavily rural state, and in 1872 the townships were converted into magisterial districts. Wayne County was divided into five districts: Butler, Ceredo, Grant, Lincoln, and Union. A sixth district, Stonewall, was formed from part of Grant District in 1878. In the 1920s, Westmoreland was created as the county's seventh magisterial district. Grant District was discontinued between 1960 and 1970, followed by Lincoln in the 1980s.

== Geography ==
According to the United States Census Bureau, the county has a total area of 512 square miles (1,330 km^{2}), of which 506 square miles (1,310 km^{2}) is land and 6.1 square miles (16 km^{2}) (1.2%) is water.

=== Rivers and lakes ===
- Ohio River
- Big Sandy River
- Twelvepole Creek
- Beech Fork Lake
- East Lynn Lake
- Tug Fork

=== Major highways ===
- Interstate 64
- I-73 (future)
- I-74 (future)
- U.S. Route 52
- U.S. Route 60
- West Virginia Route 37
- West Virginia Route 152
- West Virginia Route 75

=== Adjacent counties ===
- Lawrence County, Ohio (north)
- Cabell County (northeast)
- Lincoln County (east)
- Mingo County (southeast)
- Martin County, Kentucky (south)
- Lawrence County, Kentucky (west)
- Boyd County, Kentucky (northwest)

Wayne County is one of three counties (along with Apache County, Arizona and Cook County, Illinois) to border two counties of the same name, neither of which are in the same state as the county itself (Lawrence County, Ohio and Lawrence County, Kentucky).

== Demographics ==
Historical population
Census	Pop.	Note	%±
1850	4,760		—
1860	6,747		41.7%
1870	7,852		16.4%
1880	14,739		87.7%
1890	18,652		26.5%
1900	23,619		26.6%
1910	24,081		2.0%
1920	26,012		8.0%
1930	31,206		20.0%
1940	35,566		14.0%
1950	38,696		8.8%
1960	38,977		0.7%
1970	37,581		−3.6%
1980	46,021		22.5%
1990	41,636		−9.5%
2000	42,903		3.0%
2010	42,481		−1.0%
2020	38,982		−8.2%
2025 (est.)	37,309	▼	−4.3%
U.S. Decennial Census; 1790–1960 1900–1990; 1990–2000 2010–2020

=== 2020 census ===
As of the 2020 census, the county had a population of 38,982. Of the residents, 21.7% were under the age of 18 and 20.8% were 65 years of age or older; the median age was 43.7 years. For every 100 females there were 97.0 males, and for every 100 females age 18 and over there were 94.2 males.

The racial makeup of the county was 95.8% White, 0.4% Black or African American, 0.1% American Indian and Alaska Native, 0.2% Asian, 0.3% from some other race, and 3.1% from two or more races. Hispanic or Latino residents of any race comprised 0.8% of the population.

There were 16,088 households in the county, of which 28.0% had children under the age of 18 living with them and 27.4% had a female householder with no spouse or partner present. About 28.9% of all households were made up of individuals and 13.8% had someone living alone who was 65 years of age or older.

There were 18,150 housing units, of which 11.4% were vacant. Among occupied housing units, 75.1% were owner-occupied and 24.9% were renter-occupied. The homeowner vacancy rate was 1.7% and the rental vacancy rate was 9.0%.

Wayne County, West Virginia – Racial and ethnic composition Note: the US Census treats Hispanic/Latino as an ethnic category. This table excludes Latinos from the racial categories and assigns them to a separate category. Hispanics/Latinos may be of any race.
Race / Ethnicity (NH = Non-Hispanic)	Pop 2000	Pop 2010	Pop 2020	% 2000	% 2010	% 2020
White alone (NH)	42,210	41,706	37,199	98.38%	98.18%	95.43%
Black or African American alone (NH)	53	74	168	0.12%	0.17%	0.43%
Native American or Alaska Native alone (NH)	98	106	53	0.23%	0.25%	0.14%
Asian alone (NH)	86	72	83	0.20%	0.17%	0.21%
Pacific Islander alone (NH)	4	4	10	0.01%	0.01%	0.03%
Other race alone (NH)	17	6	56	0.04%	0.01%	0.14%
Mixed race or Multiracial (NH)	233	295	1,094	0.54%	0.69%	2.81%
Hispanic or Latino (any race)	202	218	319	0.47%	0.51%	0.82%
Total	42,903	42,481	38,982	100.00%	100.00%	100.00%

=== 2010 census ===
As of the 2010 United States census, there were 42,481 people, 17,347 households, and 12,128 families living in the county. The population density was 84.0 inhabitants per square mile (32.4/km^{2}). There were 19,227 housing units at an average density of 38.0 per square mile (14.7/km^{2}). The racial makeup of the county was 98.6% white, 0.3% American Indian, 0.2% black or African American, 0.2% Asian, 0.1% from other races, and 0.8% from two or more races. Those of Hispanic or Latino origin made up 0.5% of the population. In terms of ancestry, 18.1% were Irish, 16.9% were English, 13.0% were American, and 11.8% were German.

Of the 17,347 households, 30.9% had children under the age of 18 living with them, 53.2% were married couples living together, 11.7% had a female householder with no husband present, 30.1% were non-families, and 26.4% of all households were made up of individuals. The average household size was 2.43 and the average family size was 2.92. The median age was 41.3 years.

The median income for a household in the county was $35,079 and the median income for a family was $44,886. Males had a median income of $40,233 versus $25,765 for females. The per capita income for the county was $18,410. About 16.4% of families and 20.2% of the population were below the poverty line, including 23.2% of those under age 18 and 15.0% of those age 65 or over.

=== 2000 census ===
As of the census of 2000, there were 42,903 people, 17,239 households, and 12,653 families living in the county. The population density was 85 inhabitants per square mile (33/km^{2}). There were 19,107 housing units at an average density of 38 per square mile (15/km^{2}). The racial makeup of the county was 98.79% White, 0.13% Black or African American, 0.23% Native Americans, 0.20% Asian, 0.02% Pacific Islander, 0.08% from other races, and 0.56% from two or more races. 0.47% of the population were Hispanic or Latino of any race.

There were 17,239 households, out of which 31.20% had children under the age of 18 living with them, 59.20% were married couples living together, 10.80% had a female householder with no husband present, and 26.60% were non-families. 24.10% of all households were made up of individuals, and 11.10% had someone living alone who was 65 years of age or older. The average household size was 2.48 and the average family size was 2.92.

In the county, the population was spread out, with 23.40% under the age of 18, 8.70% from 18 to 24, 27.70% from 25 to 44, 25.30% from 45 to 64, and 14.90% who were 65 years of age or older. The median age was 38 years. For every 100 females there were 95.80 males. For every 100 females age 18 and over, there were 91.80 males.

The median income for a household in the county was $27,352, and the median income for a family was $32,458. Males had a median income of $31,554 versus $20,720 for females. The per capita income for the county was $14,906. About 16.20% of families and 19.60% of the population were below the poverty line, including 25.50% of those under age 18 and 15.20% of those age 65 or over.

=== Ancestry/Ethnicity ===
As of 2017 the largest self-identified ancestry groups in Wayne County were:

Largest ancestries (2015)	Percent
English	23.7%
Irish	13.7%
"American"	12.2%
German	9.5%
Italian	2.2%
Scottish	2.1%
Scots-Irish	2.0%
French (except Basque)	1.0%
Polish	0.7%

== Politics ==
Prior to 2000, Wayne County was strongly Democratic in presidential elections, with only four Republican candidates winning the county from 1872 to 1996, all as a part of a national landslide win for the party. Since 2000, the county has swung to becoming strongly Republican similar to the rest of West Virginia, so strongly that Donald Trump won the county in 2016, 2020, and 2024 by a margin of over 50 percent.

United States presidential election results for Wayne County, West Virginia
Year	Republican		Democratic		Third party(ies)	
Year	No.	%	No.	%	No.	%
1912	1,465	29.41%	2,634	52.88%	882	17.71%
1916	2,215	42.21%	2,989	56.97%	43	0.82%
1920	3,754	45.54%	4,490	54.46%	0	0.00%
1924	3,999	39.03%	5,870	57.29%	378	3.69%
1928	5,630	51.89%	5,177	47.72%	42	0.39%
1932	4,682	34.89%	8,648	64.44%	90	0.67%
1936	5,603	38.41%	8,954	61.38%	31	0.21%
1940	5,701	37.20%	9,626	62.80%	0	0.00%
1944	4,516	40.53%	6,627	59.47%	0	0.00%
1948	4,394	36.52%	7,618	63.32%	19	0.16%
1952	7,059	44.85%	8,679	55.15%	0	0.00%
1956	8,429	52.41%	7,655	47.59%	0	0.00%
1960	8,128	47.07%	9,140	52.93%	0	0.00%
1964	5,340	31.56%	11,578	68.44%	0	0.00%
1968	6,004	36.79%	8,227	50.41%	2,088	12.79%
1972	9,775	60.99%	6,251	39.01%	0	0.00%
1976	6,009	37.63%	9,958	62.37%	0	0.00%
1980	7,541	45.10%	8,687	51.96%	491	2.94%
1984	8,811	51.12%	8,378	48.61%	47	0.27%
1988	7,123	45.15%	8,621	54.65%	31	0.20%
1992	5,729	35.05%	8,392	51.35%	2,223	13.60%
1996	5,492	35.49%	8,300	53.63%	1,684	10.88%
2000	7,993	49.21%	7,940	48.89%	308	1.90%
2004	10,070	54.11%	8,411	45.20%	128	0.69%
2008	8,947	57.98%	6,137	39.77%	346	2.24%
2012	8,688	62.02%	4,931	35.20%	390	2.78%
2016	11,152	72.67%	3,357	21.87%	838	5.46%
2020	12,585	74.26%	4,088	24.12%	274	1.62%
2024	11,934	75.79%	3,532	22.43%	281	1.78%

== Transportation ==
=== Rail ===
- Norfolk Southern Railway's former N&W Kenova District
- CSX Transportation's former C&O Kanawha Sub
- Kanawha River Terminal Railroad

=== Air ===
The public Tri-State Airport, the major airport serving the Huntington–Ashland area, is located in Wayne County south of Interstate 64. The airport is accessible from Interstate 64 via Exit 1. Commercial air service is provided by Allegiant Air and American Airlines.

== Notable people ==
- Mariko Elizabeth Alley, Filipino-American international association footballer, and a member of the Philippines women's national team.
- Jeff Baldwin, a Major League Baseball player.
- Derrick Evans, a member of the West Virginia House of Delegates, resigned his seat in 2021 after participating in the January 6 United States Capitol attack.
- Bobby Joe Long, a serial killer who raped and murdered ten women in Tampa, Florida.
- Don Robinson, a Major League Baseball pitcher.
- Michael W. Smith, musician, pastor, and actor.
- Brad D. Smith, President and CEO of Intuit, Inc.
- Blaze Starr, an American burlesque star, known for her affair with Louisiana Governor Earl Kemp Long.
- Carmi Thompson, attorney and Republican politician, was Speaker of the Ohio House of Representatives and Ohio Secretary of State, then Treasurer of the United States from 1912 to 1913.

== Communities ==
=== Cities ===
- Huntington (mostly in Cabell County)
- Kenova

=== Towns ===
- Ceredo
- Fort Gay
- Wayne (county seat)

=== Magisterial districts ===
==== Current ====
- Butler
- Ceredo
- Stonewall
- Union
- Westmoreland

==== Historic ====
- Grant
- Lincoln

=== Census-designated place ===
- Crum
- Lavalette
- Prichard

=== Unincorporated communities ===
- Ardel
- Armilda
- Bethesda
- Booton
- Bowen
- Brabant
- Buffalo Creek
- Centerville
- Coleman
- Cove Gap
- Crockett
- Cyrus
- Dickson
- Doane
- Dunlow
- East Lynn
- Echo
- Effie
- Elmwood
- Ferguson
- Fleming
- Genoa
- Gilkerson
- Girard
- Glenhayes
- Grandview Gardens
- Hidden Valley
- Hubbardstown
- Mineral Springs
- Missouri Branch
- Nestlow
- Oakview Heights
- Quaker
- Radnor
- Saltpetre
- Shoals
- Sidney
- Stepptown
- Stiltner (defunct)
- Stonecoal
- Sweet Run
- Tripp
- Webb
- Wilsondale
- Winslow

== In popular culture ==
The following books take place in Wayne County:

- Last Train to Dunlow by Kay and Jack Dickinson. OCLC 66901525
- On the Trail of the Powhatan Arrow by Kay and Jack Dickinson. ISBN 978-0-9774116-1-0
- Discovering Lavalette by Gina Simmons. ISBN 978-1-4389-8707-1
- Pioneers, Rebels and Wolves by Robert Thompson
- Climbing Trout's Hill by Robert Thompson
- East Lynn Booming by Robert Thompson. OCLC 363205071
- Images Of East Lynn by Robert Thompson
- Fear No Man by Robert Thompson
- Aging Wonders by Robert Thompson
- Few Among The Mountains by Robert Thompson
- Crum by Lee Maynard
- Protectors of the Ohio Valley by Matthew A. Perry ISBN 153292710X

== See also ==
- Beech Fork State Park
- East Lynn Lake
- National Register of Historic Places listings in Wayne County, West Virginia
