= Sweet Run, West Virginia =

Sweet Run
- Unincorporated community
- Interactive map of Sweet Run
- Coordinates: 38°22′1″N 82°34′49″W
- Country: United States
- State: West Virginia
- County: Wayne
- Elevation: 554 ft (169 m)
- Time zone: UTC-5 (Eastern (EST))
  - Summer (DST): UTC-4 (EDT)
- FIPS code: 1555767

Sweet Run is an unincorporated community located in Wayne County, West Virginia, United States.
