= Oakview Heights, West Virginia =

Oakview Heights
- Unincorporated community
- Interactive map of Oakview Heights
- Coordinates: 38°23′28″N 82°34′58″W
- Country: United States
- State: West Virginia
- County: Wayne
- Elevation: 666 ft (203 m)
- Time zone: UTC-5 (Eastern (EST))
  - Summer (DST): UTC-4 (EDT)
- FIPS code: 1728980

Oakview Heights is an unincorporated community located in Wayne County, West Virginia, United States.
