= Girard, West Virginia =

Unincorporated community in West Virginia, United States

Girard
- Unincorporated community
- Interactive map of Girard
- Coordinates: 38°10′4″N 82°18′56″W
- Country: United States
- State: West Virginia
- County: Wayne
- Elevation: 741 ft (226 m)
- Time zone: UTC-5 (Eastern (EST))
  - Summer (DST): UTC-4 (EDT)
- FIPS code: 1549704

Girard is an unincorporated community located in Wayne County, West Virginia, United States.
