= Echo, West Virginia =

Unincorporated community in West Virginia, United States

Echo
- Unincorporated community
- Location within the state of West Virginia Echo (the United States)
- Coordinates: 38°10′40″N 82°28′55″W
- Country: United States
- State: West Virginia
- County: Wayne
- Elevation: 623 ft (190 m)
- Time zone: UTC-5 (Eastern (EST))
  - Summer (DST): UTC-4 (EDT)
- GNIS ID: 1549667

Echo is an unincorporated community located in Wayne County, West Virginia, United States bordered by the town of Wayne to the north, Sidney to the south, and Fort Gay to the west.
