= Effie, West Virginia =

Unincorporated community in West Virginia, United States

Effie
- Unincorporated community
- Location within the state of West Virginia Effie (the United States)
- Coordinates: 38°5′40″N 82°30′30″W
- Country: United States
- State: West Virginia
- County: Wayne
- Elevation: 692 ft (211 m)
- Time zone: UTC-5 (Eastern (EST))
  - Summer (DST): UTC-4 (EDT)
- GNIS ID: 1554375

Effie is an unincorporated community located in Wayne County, West Virginia, United States.
