= Coleman, West Virginia =

Unincorporated community in West Virginia, United States

Coleman
- Unincorporated community
- Location within the state of West Virginia Coleman (the United States)
- Coordinates: 38°9′44″N 82°28′30″W
- Country: United States
- State: West Virginia
- County: Wayne
- Elevation: 627 ft (191 m)
- Time zone: UTC-5 (Eastern (EST))
  - Summer (DST): UTC-4 (EDT)
- GNIS ID: 1554176

Coleman is an unincorporated community located in Wayne County, West Virginia, United States .
