= Hidden Valley, West Virginia =

Hidden Valley
- Unincorporated community
- Interactive map of Hidden Valley
- Coordinates: 38°21′28″N 82°32′22″W
- Country: United States
- State: West Virginia
- County: Wayne
- Elevation: 623 ft (190 m)
- Time zone: UTC-5 (Eastern (EST))
  - Summer (DST): UTC-4 (EDT)
- FIPS code: 1728955

Hidden Valley is an unincorporated community located in Wayne County, West Virginia, United States.
