= Centerville, Wayne County, West Virginia =

Unincorporated community in West Virginia, United States

Centerville, West Virginia
- Unincorporated community
- Location within West Virginia Location within the United States
- Coordinates: 38°15′41″N 82°31′47″W
- Country: United States
- State: West Virginia
- County: Wayne
- Elevation: 591 ft (180 m)
- Time zone: UTC-5 (Eastern (EST))
  - Summer (DST): UTC-4 (EDT)
- Area codes: 304 & 681
- GNIS feature ID: 1554097

Centerville is an unincorporated community in Wayne County, West Virginia, United States. Centerville is located on County Route 19 and Whites Creek, 5.5 miles (8.9 km) west-northwest of Wayne.
