= Webb, West Virginia =

Webb
- Unincorporated community
- Interactive map of Webb
- Coordinates: 37°58′11″N 82°28′57″W
- Country: United States
- State: West Virginia
- County: Wayne
- Elevation: 614 ft (187 m)
- Time zone: UTC-5 (Eastern (EST))
  - Summer (DST): UTC-4 (EDT)
- FIPS code: 1548861

Webb is an unincorporated community located in Wayne County, West Virginia, United States.
