= Wildcat Branch Petroglyphs =

- U.S. National Register of Historic Places
- Nearest city: Fort Gay, West Virginia
- Area: 0.2 acres (0.081 ha)
- NRHP reference No.: 79002603
- Added to NRHP: July 22, 1979

The Wildcat Branch Petroglyphs are five prehistoric petroglyph carvings located near Fort Gay, West Virginia. They were listed on the National Register of Historic Places in 1979. The petroglyphs are carved on a large rock in the backyard of a private home and are within 100 feet (30 m) of a creek. Four of the carvings depict birds, while the fifth appears to depict a beaver. The carvings were likely made during the Late Woodland period.
