= Cove Gap, West Virginia =

Unincorporated community in West Virginia, United States

- Unincorporated community
- Location within West Virginia Location within the United States
- Coordinates: 38°05′44″N 82°15′16″W
- Country: United States
- State: West Virginia
- County: Wayne
- Elevation: 873 ft (266 m)
- Time zone: UTC-5 (Eastern (EST))
  - Summer (DST): UTC-4 (EDT)
- Area codes: 304 & 681
- GNIS feature ID: 1537725

Cove Gap is an unincorporated community in Wayne County, West Virginia, United States. Cove Gap is 13.5 miles (21.7 km) southeast of Wayne.

== History ==
=== 2012 tornado ===
On March 2, 2012, an EF3 tornado passed near the community, destroying 15 homes and inflicting major damage to 7 others. This included a two-story home that had its roof and multiple exterior and interior walls torn away. Narrow roads and hillsides in the area were left covered in fallen trees and power lines, pieces of sheet metal roofing, and damaged vehicles. Ironically, a funeral in the area that evening may have saved several lives since it was being held in a nearby community for a Cove Gap resident at the time of the tornado. Several neighbors attended the funeral and were not at home when the storm hit, only later to return to find their homes damaged or destroyed.
