= Dickson, West Virginia =

Unincorporated community in West Virginia, United States

- Unincorporated community
- Location within West Virginia Location within the United States
- Coordinates: 37°46′09″N 80°20′46″W
- Country: United States
- State: West Virginia
- County: Greenbrier
- Elevation: 1,850 ft (560 m)
- Time zone: UTC-5 (Eastern (EST))
  - Summer (DST): UTC-4 (EDT)
- Area codes: 304 & 681
- GNIS feature ID: 1554300

Dickson is an unincorporated community in Greenbrier County, West Virginia, United States. Dickson is located along Interstate 64, 3.5 miles (5.6 km) southwest of White Sulphur Springs.
