= Cuzzie, West Virginia =

Unincorporated community in West Virginia, United States

- Unincorporated community
- Location within West Virginia Location within the United States
- Coordinates: 38°7′25″N 82°13′17″W
- Country: United States
- State: West Virginia
- County: Lincoln
- Elevation: 689 ft (210 m)
- Time zone: UTC-5 (Eastern (EST))
  - Summer (DST): UTC-4 (EDT)
- GNIS feature ID: 1549651

Cuzzie is an unincorporated community in Lincoln County, West Virginia, United States. Its post office is closed.

Cuzzie Smith, an early postmaster, gave the community her name.
