= West Virginia Route 75 =

State highway in West Virginia, United States

West Virginia Route 75

Route information
- Maintained by WVDOH
- Length: 12.1 mi (19.5 km)

Major junctions
- West end: US 60 in Kenova
- I-64 / US 52 in Kenova; US 52 near Kenova
- East end: WV 152 near Lavalette

Location
- Country: United States
- State: West Virginia
- Counties: Wayne

Highway system
- West Virginia State Highway System; Interstate; US; State
← WV 74	→ WV 76

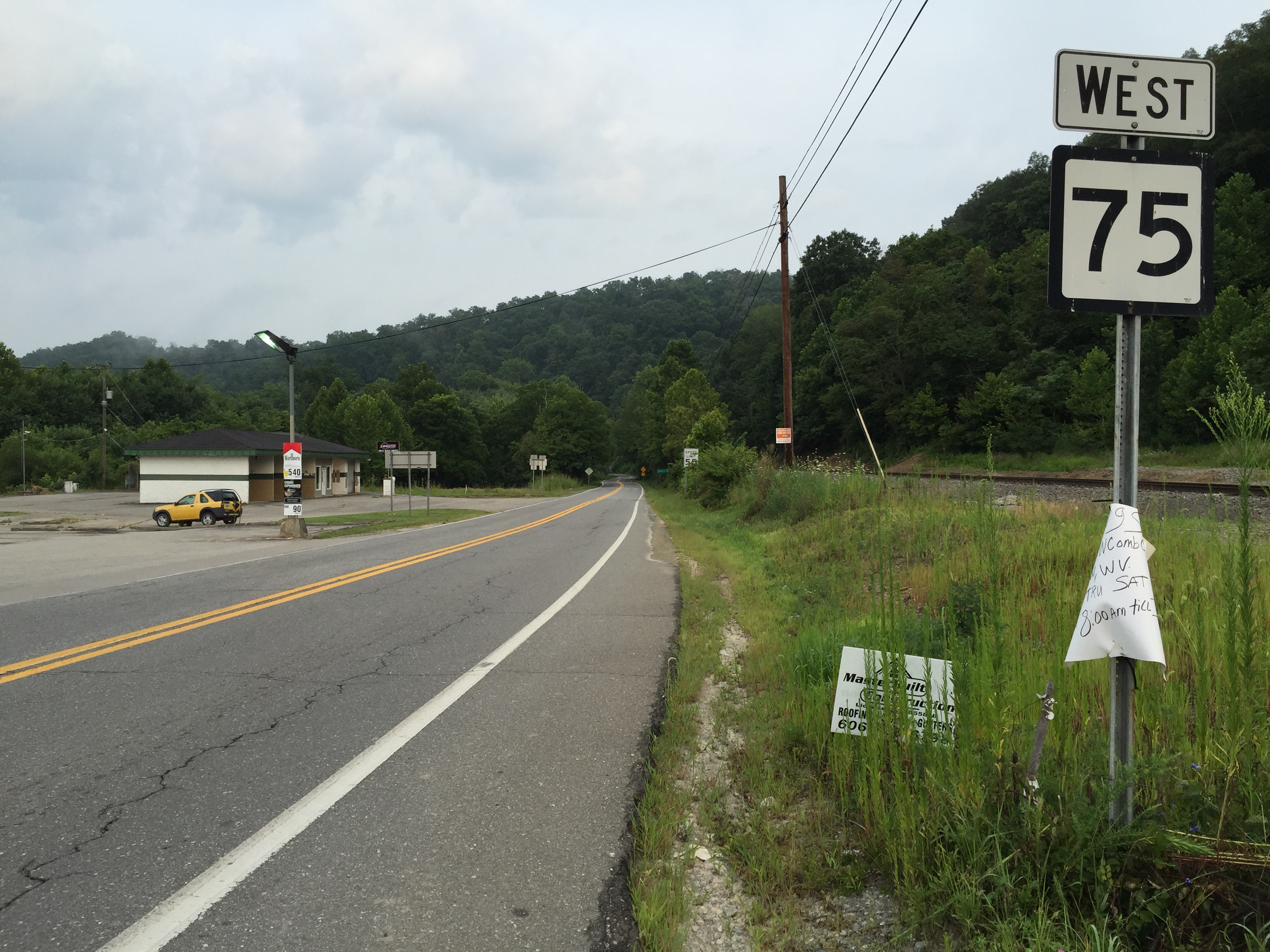
View west along WV 75 at WV 152 north of Lavalette

West Virginia Route 75 is an east–west state route in Wayne County, West Virginia. The western terminus of the route is at U.S. Route 60 (Oak Street) in Kenova. From US 60, WV 75 proceeds to the south then east towards its eastern terminus at West Virginia Route 152 north of Lavalette.

WV 75 runs concurrent to U.S. Route 52 (Tolsia Highway) from Interstate 64 south for three miles (5 km) to the incomplete diamond interchange.

== Major intersections ==
The entire route is in Wayne County.

Location	mi	km	Destinations	Notes
Kenova			US 60 (Oak Street)	
Kenova			I-64 / US 52 north – Huntington, Ashland, KY	I-64 exit 1; west end of US 52 overlap
			US 52 south – Williamson	east end of US 52 overlap
			WV 152 – Huntington, Wayne	
1.000 mi = 1.609 km; 1.000 km = 0.621 mi: Concurrency terminus
