= Whites Creek (West Virginia) =

Stream in West Virginia, U.S.

Coordinates: 38°18′34″N 82°34′25″W

Whites Creek is a stream in the U.S. state of West Virginia.

Whites Creek was named after one Mr. White, the proprietor of a local gristmill.

== See also ==
- List of rivers of West Virginia
