= Lee Maynard =

American writer (1936–2017)

- Born: July 27, 1936; Crum, West Virginia, U.S.
- Died: June 6, 2017 (aged 80)
- Education: Ceredo-Kenova High School
- Occupations: Novelist; short story writer; journalist
- Spouse: Helen (m. 1959)
- Children: 2

Lee Maynard (July 26, 1936 – June 6, 2017) was an American novelist, short story writer and journalist born in the small town of Crum, West Virginia.

== Education ==
Maynard attended Ceredo-Kenova High School where his father was a teacher and coach, graduating in 1954. Maynard attended West Virginia University where he originally enrolled in pharmacy but later changed his major to journalism. He completed his undergraduate degree in 1962.

== Career ==
In 1958, Maynard withdrew from college before earning his degree. From 1958 to 1961, Maynard served in the United States Army, working as a military policeman and criminal investigator. After being honorably discharged from the Army, he returned to West Virginia University to complete his studies in journalism.

Immediately after college, Maynard was hired as editor of the West Virginia Conservation Magazine by the West Virginia Department of Natural Resources. He later served as the Department's Assistant Director of the Information and Education Division. He also worked as Director of Public Relations for the West Virginia Chamber of Commerce and the editorship of West Virginia Commerce. In 1967, Maynard was named the Executive Secretary of the newly formed West Virginia Commission on Manpower, Technology and Training, the youngest secretary of a state's department.

In 1968, Maynard departed West Virginia state government to serve as the National Director of Operations for Outward Bound in Boston, Massachusetts. During the 1970s, he worked as an administrator at Prescot College in Prescott, Arizona; designer of a ski resort in Crested Butte, Colorado; director of an Outward Bound school in Texas and New Mexico; and self-employed consultant. For more than two decades, Maynard contributed articles regularly to “Reader’s Digest” about real-life adventure stories. His nonfiction reporting has also appeared in The Saturday Review, Rider Magazine, Washington Post, Country America, Dual Sport News and Christian Science Monitor

Maynard was president and CEO of The Storehouse, a nonprofit food pantry providing food for the needy in the greater Albuquerque, New Mexico, area.

Maynard has taught writing at many workshops, including the Appalachian Writers Workshop, Southwest Writers Workshop, and West Virginia Writers Conference. He has served as Writing Master at Allegheny Echoes.

== Crum controversy ==
In 2001, Tamarack, the state-owned artisan center and gift shop on the West Virginia Turnpike, refused to stock Maynard's recently re-issued novel, Crum. Tamarack was designed to showcase and sell the work of West Virginia artists, craftspeople, and performers, but refused to sell the novel. Tamarack deemed it unsuitable for sale, citing its sexually explicit language and negative portrayal of West Virginia.

== Personal life and death ==
In 1959, Maynard married his wife of more than 50 years, Helen. They met while Maynard served in the Army as a military policeman; Helen's father was a local police commissioner with whom Maynard worked. Their daughter Darci was born in 1962, and their son Toran in 1965.

Maynard was an avid motorcyclist and airplane pilot. He died on June 6, 2017, at the age of 80.

== Bibliography ==
The Crum Trilogy:

- Crum. New York: Washington Square Press. 1988.
- Screaming with the Cannibals. Morgantown, WV, Vandalia Press. 2003.
- The Scummers. Morgantown, WV, Vandalia Press. 2012

Additional work:

- The Pale Light of Sunset: Scattershots and Hallucinations in an Imagined Life. Morgantown, WV, Vandalia Press. 2009.
- Magnetic North. Morgantown, WV, Vandalia Press. 2015
- Cinco Becknell. Morgantown, WV, Vandalia Press. 2015

== Awards and honors ==
In 1995, Maynard received a National Endowment for the Arts Literary Fellowship in Fiction.
