= Plymale Branch =

Stream in West Virginia named after pioneer settler

Coordinates: 38°20′48″N 82°29′35″W

Plymale Branch is a stream in the U.S. state of West Virginia.

Plymale Branch was named after John Plymale, a pioneer who settled there.

== See also ==
- List of rivers of West Virginia
