= Breeden, West Virginia =

Unincorporated community in West Virginia, United States

- Unincorporated community
- Location within West Virginia Location within the United States
- Coordinates: 37°55′31″N 82°15′58″W
- Country: United States
- State: West Virginia
- County: Mingo
- Elevation: 830 ft (250 m)
- Time zone: UTC-5 (Eastern (EST))
  - Summer (DST): UTC-4 (EDT)
- ZIP code: 25666
- Area codes: 304 & 681
- GNIS feature ID: 1549610

Breeden is an unincorporated community in Mingo County, West Virginia, United States. Breeden is 9.5 miles (15.3 km) northeast of Kermit. Breeden has a post office with ZIP code 25666.

Breeden most likely was named after an early settler.
