= Genoa, West Virginia =

Unincorporated community in West Virginia, United States

- Unincorporated community
- Location within West Virginia Location within the United States
- Coordinates: 38°07′19″N 82°27′36″W
- Country: United States
- State: West Virginia
- County: Wayne
- Elevation: 643 ft (196 m)
- Time zone: UTC-5 (Eastern (EST))
  - Summer (DST): UTC-4 (EDT)
- ZIP code: 25517
- Area codes: 304 & 681
- GNIS feature ID: 1539366

Genoa is an unincorporated community in Wayne County, West Virginia, United States. It is located on West Virginia Route 152, 7 miles (11 km) south of Wayne and has a post office with ZIP code 25517.

The community is named for Genoa Reed, the daughter of a former postmaster, E. P. Reed.
