= Wilsondale, West Virginia =

- Unincorporated community
- Location within the state of West Virginia Wilsondale, West Virginia (the United States)
- Coordinates: 37°57′13.36″N 82°19′39.5″W
- Country: United States
- State: West Virginia
- County: Wayne

Population (2000)
  - Total: 74
- Time zone: UTC-5 (Eastern EST))
  - Summer (DST): UTC-5 (CDT)
- ZIP code: 25699
- Area code: 304
- GNIS feature ID: 1549993

Wilsondale is an unincorporated community located in southern Wayne County, West Virginia, United States. Wilsondale has a post office with ZIP code 25699; as of the 2000 Census, the population of this ZIP Code Tabulation Area was 74. It is a part of the Huntington-Ashland, WV-KY-OH, Metropolitan Statistical Area (MSA). As of the 2000 census, the MSA had a population of 288,649.

== Geography ==
Wilsondale is located at 37°57′13″N 82°19′40″W. Wilsondale is in the Eastern Time Zone (UTC -5 hours) and observes Daylight Saving Time.

== Demographics ==
Wilsondale's ZCTA had a population of 74, with 41 males and 33 females, at the 2000 census. 98.6% of the population was white, while the remaining 1.4% was American Indian or Alaska Native. There were 32 households with an average household size of 2.64. The average house value was listed at $45,000, with an average household income of $21,375. The median age of the general population was 46.30 years, with the male median age at 41.80 and the female median age at 50.30.

== Notable person ==
- Blaze Starr, raised in the Newground Hollow area of Wilsondale.
