= East Lynn, West Virginia =

Unincorporated community in West Virginia, United States

East Lynn
- Unincorporated community
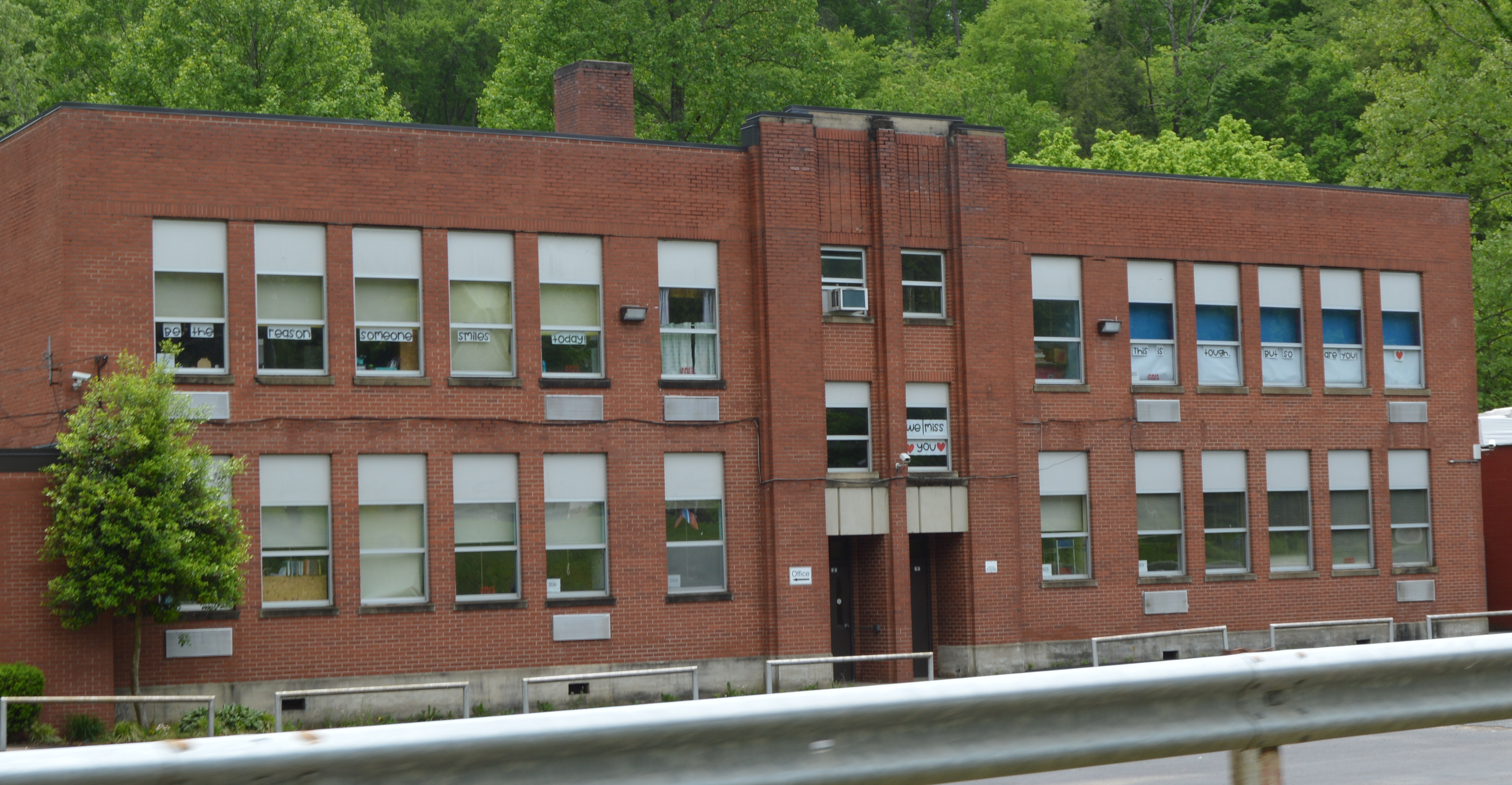
- Elementary school

- Location within the state of West Virginia East Lynn (the United States)
- Coordinates: 38°10′4″N 82°22′41″W
- Country: United States
- State: West Virginia
- County: Wayne
- Time zone: UTC-5 (Eastern (EST))
  - Summer (DST): UTC-4 (EDT)
- GNIS feature ID: 1538508

East Lynn is an unincorporated community in Wayne County, West Virginia, United States, located along the banks of Twelvepole Creek, approximately eight miles south of the county seat, Wayne. It was also known as Mouth of Little Lynn. East Lynn is a part of the Huntington-Ashland Metropolitan Statistical Area (MSA). As of the 2010 census, the MSA had a population of 287,702. New definitions from February 28, 2013 placed the population at 363,000.

== History ==
East Lynn began as a small merchant community known as Twin Creek but eventually grew as a coal town. In 1868, the Adkins Mills Post Office was established and the community was known as Adkins Mills. The Big Sandy, East Lynn & Guyan Railroad was formed in 1903 and merged with the Norfolk and Western in 1908. Also in 1908, East Lynn was incorporated. East Lynn continued to grow in the 1910s and at various times had three movie theaters, doctors, lawyers, and a detective agency. In the late 1910s, the residents decided to abandon the town's charter, and the town became unincorporated once again. Much of the town was destroyed by fire in November 1919. East Lynn was rebuilt; however, it burned once again in February 1955. The coal mines shut down in the 1960s, and the railroad left, leaving the town dilapidated. The East Lynn Lake was created in the 1960s by the Army Corps of Engineers. Rockspring Development reopened a mine near East Lynn on Camp Creek, but as of 2005 it has not created any new growth for the town itself.

== Demographics ==
East Lynn is a part of the Huntington-Ashland, WV-KY-OH, Metropolitan Statistical Area (MSA). As of the 2000 census, the MSA had a population of 288,649.
