= Twelvepole Creek =

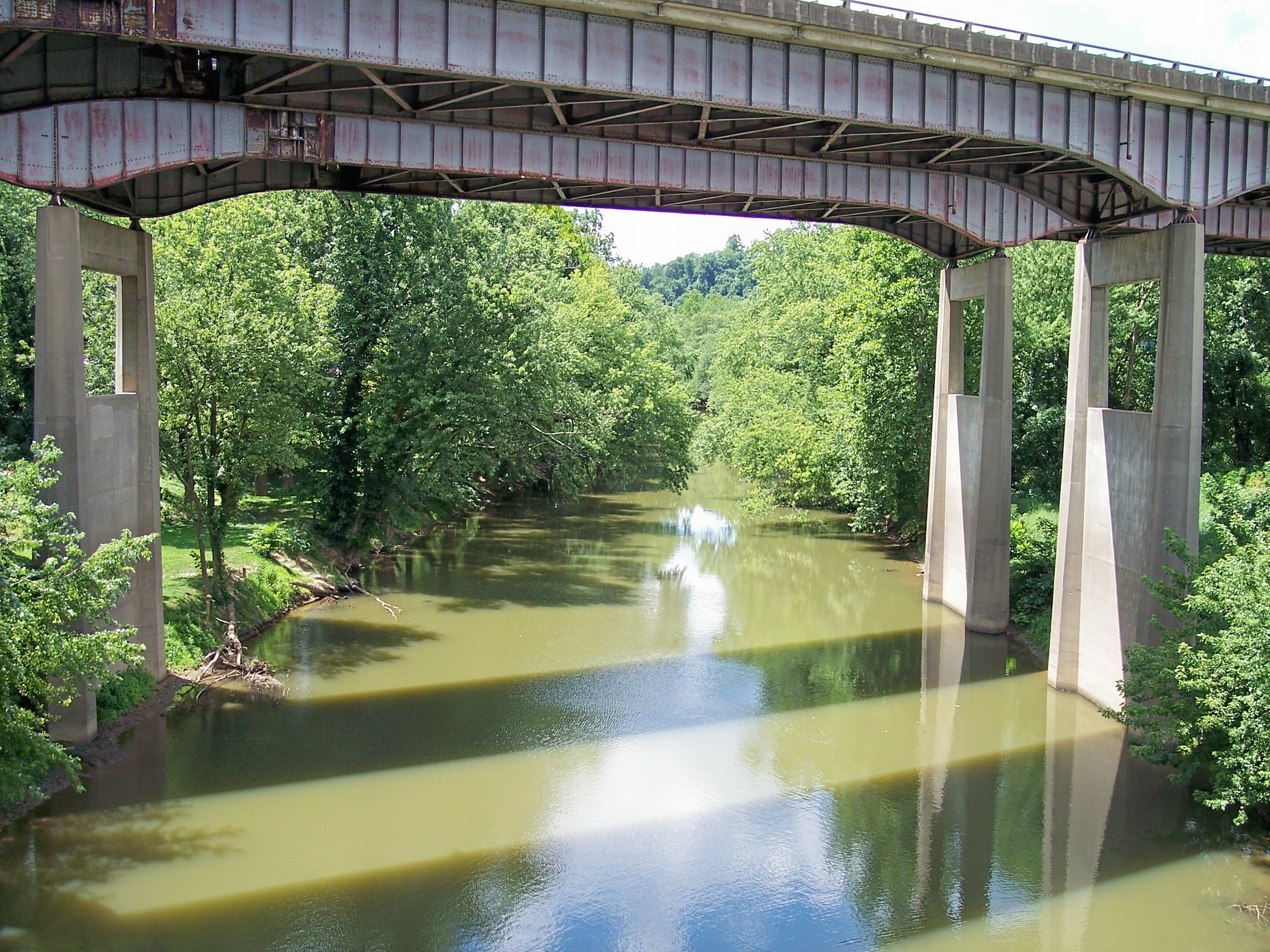
- Twelvepole Creek near its mouth in Ceredo, flowing beneath Interstate 64

Location
- Country: United States
- State: West Virginia
- County: Wayne

Physical characteristics
- Source: East Fork Twelvepole Creek
  - location: Dingess Mountain, Mingo County, West Virginia
  - coordinates: 37°53′02″N 82°07′15″W
  - elevation: 1,277 ft (389 m)
- 2nd source: West Fork Twelvepole Creek
  - location: Dingess Mountain, Mingo County, West Virginia
  - coordinates: 37°51′33″N 82°06′48″W
  - elevation: 1,676 ft (511 m)
- Source confluence
  - location: Wayne, West Virginia
  - coordinates: 38°12′41″N 82°26′44″W
  - elevation: 594 ft (181 m)
- Mouth: Ohio River
  - location: Ceredo, West Virginia
  - coordinates: 38°24′04″N 82°31′51″W
  - elevation: 515 ft (157 m)
- Discharge
  - location: East Fork near m,
  - average: 8.3 cu ft/s (0.24 m^{3}/s)
  - minimum: 0.13 cu ft/s (0.0037 m^{3}/s)(1989)
  - maximum: 99 cu ft/s (2.8 m^{3}/s)(1980)

Basin features
- Tributaries
  - right: Beech Fork, Plymale Branch

Twelvepole Creek is a 32.2-mile-long (51.8 km) river located in Wayne County, West Virginia, United States. It is part of the Mississippi River watershed, by way of the Ohio River. It is alternately known as Twelve Pole Creek.

== Course ==
Twelvepole Creek rises in northern Mingo County before flowing north through Wayne County. The headwaters of the East Fork of the Twelvepole are dammed to form East Lynn Lake. The East Fork of the river then flows north through East Lynn, Wayne, and Lavalette. The West Fork of the Twelvepole flows north through Dunlow, West Virginia and joins the East Fork at the town of Wayne. The river then flows north again before draining into the Ohio River just east of Ceredo.

== Origin of name ==
Twelvepole Creek received its name from early explorers. The group supposedly included a young George Washington. Traveling the Ohio River, they measured the mouth of the creek where it joined the Ohio in terms of poles, also known as rods. Being approximately 198 feet (12 poles) wide at its mouth, the creek was named Twelvepole Creek.

== Recreation ==
East Lynn Lake and Beech Fork Lake (formed from one of Twelvepole Creek's tributaries) provide popular destinations for boating, fishing, swimming, and camping.

== See also ==
- List of West Virginia rivers
