= Big Sandy River (Ohio River tributary) =

River forming part of the Kentucky-West Virginia border

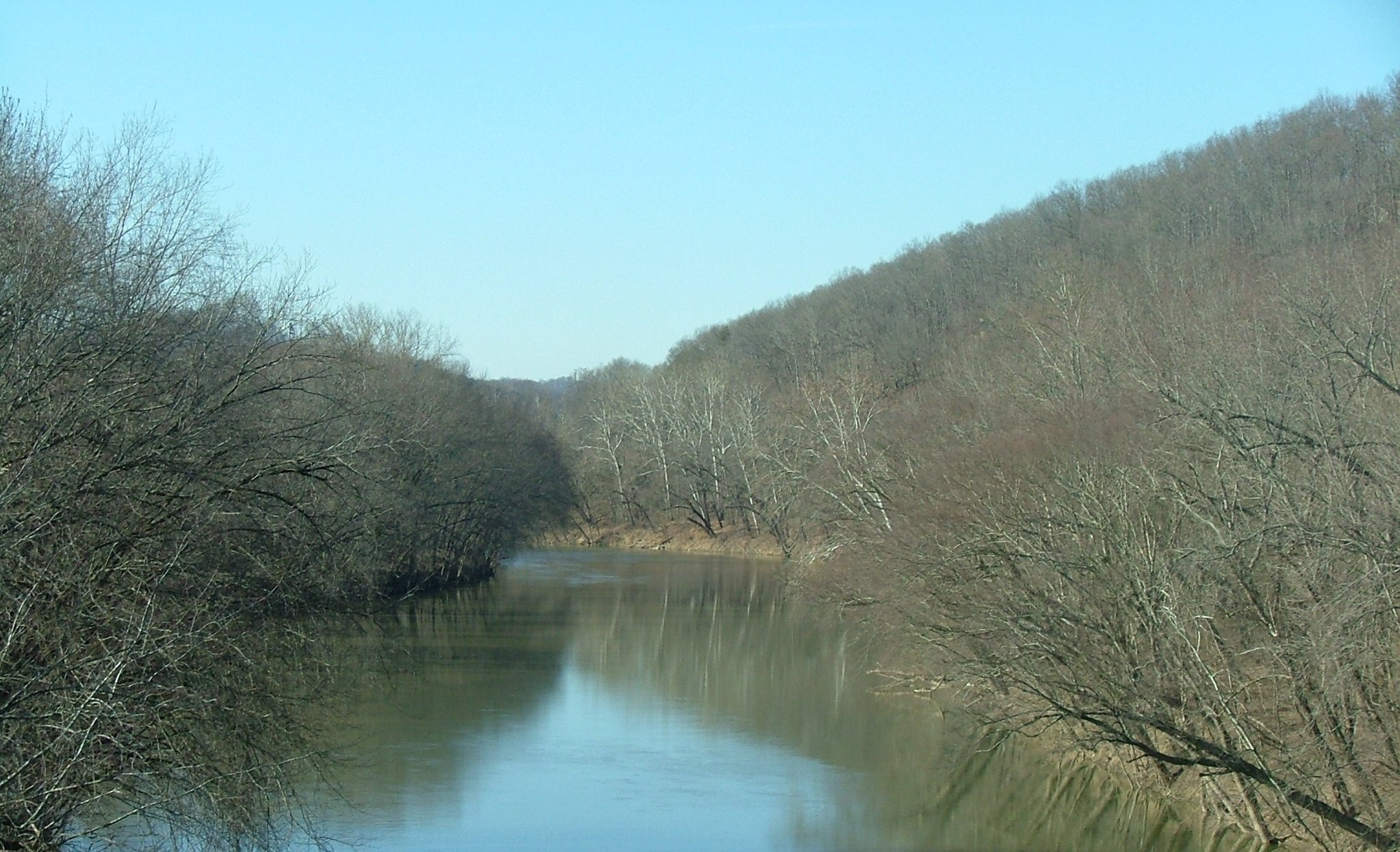
- Confluence of Levisa Fork and Tug Fork, forming the Big Sandy River

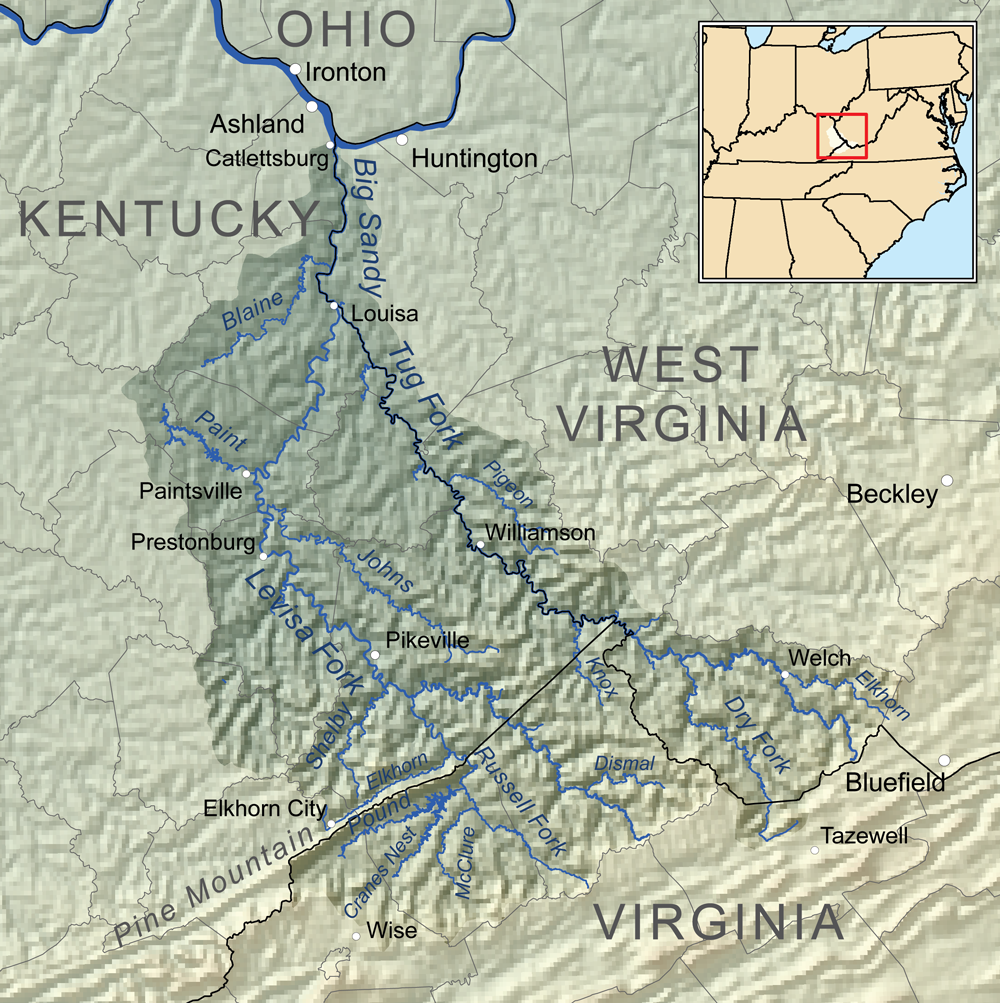
- Map of the Big Sandy River watershed, with its Levisa Fork (left) and Tug Fork (right) tributaries shown

Location
- Country: United States
- State: Kentucky, West Virginia
- Counties: Lawrence KY, Wayne WV, Boyd KY

Physical characteristics
- Source: Tug Fork
  - location: Big Stone Ridge, McDowell County, WV
  - coordinates: 37°16′38″N 81°26′06″W
  - elevation: 2,604 ft (794 m)
- 2nd source: Levisa Fork
  - location: Gap of Sandy, Buchanan County, VA
  - coordinates: 37°09′06″N 81°54′04″W
  - elevation: 2,657 ft (810 m)
- Source confluence
  - location: Louisa, KY
  - coordinates: 38°07′05″N 82°36′06″W
  - elevation: 545 ft (166 m)
- Mouth: Ohio River
  - location: Catlettsburg, KY
  - coordinates: 38°24′58″N 82°35′45″W
  - elevation: 525 ft (160 m)
- Length: 29 mi (47 km)
- Basin size: 4,280 sq mi (11,100 km^{2})
- Discharge
  - location: mouth
  - average: 5,006.74 cu ft/s (141.775 m^{3}/s) (estimate)

The Big Sandy River, called Sandy Creek as early as 1756, is a tributary of the Ohio River, approximately 29 miles (47 km) long, in western West Virginia and northeastern Kentucky in the United States. The river forms part of the boundary between the two states along its entire course. Via the Ohio River, it is part of the Mississippi River watershed.

The name of the river, originally called Sandy Creek by 1756, comes from the presence of extensive sand bars. The Native American names for the river included Tatteroa, Chatteroi, and Chatterwha. The name "Big Sandy" was in use no later than February, 1789.

== Course ==
It is formed between Louisa, Kentucky, and Fort Gay, West Virginia, by the confluence of the Tug Fork and Levisa Fork. It flows generally northwardly in a highly meandering course, between Lawrence and Boyd counties in Kentucky and Wayne County in West Virginia. It joins the Ohio between Catlettsburg, Kentucky and Kenova, West Virginia, 8 miles (13 km) west of Huntington, West Virginia, at the common boundary between West Virginia, Kentucky, and Ohio.

The river is navigable and carries commercial shipping, primarily coal mined in the immediate region.

== History ==
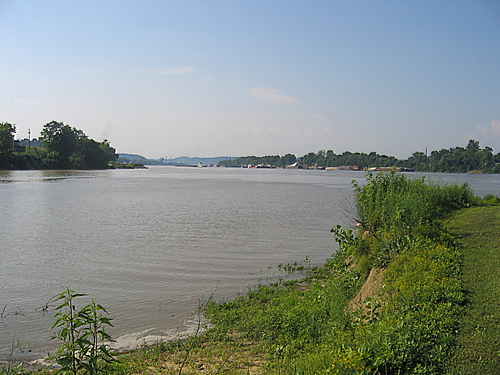
Mouth of the Big Sandy River (left) at the Ohio River between Catlettsburg, Kentucky and Kenova, West Virginia; the land in the background is in South Point, Ohio.

Some Native American groups have links to the area and region, such as the Shawnee, Cherokee, Tutelo, Issa, and others.

In 1756, as part of the French and Indian War, the Sandy Creek Expedition occurred in the valley.

George Washington surveyed land at the mouth of the river between 1768 and 1772.

The tombstone of David White, an early settler along the river in Kentucky, marks his passing in 1817 with the note that he lived many years near the Mouth of the Big Sandy.

Several notable personalities relating to the Civil War hailed from the Big Sandy Valley. Likewise, the valley hosted important war-time events.

The Tug Fork of the Big Sandy River is the site of the Hatfield-McCoy feud.

=== Martin County sludge spill ===
On October 11, 2000, the Martin County sludge spill polluted hundreds of miles of the Ohio River, the Big Sandy River and its tributaries. The accident was caused when a coal sludge impoundment owned by Massey Energy in Kentucky broke into an abandoned underground mine below. Toxic pollutants including heavy metals such as mercury, lead, arsenic, copper and chromium were found in the sludge that spilled into these waterways.

The spill was 30 times larger than the Exxon Valdez oil spill (12 million US gallons (45,000 m^{3})) and one of the worst environmental disasters ever in the southeastern United States, according to the U.S. Environmental Protection Agency.

== Popular culture ==
Two well-known fiddle tunes take their name from the Big Sandy River: "Sandy River Belle" and the "Big Sandy River". Loretta Lynn's "Van Lear Rose" and Dwight Yoakam's "Bury Me" also mention the river.

== See also ==
- List of Kentucky rivers
- List of West Virginia rivers
- Little Sandy River
- Port of Huntington Tri-State
