= Fort Gay, West Virginia =

- Town
- Location of Fort Gay in Wayne County, West Virginia.
- Coordinates: 38°7′3″N 82°35′41″W
- Country: United States
- State: West Virginia
- County: Wayne
- Chartered: 1875

Government
  - Mayor: Bob Sword
  - Judge: Larry Britt

Area
  - Total: 0.87 sq mi (2.26 km^{2})
  - Land: 0.83 sq mi (2.14 km^{2})
  - Water: 0.050 sq mi (0.13 km^{2})
- Elevation: 581 ft (177 m)

Population (2020)
  - Total: 675
  - Estimate (2021): 671
  - Density: 835.6/sq mi (322.62/km^{2})
- Time zone: UTC-5 (Eastern (EST))
  - Summer (DST): UTC-4 (EDT)
- ZIP code: 25514
- Area code: 304
- FIPS code: 54-28516
- GNIS feature ID: 1554491

Fort Gay is a town in Wayne County, West Virginia, United States, situated along the Tug Fork and Big Sandy rivers. It is located within the Huntington–Ashland metropolitan area, and adjoins Louisa, Kentucky. The population was 677 at the 2020 census.

== History ==
=== Early history ===
The Fort Gay community traces back to 1789, when 11 people established a settlement at the junction of the Tug and Big Sandy rivers, across from what is now Louisa, Kentucky. In 1875, it was chartered as Cassville; though it was simultaneously known as Fort Gay. In 1932, the town's name was officially changed to Fort Gay. Although there is no evidence as to why the name was changed, there are several prevalent theories: that either the railroad company or post office did not want two Cassvilles on the same route/state (there is another Cassville, West Virginia), or that a Civil War nurse named Gay became synonymous with the town.

=== Xbox controversy ===
In 2010, Fort Gay got media attention when Microsoft suspended the Xbox Live account of a Fort Gay resident named Josh Moore for writing "fort gay WV" as his location. Even though there was a valid ZIP code for Fort Gay, Microsoft may have thought that Josh was mocking homosexuality. Microsoft customer service representatives refused to acknowledge that Fort Gay existed. Moore said: "I'm not even gay and it makes me feel like they were discriminating." It took media coverage and an appeal from Fort Gay's mayor for the issue to be corrected.

=== Embezzlement case ===
On November 22, 2024, Mayor Joetta Hatfield and Town Recorder/ Treasurer Shelia Bowen were arrested following an investigation by the West Virginia State Auditor's office and West Virginia State Police. It was discovered that the two had allegedly embezzled over $370,000 of town funds since 2017, using them to issue unauthorized checks, overcompensate themselves for leave, withdraw cash, and adjust utility payments for their benefit. On December 3, Hatfield and Bowen resigned from their positions. On July 17, 2025, Hatfield and Bowen were indicted by a grand jury on charges of embezzlement, fraudulent schemes, conspiracy, falsifying records, and computer fraud.

Following Hatfield's resignation, city councilman Ralph Dent was chosen by the council to serve as interim mayor. In a special election held on June 10, Bob Sword was elected mayor with 63 votes (56.3%) over Dent and another challenger.

== Geography ==
Fort Gay is located at 38°7′3″N 82°35′41″W (38.117528, -82.594620).

According to the United States Census Bureau, the town has a total area of 0.89 square miles (2.31 km^{2}), of which 0.84 square miles (2.18 km^{2}) is land and 0.05 square miles (0.13 km^{2}) is water.

The Norfolk Southern Railway's Kenova District goes through the western edge of town.

== Demographics ==
Historical population
Census	Pop.	Note	%±
1880	253		—
1890	266		5.1%
1910	457		—
1920	617		35.0%
1930	664		7.6%
1940	645		−2.9%
1950	714		10.7%
1960	739		3.5%
1970	792		7.2%
1980	886		11.9%
1990	852		−3.8%
2000	819		−3.9%
2010	705		−13.9%
2020	675		−4.3%
2021 (est.)	671	▼	−0.6%
U.S. Decennial Census

=== 2010 census ===
As of the census of 2010, there were 705 people, 323 households, and 197 families living in the town. The population density was 839.3 inhabitants per square mile (324.1/km^{2}). There were 380 housing units at an average density of 452.4 per square mile (174.7/km^{2}). The racial makeup of the town was 96.6% White, 0.6% Native American, 0.3% Asian, 0.1% from other races, and 2.4% from two or more races. Hispanic or Latino of any race were 0.6% of the population.

There were 323 households, of which 27.2% had children under the age of 18 living with them, 43.0% were married couples living together, 14.2% had a female householder with no husband present, 3.7% had a male householder with no wife present, and 39.0% were non-families. 35.9% of all households were made up of individuals, and 14.6% had someone living alone who was 65 years of age or older. The average household size was 2.18 and the average family size was 2.79.

The median age in the town was 43.2 years. 19.7% of residents were under the age of 18; 7.8% were between the ages of 18 and 24; 25% were from 25 to 44; 29.6% were from 45 to 64; and 17.9% were 65 years of age or older. The gender makeup of the town was 46.1% male and 53.9% female.

=== 2000 census ===
As of the census of 2000, there were 819 people, 345 households, and 240 families living in the town. The population density was 1,034.5 inhabitants per square mile (400.3/km^{2}). There were 394 housing units at an average density of 497.7 per square mile (192.6/km^{2}). The racial makeup of the town was 98.66% White, 0.49% Asian, and 0.85% from two or more races.

There were 345 households, out of which 33.3% had children under the age of 18 living with them, 46.1% were married couples living together, 18.3% had a female householder with no husband present, and 30.4% were non-families. 28.1% of all households were made up of individuals, and 13.6% had someone living alone who was 65 years of age or older. The average household size was 2.37 and the average family size was 2.90.

In the town, the population was spread out, with 24.7% under the age of 18, 12.7% from 18 to 24, 27.0% from 25 to 44, 21.7% from 45 to 64, and 13.9% who were 65 years of age or older. The median age was 35 years. For every 100 females there were 82.0 males. For every 100 females age 18 and over, there were 73.8 males.

The median income for a household in the town was $14,569, and the median income for a family was $20,882. Males had a median income of $29,063 versus $16,442 for females. The per capita income for the town was $9,125. About 33.9% of families and 37.3% of the population were below the poverty line, including 53.1% of those under age 18 and 19.4% of those age 65 or over.
