= Halcyon =

Halcyon is a name originally derived from Alcyone of Greek mythology.

Halcyon or Halcyone may refer to:

== Arts and entertainment ==
=== Television ===
- Halcyon (TV series), a Canadian virtual reality murder mystery on SyFy
- The Halcyon, British period drama on ITV

=== Games ===
- Halcyon (console), a video-game console
- Halcyon (role-playing game), an indie role-playing game
- Halcyon, a fictional star system in the action role-playing game The Outer Worlds

=== Music ===
==== Albums ====
- Halcyon (Ellie Goulding album), or the title song, 2012
- Halcyon (Kingfishr album), 2025
- Halcyon (Best Of), by Orbital, 2005
- Halcyon, an EP by Solstice, 1996

==== Songs ====
- "Halcyon" (Chicane song), 2000
- "Halcyon" (Delphic song), 2010
- "Halcyon" (Orbital song), 1992
- "Halcyon", by Andy Moor, 2005
- "Halcyon", by ATB from Dedicated, 2002
- "Halcyon", by Enter Shikari from Common Dreads, 2009
- "Halcyon", by Glass Towers, 2013
- "Halcyon", by Invent Animate from Greyview, 2020
- "Halcyon", by Noisia and The Upbeats, 2019
- "Halcyon", by Spiritbox from Eternal Blue, 2021
- "Halcyon", by Windhand from Eternal Return, 2018
- "Halcyon (Beautiful Days)", by Mono from Walking Cloud and Deep Red Sky, Flag Fluttered and the Sun Shined, 2004
- "Halcyon: The Heavy Silence: In Silent Rain", by ...And Oceans from Cypher, 2002

==== Other uses in music ====
- Halcyon Records, a record label founded by Marian McPartland

=== Literature ===
- Halcyon (poetry collection), by Gabriele D'Annunzio, published in 1903
- Halcyon (Stargate Atlantis novel), a novel by James Swallow
- Halcyon, a comic book published by Image Comics
- Halcyone, a 1912 novel by Elinor Glyn

=== Other arts and entertainment ===
- Halcyon (dialogue), a short dialogue attributed to Plato
- The Halcyon Company, a film studio founded in 2007
- Halcyone, a 1915 painting by Herbert James Draper
- Halcyon, the fictional ship inhabited by guests during the Star Wars: Galactic Starcruiser hotel experience

== Buildings ==
- Halcyon Castle, a castle in Travancore, Kerala, India
- Halcyon (Forsyth County, Georgia) near Atlanta, a large mixed-use development
- Halcyon Gallery, a group of three art galleries in the UK
- Halcyon House, a Georgian style home in Washington, D.C., US

== Places in the United States ==
- Halcyon, California, an unincorporated community
- Halcyon, Missouri, a ghost town
- Halcyon, West Virginia, an unincorporated community

== Ships ==
- HMS Halcyon, various British Royal Navy ships
- USS Halcyon, several US Navy ships
- Halcyon-class minesweeper, a type of British Royal Navy minesweeper
- USFS Halcyon, a US Bureau of Fisheries research vessel from 1919 to 1927
- Halcyon 23, a British sailboat design
- Halcyone, a sailing yacht built by J W Miller & Sons and launched in 1934

== Transportation ==
- Chrysler Halcyon, a concept car
- Halcyon 50, 250 and 450, Janus Motorcycles models
- Halcyon, a hypersonic airliner under development by the Hermeus Corporation

== Other uses ==
- Halcyone, alternate spelling of Alcyone, a figure in Greek mythology
- Halcyon (genus), a genus of kingfishers
- Halcyone Barnes (1913–1988), American collage artist and watercolor painter
- John Styn, also known as Halcyon Lujah, American blogger and entrepreneur
- Halcyon Monitoring Solutions, a company that monitors performance of computer systems
- Halcyon Dive Systems, a diving equipment company that produces the Halcyon RB80 rebreather
- Halcyon linear accelerator, produced by Varian Medical Systems

== See also ==
- Alcione (disambiguation)
- Alcyone (disambiguation)
- Halcion (triazolam), an insomnia drug
- Halcyon Days (disambiguation)
