= Halcyon Days =

Halcyon Days is an oblique reference to the Greek mythological figures Alcyone and Ceyx and Alcyone, often used to denote a past period that is being remembered for being happy and/or successful. It may also refer to:

== Literature ==
- Halcyon Days (book), a 1997 collection of interviews with programmers of early video games
- Halcyon Days, a 1991 play by Steven Dietz
- Halcyon Days, a play by Shoji Kokami

== Music ==
=== Albums ===
- Halcyon Days (Sounds of Swami EP), 2009
- Halcyon Days (BWO album), 2006
- Halcyon Days (Bruce Hornsby album), 2004
- Halcyon Days (Ellie Goulding album), 2013
- Halcyon Days (Steve Roach, Stephen Kent and Kenneth Newby album), 1996
- Halcyon Days (Strawbs album), 1997
- Halcyon Days, a 2007 album by Dr. Strangely Strange
- Halcyon Days, a 2008 album by The Paper Cranes
- Halcyon Days, a 2011 album by Mokhov
- Halcyon Days, a 2013 album by Glass Towers
- Halcyon Days, a 2022 album by Chagall Guevara

=== Compositions ===
- "Halcyon Days", a composition by Henry Purcell, written for the semi-opera The Tempest (circa 1695)
- "Halcyon Days", the first movement of the suite The Three Elizabeths by Eric Coates

=== Songs ===
- "Halcyon Days", by ...And You Will Know Us by the Trail of Dead from The Century of Self
- "Halcyon Days", by A Wilhelm Scream from Benefits of Thinking Out Loud
- "Halcyon Days", by One Thousand Violins
- "Halcyon Days", by Siobhán Donaghy from Ghosts
- "Halcyon Days", by Stratovarius from Nemesis
- "Halcyon Days", by Tages
- "Halcyon Days", by The Screamin' Cheetah Wheelies
- "Halcyon Days", by The Spring Standards
- "Halcyon Days", by Two Gallants from The Bloom and the Blight
- "Halcyon Days", by Prawn
- "Halcyon Days (Where Were You Then?)", by Local H from Whatever Happened to P.J. Soles?
- "Halcyon Daze", by Hidden in Plain View from Life in Dreaming
- "Halcyon Daze", by Mark Lanegan from Houston Publishing Demos 2002
- "The Halcyon Days", by The Tea Party from Triptych

== Other uses ==
- Halcyon Days (company), a British retailer of luxury goods

== See also ==
- Alcione (disambiguation)
- Alcyone (disambiguation)
- Halcion or triazolam, an insomnia drug
- Halcyon (disambiguation)
