= Alcione =

Alcione may refer to:

- Alcione, a 1638 literary work by Pierre du Ryer
- Alcione, a 1787 musical drama by João de Sousa Carvalho
- CANT Z.1007 Alcione, World War II Italian bomber aircraft
- Alcione (opera), a 1706 opera by Marin Marais
- Alcione Nazareth (born 1947), Brazilian samba singer who performs as "Alcione"
- Alcione elainus, a pterosaur species belonging to the family Nyctosauridae
- Multiple ships of the Italian Navy were named Alcione

== See also ==
- Alcyone (disambiguation)
- Halcion or triazolam, an insomnia drug
- Halcyon (disambiguation)
- Halcyon Days (disambiguation)
