= Alcyone (ship) =

Several vessels have been named Alcyone (or Alcione):

- Alcyone (1810 ship) Alcyone was launched in 1810 at Kingston-on-Hull. She spent much of her career as a merchantman sailing across the Atlantic. She suffered a major grounding in 1824. Circa 1827 Alcyone sailed to India under a licence from the British East India Company (EIC). After her one voyage to India, Alcyone traded to the Baltic and to North and Central America. In 1844–1845 she participated in the guano rush at Ichaboe Island. She was last listed in 1847.
- Alcyone (1814 ship) was launched in France in 1810 and under another name. She was taken in prize. Waters & Co. purchased her in 1814 and renamed her. She initially sailed to Asia and India under a licence from the British East India Company. She then sailed between London and the Cape of Good Hope. She was last listed in 1824.
- Alcyone (1985 ship) is a ship launched at La Rochelle in 1985 for the Cousteau Society. Alcyone was created as an expedition ship and to test the operation of a new kind of marine propulsion system, the turbosail. Alcyone's two turbosails augment its diesel engines. Since the accidental sinking of Calypso, Alcyone has been the Cousteau Society's expedition vessel.

== See also ==
- USS Alcyone, U.S. Navy ship
