= Mokhov =

Mokhov (Russian: Мохов, from мох meaning moss), female form Mokhova is a Russian surname.

Notable people with this surname include:

- Viktor Mokhov (born 1950), Russian criminal
- Mokhov (musician), stage name of Oleg Mokhov, Russian-born American electronic music producer
