= Whirlwind, West Virginia =

- Unincorporated community
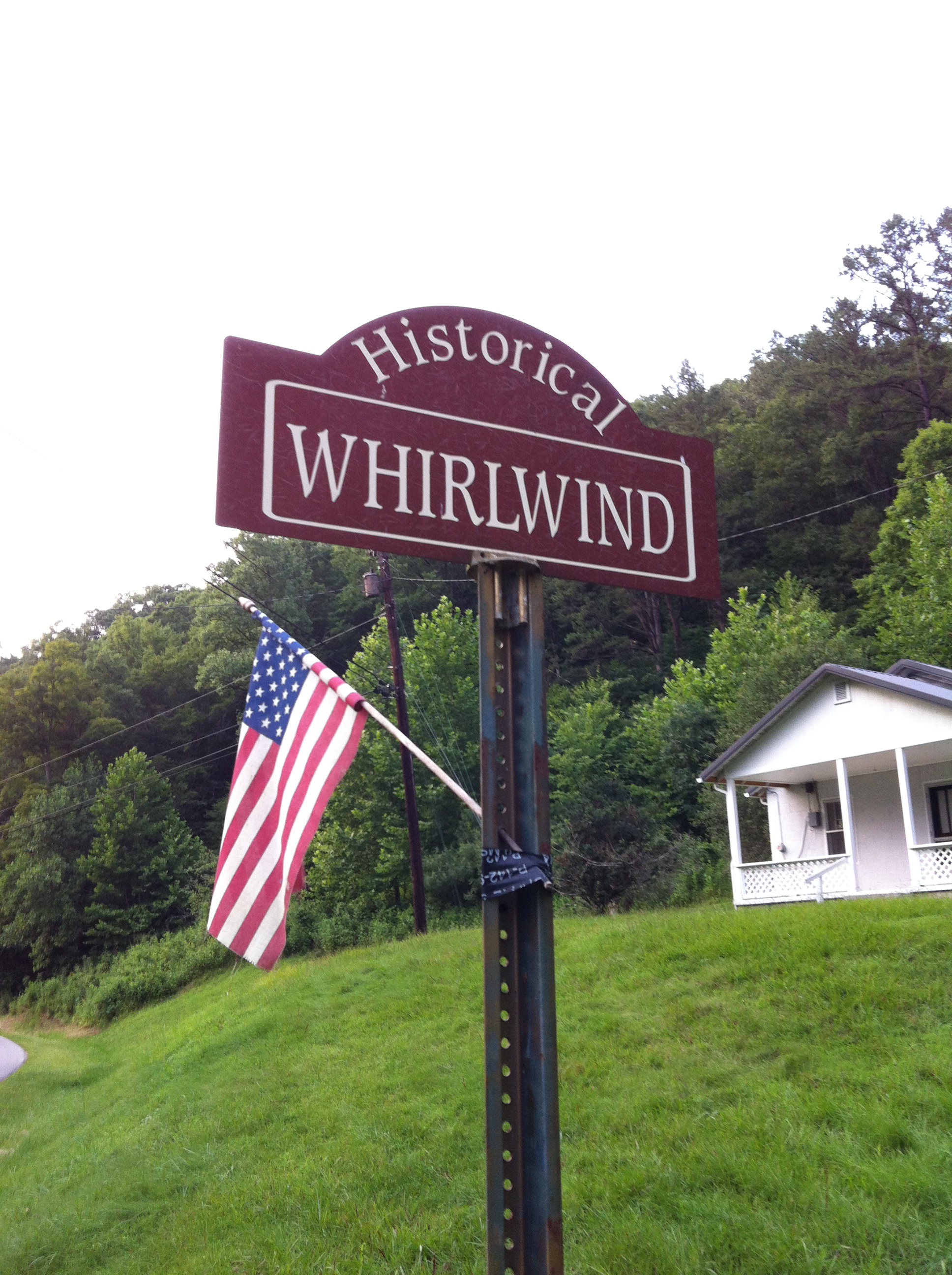
- Whirlwind Historical Sign, 2014

- Location within West Virginia Location within the United States
- Coordinates: 37°55′38″N 82°8′34″W
- Country: United States
- State: West Virginia
- County: Logan
- Elevation: 728 ft (222 m)
- Time zone: UTC-5 (Eastern (EST))
  - Summer (DST): UTC-4 (EDT)
- GNIS ID: 1742641

Whirlwind is an unincorporated community on Big Harts Creek in Logan County, West Virginia, United States.

== Location ==
The community of Whirlwind includes the headwaters of upper main Big Harts Creek, including the following tributaries: Henderson Branch, Lambert Branch, Bulwark Branch, Brier Branch, Tomblin Branch, and Collins Branch.

== History ==
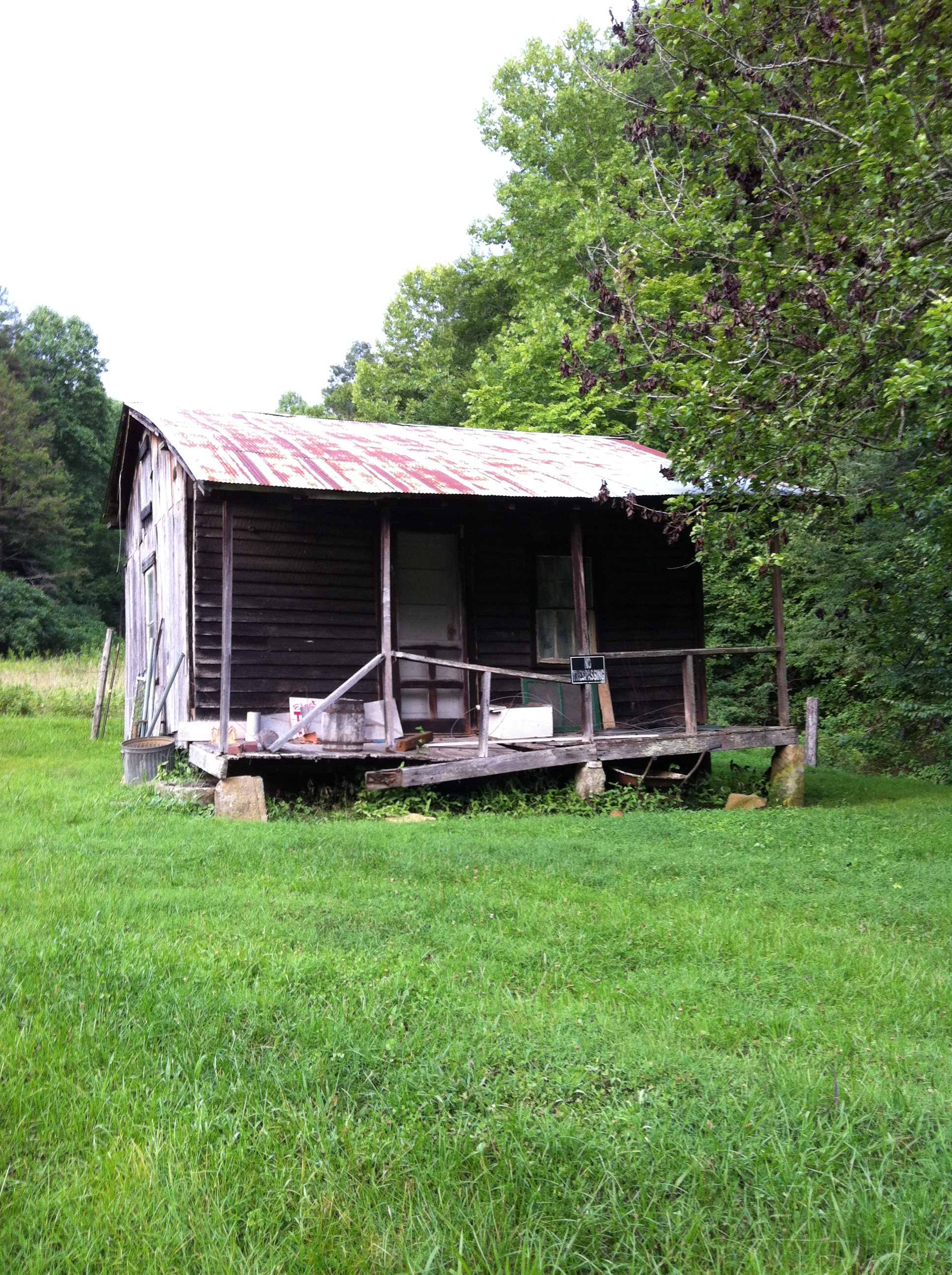
Old residence at Whirlwind, WV, 2014

Primary settlers of Upper Hart included the following families: Adams, Blair, Collins, Dalton, Farley, Mullins, Smith, Tomblin, and Workman.

According to local legend, some type of skirmish occurred at the mouth of Bulwark during the Civil War.

== Post Office ==
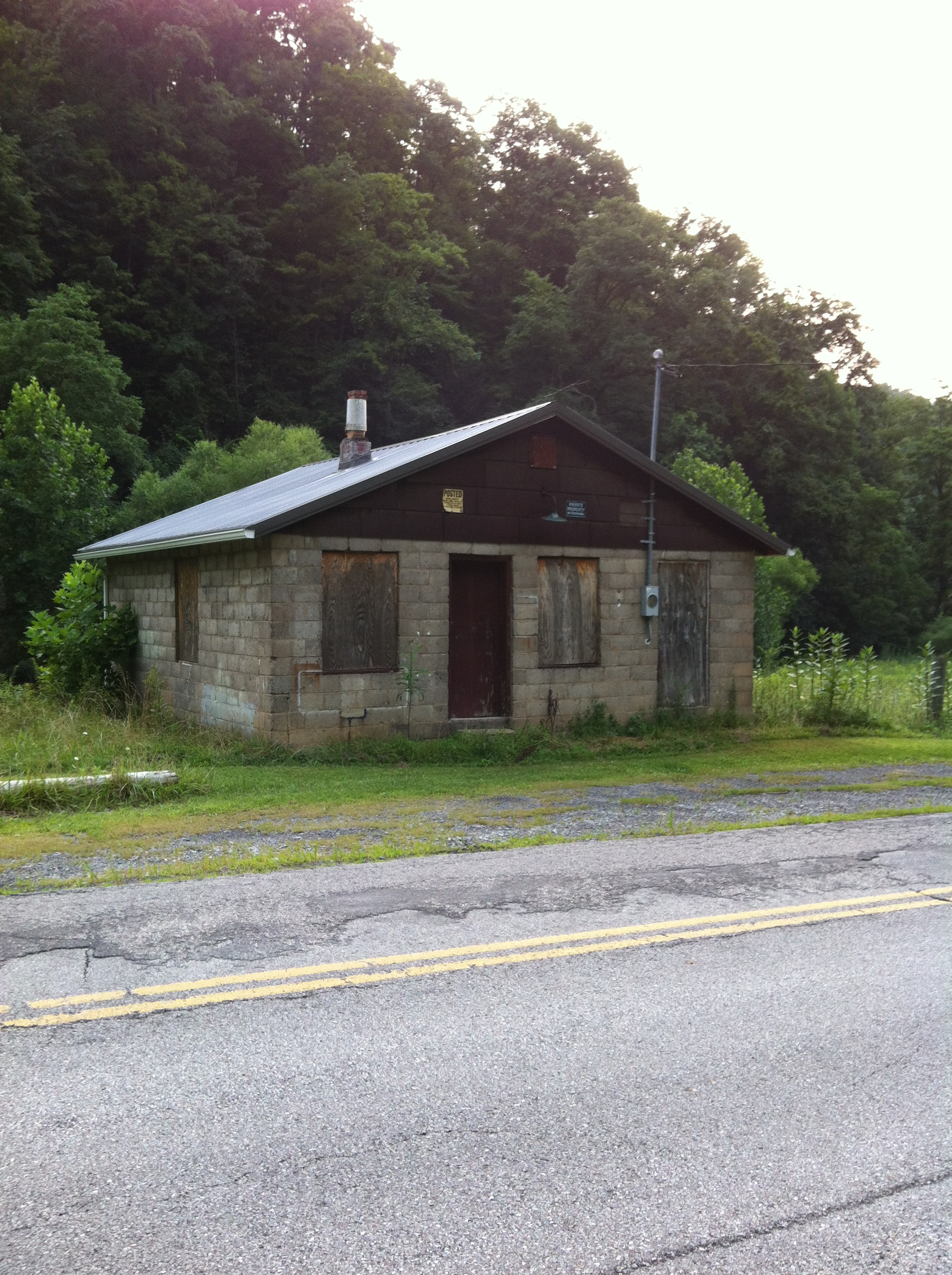
The last Whirlwind Post Office building, 2014

L.W. Riddle petitioned the Postmaster General in 1908 for the creation of a post office called Zama, located six miles northwest of McCloud Post Office and seven miles south of Dingess. The total population to be supplied with mail was 200. In January 1909, the First Assistant Postmaster General responded in a letter that marked out Zama and replaced it with Whirlwind. The proposed post office was located three miles west of the Norfolk and Western Railway, eight miles east of the Guyandotte River, and twenty feet west of Big Harts Creek. L.W. Riddle became postmaster of Whirlwind on March 31, 1910; he was replaced by Sol Riddle on May 25, 1911. On April 30, 1914, James Mullins was confirmed as postmaster; he assumed charge on May 23, 1914.

On April 28, 1938, Lindsey Blair was confirmed as postmaster; he assumed charge on May 11, 1938. Shirley Smith assumed charge on October 23, 1940 and became acting postmaster on October 26, 1940. On October 29, 1940, Shirley Smith requested the post office to be relocated to a spot 5/10 of a mile southeast from the old location, fourteen miles from the Guyandotte River, 100 feet west of Harts Creek, nine miles southwest of Dingess, twelve miles southeast of Verdunville, ten miles north of Harts, and fourteen miles from Logan. She asked the post office be relocated "so I can take care of it at my own home." Twenty-eight patrons resided within a one mile radius. Shirley Smith was confirmed as postmaster on December 5, 1940 and assumed charge of the post office on January 1, 1941. Pearl Lowe assumed charge on July 12, 1941. She wrote a letter to the Postmaster General requesting the post office be moved one mile north from its present location. It would be located ten miles from the Guyandotte River, about 40 feet west of Harts Creek, nine miles southwest from Dingess, nine miles south of Verdunville, ten miles away from Chapmanville, and two miles southwest of the county line. Pearl Lowe became acting postmaster on September 19, 1941, was confirmed on November 5, 1941, and assumed charge on January 23, 1942. On July 6, 1942, Pearl Lowe requested the post office be relocated to a new site eleven miles northeast of Harts, nine miles southwest of Dingess, twelve miles southeast of Verdunville, 300 feet east of Harts Creek, and 1/8 mile from the old post office. On July 15, 1944, an unnamed person requested it be relocated 1/4 mile south of the old post office, two miles from Mingo County, about 40 feet east of Harts Creek, thirteen miles east of Guyandotte River, nine miles southwest of Dingess, eleven miles south of Verdunville, ten miles north of Harts, and thirteen miles northeast of Chapmanville. Tema Workman assumed charge of the post office on March 1, 1947. On April 22, 1947, Tema Workman requested the post office be relocated to a site one mile north of its old site. Her letter references Bulwark as another name for the community. The new site would be 8 1/10 miles northeast of Shively, 7 1/2 miles south of Dingess, 9 1/2 miles north of Harts, 10 8/10 miles southeast of Verdunville, and 1 1/2 mile from Mingo County. Tema Workman assumed charge on October 1, 1947. Verlie Smith assumed charge of the post office on November 5, 1949 and served as acting postmaster on November 15, 1949. A November 16, 1949 letter moved the post office once again, this time to a location one mile southeast of the old site, 8 1/2 miles north of Harts, ten miles south of Dingess, 6 1/2 miles east of Shively, fourteen miles west of Kirk, and two miles from the Mingo County line.

On March 31, 1951, Ernestine Tomblin assumed charge of the post office and became acting postmaster on April 17, 1951. Whirlwind Post Office was discontinued on January 5, 1952, effective January 31, 1952, mail to Harts.

== Economy ==
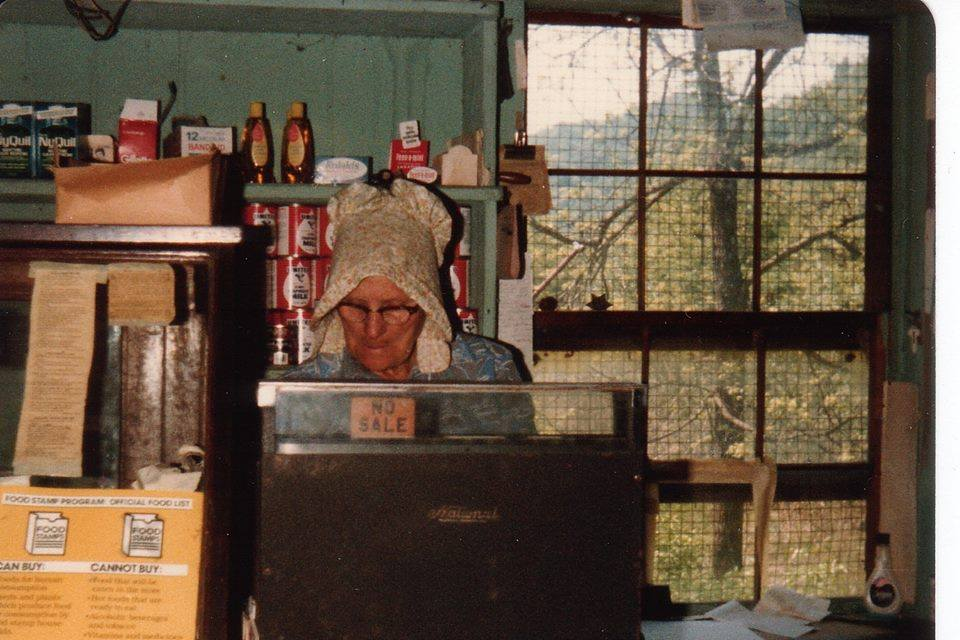
Della Tomblin in her store at Whirlwind, WV

Timbering served as the community's primary industry. The community benefited by its close proximity to Dingess, a busy town situated along the Norfolk and Western Railway on Twelve Pole Creek. As recently as the 1990s, the community had a gas station, grocery store, and a kennel. A butcher shop exists on Henderson Branch.

== Churches ==
Hannah United Baptist Church was established at Whirlwind in the 1950s. The church is named for Hannah (Pack) Tomblin. Hoover Church, relocated from Hoover Fork, is now located in Whirlwind.

== Education ==
Several one-room schools once served the community. Later, the community was served by a brick two-story school. Today, local children attend Hugh Dingess Elementary School, Chapmanville Middle School, and Chapmanville Regional High School.

== Public works ==
Main Harts Volunteer Fire Department is located just below the mouth of Henderson Branch. Whirlwind recently received "city water."
