= Alcyon (disambiguation) =

Alcyon may refer to:

== Aircraft ==
- Morane-Saulnier Alcyon, a French trainer introduced in 1949

== Companies ==
- Alcyon a French bicycle, car and motorcycle manufacturer in business 1903–54

== Ships ==
- French destroyer L'Alcyon, a L'Adroit-class destroyer in service with the French Navy 1929–52
- FV Alcyon, a French fishing trawler in service 1904–40, requisitioned by the Kriegsmarine and served as the harbour defence boat Boot 10 Alcyon 1940–41, and the vorpostenboot V 420 Alcyon 1941–43

== See also ==
- Alcyone (disambiguation)
