= List of shipwrecks in December 1824 =

The list of shipwrecks in December 1824 includes some ships sunk, foundered, grounded, or otherwise lost during December 1824.

== 1 December ==
List of shipwrecks: 1 December 1824
Ship	State	Description
Industry	United Kingdom	The sloop was driven ashore and wrecked at Lossiemouth, Morayshire. She was on a voyage from Newport, Monmouthshire to Leith, Lothian.
Leonora	Netherlands	The galiot was driven ashore and wrecked at Weymouth, Dorset, United Kingdom with the loss of all hands. She was on a voyage from Vigo, Spain to Hamburg.
Live Oak	United Kingdom	The ship was wrecked near Harbour Island, Bahamas. She was on a voyage from Gibraltar to Havana, Cuba.
Phillis	United Kingdom	The ship was driven on to the Mile House Rocks, Lancashire. She was on a voyage from Belfast, County Antrim to Liverpool, Lancashire.

== 2 December ==
List of shipwrecks: 2 December 1824
Ship	State	Description
Frances	United Kingdom	The ship was lost in the Irish Sea off Bray Head, County Wicklow. Her crew were rescued. She was on a voyage from Wicklow to Liverpool, Lancashire.
Frederick	United Kingdom	The ship was driven ashore at Caister-on-Sea, Norfolk Her crew were rescued.
Goede Hoop	Netherlands	The ship was wrecked near Heligoland. She was on a voyage from Antwerp to Hamburg.
Mary & Elizabeth	United Kingdom	The ship was wrecked on Scroby Sands, Norfolk. She was on a voyage from Hull, Yorkshire to Sierra Leone.
Rebecca	United Kingdom	The ship was wrecked at Sandy Hook, New Jersey, United States. She was on a voyage from the West Indies to Halifax, Nova Scotia, British North America.
Vine	United Kingdom	The schooner was wrecked on the Haisborough Sands, in the North Sea off the coast of Norfolk with the ultimate loss of two of her six crew. Three survivors were rescued by Ocean (United Kingdom). Ocean was on a voyage from Sunderland, County Durham to Rotterdam, South Holland, Netherlands.

== 3 December ==
List of shipwrecks: 3 December 1824
Ship	State	Description
Hawk	United Kingdom	The ship was run down and sunk in the North Sea off Patrington, Yorkshire by Resolution (United States). She was on a voyage from London to Leeds, Yorkshire.

== 4 December ==
List of shipwrecks: 4 December 1824
Ship	State	Description
Catharine	United Kingdom	The ship sprang a leak and was beached at Bridlington, North Riding of Yorkshire, where she was wrecked.
Speculator	United Kingdom	The ship capsized in the Atlantic Ocean 30 leagues (90 nautical miles (170 km)) west south west of the Isles of Scilly with the loss of four of her seven crew. Survivors were rescued by Sisters (Norway).

== 5 December ==
List of shipwrecks: 5 December 1824
Ship	State	Description
Commercial Packet	United Kingdom	The ship was lost at Ardmore Isle of Skye. She was on a voyage from Kirkwall, Orkney Islands to Newry, County Antrim.
Desorveldegheyd	Netherlands	The ship was wrecked near Vigo, Spain. She was on a voyage from Faro, Portugal to Ostend, West Flanders.
Lady Ann	United Kingdom	The ship was wrecked on the north coast of the Isle of Bute. Her crew were rescued. She was on a voyage from Ayr to Greenock, Renfrewshire.
Ranger	United Kingdom	The ship ran aground on a sandbank off the Water of Ugie and was severely damaged. She was on a voyage from Peterhead, Aberdeenshire to Liverpool, Lancashire. Ranger was refloated and taken in to Peterhead.
Trial	(United Kingdom of Great Britain and Ireland) British North America	The schooner was driven ashore on Pinckney Point, Nova Scotia. Her crew were rescued.

== 6 December ==
List of shipwrecks: 6 December 1824
Ship	State	Description
Agenoria	United Kingdom	The ship was driven ashore and severely damaged at Brighton, Sussex. She was later refloated.
Diligence	United Kingdom	The ship was driven ashore and wrecked at Hastings, Sussex. Her crew were rescued.
Isabella	United Kingdom	The ship was driven ashore and wrecked at Brighton.
Janus	United Kingdom	The ship was abandoned in the Atlantic Ocean. Her crew were rescued by Minerva (United Kingdom). Janus was subsequently taken in to the Isles of Scilly, where she arrived on 27 December.
Spartan	United Kingdom	The ship was wrecked on the Kentish Knock, in the North Sea off Margate, Kent. Her crew were rescued. She was on a voyage from Saint John, New Brunswick, British North America to Sunderland, County Durham.
Sussex	United Kingdom	The ship was driven ashore and wrecked at Brighton.

== 7 December ==
List of shipwrecks: 7 December 1824
Ship	State	Description
Abram & Ann	United Kingdom	The ship was wrecked at the Giants Causeway, County Antrim with the loss of all hands.
Frederick William	United Kingdom	The ship sprang a leak in the North Sea off the Galloper Sandbank and was beached at Lowestoft, Suffolk.
Jane	United Kingdom	The ship was driven ashore south of Helsingborg, Sweden. She was on a voyage from Memel, Prussia to Kirkcaldy, Fife.
Protector	United Kingdom	The coaster was run into by Jane (United Kingdom) at Limerick and sank.

== 8 December ==
List of shipwrecks: 8 December 1824
Ship	State	Description
Christian and Elizabeth	Sweden	The ship was abandoned by her crew, She came ashore near Cape Wrath, Sutherland, United Kingdom on 11 December. She was on a voyage from Dublin, United Kingdom to Stockholm.
Henrietta Louisa	Rostock	The ship was wrecked at Riga, Russia. Her crew were rescued.
Prompt	United Kingdom	The smack foundered in the North Sea off Orfordness, Suffolk. Her crew were rescued. She was on a voyage from Leith, Lothian to London.

== 9 December ==
List of shipwrecks: 9 December 1824
Ship	State	Description
Alabama	United States	The ship was driven ashore at Alvarado, Mexico. She was on a voyage from Philadelphia, Pennsylvania to Alvrado.
Albion	United Kingdom	The ship was wrecked on the Owers Rocks, in the English Channel off the coast of Sussex. Her crew survived. She was on a voyage from Sunderland, County Durham to Plymouth, Devon.
Blucher	United Kingdom	The ship was driven ashore at Hellevoetsluis, South Holland, Netherlands.
Milburn	United Kingdom	The ship was lost in the North Sea off the coast of Norfolk.

== 12 December ==
List of shipwrecks: 12 December 1824
Ship	State	Description
Eagle	United Kingdom	The ship was destroyed by fire at Saint John, New Brunswick, British North America with the loss of a crew member.

== 13 December ==
List of shipwrecks: 13 December 1824
Ship	State	Description
Ceres	United Kingdom	The ship struck Alden's Rock and sank. She was on a voyage from St. Ubes, Portugal to Portland, Dorset.
Eleanora	United Kingdom	The ship was driven ashore at Memel, Prussia.
Henry	United Kingdom	The ship was driven ashore at Memel.
Midas	(United Kingdom of Great Britain and Ireland) Trinidad	The schooner was driven ashore at St. Philip's Castle, Menorca, Spain.
North Star	United Kingdom	The ship was driven ashore and wrecked on Colonsay, Inner Hebrides. Her crew were rescued. She was on a voyage from Westport, County Mayo to Liverpool, Lancashire.
Petersburg	United Kingdom	The ship was driven ashore at Memel.
Tartar	United Kingdom	The ship was driven ashore and wrecked at Memel.

== 14 December ==
List of shipwrecks: 14 December 1824
Ship	State	Description
Betsey	United Kingdom	The ship was lost at Thisted, Denmark.
Demerara	United Kingdom	The ship was driven ashore and wrecked in Bantry Bay. Her crew were rescued. She was on a voyage from London to Limerick.
Horace	United States	The ship sprang a leak and was abandoned. She was on a voyage from the Kennebec River to Jamaica.
Morning Star	United States	The ship was wrecked on Isla Aves, Gran Colombia. She was on a voyage from New York to Caracas, Gran Colombia.

== 18 December ==
List of shipwrecks: 18 December 1824
Ship	State	Description
La Bonne Societé	France	The chasse-marée was abandoned in the North Sea. She was subsequently taken in to Veere, Zeeland, Netherlands.
Leander	United Kingdom	The ship was wrecked at Mizen Head, County Cork. All on board were rescued. She was on a voyage from New Orleans, Louisiana to Liverpool, Lancashire.

== 19 December ==
List of shipwrecks: 19 December 1824
Ship	State	Description
Fortuna	Netherlands	The galiot was driven ashore and wrecked at Portland, Dorset, United Kingdom. Her crew were rescued, She was on a voyage from Porto, Portugal to Amsterdam, North Holland.

== 20 December ==
List of shipwrecks: 20 December 1824
Ship	State	Description
Aran	Denmark	The ship was driven ashore at Copenhagen. She was on a voyage from Copenhagen to London, United Kingdom.
Blucher	United States	The ship foundered in the Atlantic Ocean. All 23 people on board took to a lifeboat and were rescued six days later by Henry and Isabella (United Kingdom):. Blucher was on a voyage from Liverpool, Lancashire, United Kingdom to Savannah, Georgia.
Ceres	United Kingdom	The ship was driven ashore and wrecked at Helsingør, Denmark. Her crew survived. She was on a voyage from Danzig to Aberdeen.
Clementina	United Kingdom	The ship foundered in the North Sea off the coast of Lincolnshire. Her crew were rescued by William and Ann (United Kingdom). She was on a voyage from Wells-next-the-Sea, Norfolk to Leeds, Yorkshire.
Dale	United Kingdom	The ship was driven ashore and wrecked at Holyhead, Anglesey. Her crew were rescued. She was on a voyage from Saint John, New Brunswick, British North America to the Clyde.
Elizabeth	United Kingdom	The ship was driven ashore near Troon, Ayrshire. Her crew were rescued by the Troon Lifeboat. Elizabeth was on a voyage from Ayr to Greenock, Renfrewshire.
Favourite	United Kingdom	The pilot boat foundered in the English Channel off the Isle of Wight.
Lady Arabella	United Kingdom	The ship was driven ashore at Helsingør. She was consequently condemned.
Manchester	United Kingdom	The ship was driven ashore at Helsingør. She was on a voyage from "Wyburg" to Hull, Yorkshire. Manchester was consequently condemned.
Palmyra	United Kingdom	The ship was driven ashore and wrecked near Dover, Kent. Her crew were rescued. She was on a voyage from Saint-Domingue to London.
Sandica Connica	Portugal	The ship was driven ashore and wrecked near Pyle, Glamorgan, United Kingdom. Her crew were rescued. She was on a voyage from Terceira Island, Azores to Bristol, Gloucestershire.

== 21 December ==
List of shipwrecks: 21 December 1824
Ship	State	Description
Abbey	United Kingdom	The steamship was driven ashore in Carnarvon Bay.
Cato	United Kingdom	The ship struck the pier and sank at Ramsgate, Kent. She was on a voyage from "St. David's" to Plymouth, Devon.
Dykes	United Kingdom	The brig was driven ashore between Cardiff, Glamorgan and Newport, Monmouthshire. She was on a voyage from Saint John, New Brunswick, British North America to Newport. Dykes was later refloated and put into Newport.
Experiment	United Kingdom	The ship was driven ashore and wrecked near Leith, Lothian. She was on a voyage from Peterhead, Aberdeenshire to Greenock, Renfrewshire.
Fame	United Kingdom	The ship ran aground on the Stanford Bank, in the North Sea. She was on a voyage from Stralsund, Sweden to Bristol, Gloucestershire. Fame was refloated the next day and beached at Lowestoft, Suffolk. Her crew were rescued.
Favourite	United Kingdom	The pilot boat foundered in the English Channel off the south coast of the Isle of Wight. All on board were rescued.
Harmony	United Kingdom	The ship was driven ashore and wrecked in Bigbury Bay. Her crew were rescued.
Uranie	France	The ship ran aground at Havre de Grâce, Seine-Inférieure and was abandoned by her crew. She was on a voyage from Martinique to Havre de Grâce. Uranie was later taken in to Havre de Grâce.
Vennerne	Norway	The ship was driven ashore in Aberlady Bay. She was on a voyage from "Dram" to Leith. Vennerne was refloated on 24 December and taken in to "Morrison's Harbour".
Vrow Janna	Netherlands	The ship was driven ashore. She was on a voyage from Amsterdam, North Holland to Hull, Yorkshire, United Kingdom. Vrow Janna had been refloated by 24 December and beached near Wieringen, North Holland.

== 22 December ==
List of shipwrecks: 22 December 1824
Ship	State	Description
Acorn	United Kingdom	The collier was driven ashore between Hartlepool and Sunderland, County Durham.
Ann	(United Kingdom of Great Britain and Ireland) Jersey	The ship was wrecked on Scroby Sands, Norfolk. Her crew were rescued.
Ann and Mary	United Kingdom	The ship was abandoned in the North Sea off Hartlepool.
Anne's Resolution	United Kingdom	The collier was driven ashore between Hartlepool and Sunderland.
Anne	United Kingdom	The sloop was driven ashore and wrecked near Southerness, Cumberland. Her crew survived.
Briton	United Kingdom	The ship was driven onto the Foreness Rock, Margate, Kent and sank. She had been refloated by 30 December and taken in to Margate.
Belfast	United Kingdom	The collier was driven ashore between Hartlepool and Sunderland.
Brasch	United Kingdom	The collier was driven ashore between Hartlepool and Sunderland. She was refloated on 4 January 1825 and taken in to the River Tees.
Caroline	United Kingdom	The collier was driven ashore between Hartlepool and Sunderland.
Clio	United Kingdom	The ship was driven ashore between Hartlepool and Sunderland.
Diana	United Kingdom	The ship was driven ashore at Belfast, County Antrim.
Friendship	United Kingdom	The ship was driven ashore near Winterton-on-Sea, Norfolk. Her crew were rescued.
Industry	United Kingdom	The schooner was driven ashore at Margate. She was later refloated.
Irish Miner	United Kingdom	The ship was driven ashore at Penmenever Point, Pembrokeshire. She was on a voyage from Cork to Liverpool, Lancashire. Irish Miner was refloated on 24 December and taken in to Fishguard, Pembrokeshire.
John	United Kingdom	The collier was driven ashore between Hartlepool and Sunderland. She was refloated on 4 January 1825 and taken in to the River Tees.
Leo and Ellen	United Kingdom	The ship was driven ashore at Bridlington, Yorkshire.
Maxwell	United Kingdom	The schooner was driven ashore at Ballyferns Point, 4 nautical miles (7.4 km) south of Donaghadee, County Antrim. She was on a voyage from Waterford to London. Maxwell had been refloated by 1 January 1825 and taken in to Wexford.
Milo	United Kingdom	The collier was driven ashore between Hartlepool and Sunderland. She was refloated on 4 January 1825 and taken in to the River Tees.
Phœnix	United Kingdom	The ship was driven ashore 4 nautical miles (7.4 km) north of Donaghadee. All on board were rescued. She was on a voyage from Greenock to Liverpool, Lancashire.
Providence	United Kingdom	The ship was driven ashore and wrecked at Mundesley, Norfolk. Her crew were rescued. She was on a voyage from London to Leeds, Yorkshire.
Queen of Brixham	United Kingdom	The schooner was driven ashore at Margate. She was later refloated.
Rebecca	United Kingdom	The ship was lost near Wexford. All on board were rescued. She was on a voyage from the Clyde to Jamaica.
Regent	United Kingdom	The brig sank at Margate. She had been refloated by 3 January 1825.
Release	United Kingdom	The ship was driven ashore and wrecked near Hartlepool.
Sceptre	United Kingdom	The ship was driven ashore at Pevensey, Sussex. She was on a voyage from Gibraltar to London.
Spring	United Kingdom	The ship was driven ashore at Winterton-on-Sea. Her crew were rescued.
Sylvan	United Kingdom	The ship was driven ashore between Hartlepool and Sunderland.
Thomas	United Kingdom	The collier was driven ashore between Hartlepool and Sunderland.
Venus	United Kingdom	The ship was driven ashore at Poole, Dorset.
William and Mary	United Kingdom	The collier was driven ashore between Hartlepool and Sunderland.

== 23 December ==
List of shipwrecks: 23 December 1824
Ship	State	Description
Ann and Mary	United Kingdom	The ship was abandoned in the North Sea off Hartlepool, County Durham.
George & Ellen	United Kingdom	The ship was driven ashore near Barmston, Yorkshire. Her crew were rescued. She was refloated on 6 January 1825.
Humber	United Kingdom	The ship was driven ashore at North Somercotes, Lincolnshire. Her crew were rescued. She was on a voyage from London to Hull, Yorkshire.
Isabella	United Kingdom	The ship was driven ashore near Warkworth, Northumberland, She was on a voyage from Saint Petersburg, Russia to Greenock, Renfrewshire.
Lady Mary Pelham	United Kingdom	The ship was wrecked on the coast of Brazil She was on a voyage from Buenos Aires, Argentina to Havana, Cuba.
Sylph	United Kingdom	The ship was driven ashore 8 nautical miles (15 km) south of Portishead, Somerset. She was on a voyage from Prince Edward Island, British North America to Bristol, Gloucestershire. Sylph had been refloated by 8 January 1825 and taken in to Bristol.
Vriendschap	Netherlands	The ship was driven ashore and wrecked on Eierland, North Holland with the loss of a crew member. She was on a voyage from Batavia, Netherlands East Indies to Amsterdam, North Holland

== 24 December ==
List of shipwrecks: 24 December 1824
Ship	State	Description
Amphion	Netherlands	The galiot foundered in the North Sea off Ostend, West Flanders with the loss of all hands. She was on a voyage from Bordeaux, Gironde, France to Antwerp.
Decatur	United States	The ship was driven ashore on Barbuda and was then destroyed by fire. She was on a voyage from Portland, Oregon to Guadeloupe.
Hull	United Kingdom	The ship was driven ashore in the Stör. She was on a voyage from Hamburg to Hull, Yorkshire. Hull was later refloated.
Walrus	United Kingdom	The ship was lost on the coast of Norway. Her crew were rescued. She was on a voyage from Tromsø, Norway to London.

== 25 December ==
List of shipwrecks: 25 December 1824
Ship	State	Description
Alcyone	United Kingdom	The ship sank at Liverpool, Lancashire. She was on a voyage from Saint John, New Brunswick, British North America to Liverpool. Alcyone was refloated on 7 January 1825 and taken in to Hoylake, Lancashire.
Draco	United States	The ship was driven ashore in the River Plate. She was on a voyage from Boston, Massachusetts to the River Plate. Draco was consequently condemned.
Jane & Mary	United Kingdom	The ship was driven ashore on the Langlutzen Sand, in the North Sea. She was on a voyage from London to Hamburg. Salvage was abandoned on 2 January 1825.
Mary	United Kingdom	The ship foundered in te North Sea off Dunkirk, Nord, France with the loss of all hands. She was on a voyage from Sunderland, County Durham to Poole, Dorset.
Nelson	United Kingdom	The ship was driven ashore near Saint-Vaast-la-Hougue, Manche, France. She was on a voyage from Pictou, Nova Scotia, British North America to Poole, Dorset.
Nestor	United Kingdom	The ship was driven ashore on Long Island, New York, United States. All on board were rescued. She was on a voyage from Liverpool, Lancashire to New York City.
Panopea	United States	The ship was wrecked on Grand Turk. She was on a voyage from Charleston, South Carolina to Jamaica.
Perran	United Kingdom	The ship was wrecked near Worms Head, Glamorgan. Her crew were rescued. She was on a voyage from Waterford to Southampton, Hampshire.
Prince George	Hamburg	The ship was wrecked at Tenerife, Canary Islands. She was on a voyage from Havana, Cuba to Hamburg.
Tay	United Kingdom	The ship was driven ashore at the mouth of the River Tees.
Trio	United Kingdom	The ship was driven ashore near Hartlepool, County Durham.

== 26 December ==
List of shipwrecks: 26 December 1824
Ship	State	Description
Ability	United Kingdom	The ship was wrecked near Bude, Cornwall with the loss of all hands. She was on a voyage from Cork to Penzance, Cornwall.
Favourite	United Kingdom	The ship was driven ashore in Laggan Bay.
Friendship	United Kingdom	The ship was driven ashore at Liverpool, Lancashire. Her crew were rescued, She was on a voyage from Belfast, County Antrim to Liverpool.
Jane	United Kingdom	The ship was lost off Domesnes, Norway. Her crew were rescued. She was on a voyage from Leith, Lothian to Saint Petersburg, Russia.
Margaret	United Kingdom	The ship was driven ashore at Southport, Lancashire. Her crew were rescued. She was on a voyage from Belfast, County Antrim to Liverpool.
Mexico	United States	The ship was lost in the Bay of St. Rosario.
Trades	United Kingdom	The shipdeparted from Liverpool for Whitehaven, Cumberland. No further trace, presumed foundered in the Irish Sea with the loss of all hands.
Twee gebroeders	Netherlands	The ship was driven ashore and wrecked at Egmond aan Zee, North Holland with the loss of one life. She was on a voyage from Newcastle upon Tyne, Northumberland, United Kingdom to Caen, Calvados, France.

== 28 December ==
List of shipwrecks: 28 December 1824
Ship	State	Description
Alexandrine	Hamburg	The ship was driven ashore near Altenbrück, Kingdom of Hanover. She was on a voyage from Bordeaux, Gironde, France to Hamburg.
Alfred	United Kingdom	The ship was driven ashore at Hellevoetsluis, South Holland, Netherlands.
Comet	United Kingdom	The ship capsized in the Baltic Sea off Bornholm, Denmark. She was subsequently driven ashore at "Semappen", Prussia with the loss of three of her crew. Comet was on a voyage from Riga, Russia to Liverpool, Lancashire.
Gute Hoffnung	Russia	The ship was driven ashore at Landskrona, Sweden. She was on a voyage from Riga to Havre de Grâce, Seine-Inférieure, France.
Hermione	Hamburg	The ship was driven ashore near Altenbrück. She was later refloated and put into Altona for repairs.
Joseph & Ann	United Kingdom	The ship departed from Carthagena, Gran Colombia for "Cape Graciosa". No further trace, presumed foundered with the loss of all hands.
Maria Elizabeth	Hamburg	The ship was driven ashore near Altenbrück. She was on a voyage from Bordeaux to Hamburg.
Neptune	United Kingdom	The ship was driven ashore near Altenbrück. She was on a voyage from Hamburg to Liverpool, Lancashire. Neptune was later refloated and taken in to Cuxhaven for repairs.
Nestor	United Kingdom	The ship was driven ashore and wrecked on Long Island, New York. She was on a voyage from Liverpool to New York City.
William King	United States	The ship was wrecked at Washwoods, Virginia. Her crew were rescued. She was on a voyage from Charleston, South Carolina to Castine, Maine.

== 29 December ==
List of shipwrecks: 29 December 1824
Ship	State	Description
Alexander	United Kingdom	The ship was driven ashore and wrecked at Skelmorlie Point, Ayrshire with the loss of all hands.
Emanuel	United Kingdom	The brigantine ran aground on the Gaa Sand, in the mouth of the River Tay. She was refloated but consequently foundered. Her crew were rescued. Emanuel was on a voyage from Newcastle upon Tyne, Northumberland to Dundee, Forfarshire.
Hero	United Kingdom	The ship was driven ashore and wrecked in Luce Bay. Her crew were rescued. She was on a voyage from Londonderry to Liverpool, Lancashire.
Mathilde	Hamburg	The ship foundered off "Knecht". She was on a voyage from Newcastle upon Tyne to Hamburg.
Leith	United Kingdom	The schooner foundered in the Firth of Forth off Aberdour, Fife. Her crew were rescued.
Mayflower	United Kingdom	The ship was driven ashore at Larne, County Antrim. She was later refloated.
Nelly and Margaret	United Kingdom	The ship foundered off Ardrossan, Ayrshire with the loss of all hands. She was on a voyage from Troon, Ayrshire to Greenock, Renfrewshire.
Osprey	United Kingdom	The ship ran aground on the North Bank, in Liverpool Bay and was abandoned by her crew. She floated off and was driven ashore and wrecked in Bootle Bay. Osprey was on a voyage from Alexandria, Egypt to Glasgow, Renfrewshire.

== 30 December ==
List of shipwrecks: 30 December 1824
Ship	State	Description
Corvo	United States	The ship was wrecked on the English Bank, in the South Atlantic off the coast of Argentina. She was on a voyage from Cádiz, Spain to Buenos Aires, Argentina.
Imperador Alexander	Portugal	The ship was driven ashore and wrecked at Maranhão, Brazil.
Jerome Maximillian	United States	The ship came ashore crewless on Grand Turk. She was on a voyage from New York to Port-au-Prince, Haiti.
Providence	United Kingdom	The sloop was driven ashore in Roschelly Bay. Her crew were rescued.

== 31 December ==
List of shipwrecks: 31 December 1824
Ship	State	Description
Alexander	United Kingdom	The ship struck a sunken rock off Domesnes, Norway and foundered. Her crew survived. She was on a voyage from Kirkcaldy, Fife to Riga, Russia.
Prince Royal	United Kingdom	The ship was washed ashore and wrecked at Ballyteague, County Kildare. Her crew were rescued. She was on a voyage from Smyrna, Ottoman Empire to Liverpool, Lancashire.
Princess Charlotte	United Kingdom	The brig was wrecked on the Borrow of Ballyteague, County Kildare. Her crew survived.
Rose	United Kingdom	The ship was driven ashore and wrecked at Harrington, Cumberland. She was on a voyage from Belfast, County Antrim to Workington, Cumberland.

== Unknown date ==
List of shipwrecks: Unknown date in December 1824
Ship	State	Description
Achille	France	The ship was lost near Havre de Grâce, Seine-Inférieure. She was on a voyage from Saint Petersburg, Russia to Havre de Grâce.
Anna Sophia	Flag unknown	The ship was driven ashore crewless near Ventava, Courland Governorate.
Camelion	United Kingdom	The ship foundered in the Irish Sea off Holyhead, Anglesey in early December.
Catalina	Spain	The ship was wrecked on the Egg Island Reef. She was on a voyage from Principe to Havana, Cuba.
Catharina Hendrica	Rostock	The ship was lost at "Porcala", Grand Duchy of Finland on or before 20 December.
Ceres	United States	The ship was wrecked on the Dry Tortugas. Her crew were rescued.
De Vries	Netherlands	The ship foundered in the English Channel in early December. She was on a voyage from Porto, Portugal to Amsterdam, North Holland.
Eagle	United Kingdom	The ship was driven ashore at Larne, County Antrim, where she broke up on 7 December.
Fame	United Kingdom	The ship was lost in the Baltic Sea between Vyborg, Grand Duchy of Finland and Kronstadt, Russia. Her crew were rescued. She was on a voyage from Liverpool, Lancashire to Saint Petersburg.
Familie	Netherlands	The ship departed from Tönningen, Duchy of Holstein for Amsterdam in late November. No further trace, presumed foundered in the North Sea with the loss of all hands.
Frau Ann	Sweden	The ship was lost near Marstrand.
Frau Maria	Hamburg	The ship was driven ashore on Amrum, Duchy of Schleswig. She was on a voyage from Cádiz, Spain to Hamburg.
George Wilhelm	Danzig	The ship foundered in the Baltic Sea off Leba, Prussia with the loss of all hands. She was on a voyage from Danzig to London, United Kingdom.
Gulnare	United States	The ship was driven ashore on Magazine Island, Bahamas.
Helen	United Kingdom	The ship was driven ashore in Aberlady Bay.
Ibis	United Kingdom	The ship was lost near Hamina, Grand Duchy of Finland. She was on a voyage from Saint Petersburg to Plymouth, Devon.
Jeune Elise	France	The brig was abandoned in the English Channel. She was on a voyage from Cette, Hérault to Cherbourg, Seine-Inférieure. Jeune Elise was later towed in to Guernsey, Channel Islands, where she arrived on 5 December.
Jong Kuiper	Netherlands	The ship was wrecked on the coast of Jutland. She was on a voyage from Sunderland, County Durham, United Kingdom to Amsterdam, North Holland.
Joseph & John	United Kingdom	The ship sank on the Trinity Sand, in the North Sea. She was on a voyage from Wisbech, Cambridgeshire to Leeds, Yorkshire. Joseph & John was refloated on 5 January 1825 and taken in to Grimsby, Lincolnshire, where she was condemned.
Julia	United Kingdom	The sloop was lost near Port Natal, Africa. She was on a voyage from Algoa Bay to Port Natal.
Lady Kinnaird	United Kingdom	The ship was lost in late December.
Margaret	United Kingdom	The ship was driven ashore at Southport, Lancashire. Her crew were rescued, She was on a voyage from Belfast, County Antrim to Liverpool, Lancashire.
Mary and Elizabeth	United Kingdom	The ship was wrecked on Scroby Sands, Norfolk in early December. She was on a voyage from Hull, Yorkshire to Sierra Leone.
Milburn	United Kingdom	The ship was wrecked on the Haisborough Sands, in the North Sea off the coast of Norfolk.
Morgenia	Netherlands	The ship was lost near Texel, North Holland. She was on a voyage from Rotterdam, South Holland to Rostock.
Phœnix	Netherlands	The ship was wrecked near Brest, Finistère, France. She was on a voyage from Cartagena de Colombia, Gran Colombia to Antwerp.
Sandica Connica	Portugal	The schooner was driven ashore and wrecked at Sker Point, Glamorgan, United Kingdom. She was on a voyage from Terceira, Azores to Bristol, Gloucestershire, United Kingdom.
St. Paul	United Kingdom	The ship was driven ashore at Willemstad, North Brabant, Netherlands. She was on a voyage from Hull to Antwerp, Netherlands. St. Paul was later refloated and taken in to Dordrecht, South Holland for repairs.
Swift	United Kingdom	The ship was lost in the North Sea off the coast of Jutland. She was on a voyage from Föhr, Kingdom of Hanover to London.
Venus	Netherlands	The ship was lost near "Fleckeroe". She was on a voyage from Antwerp to Arbroath, Forfarshire, United Kingdom.
