= Shively, West Virginia =

- Unincorporated community
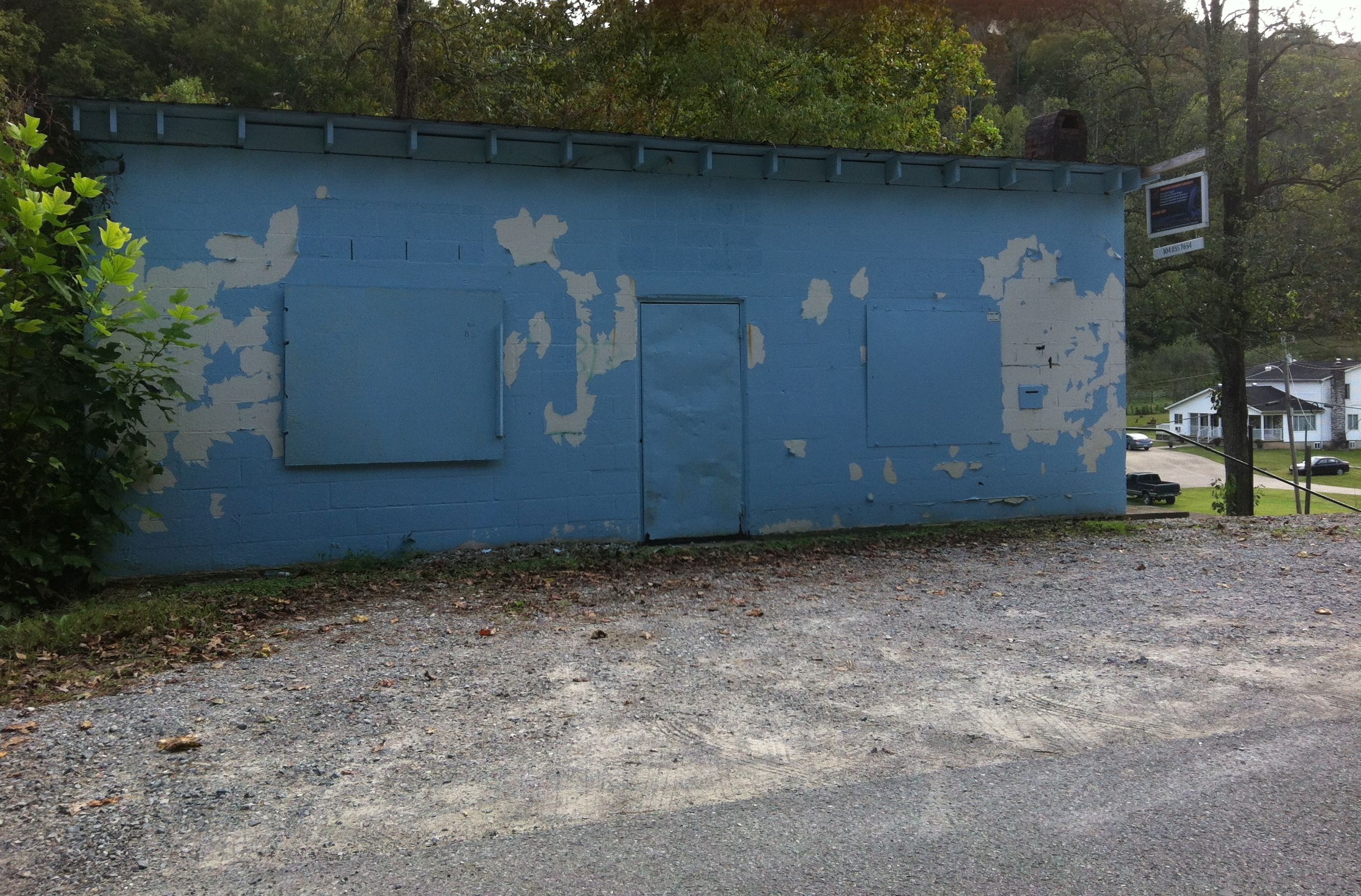
- Old Shively Post Office Building, 2016 Old Shively P.O., 2016

- Location within West Virginia Location within the United States
- Coordinates: 37°57′57″N 82°07′05″W
- Country: United States
- State: West Virginia
- County: Logan
- Elevation: 696 ft (212 m)
- Time zone: UTC-5 (Eastern (EST))
  - Summer (DST): UTC-4 (EDT)
- Area codes: 304 & 681
- GNIS feature ID: 1555614

Shively is an unincorporated community located on the Smokehouse Fork of Big Harts Creek in Logan County, West Virginia, United States. Shively is accessed by County Route 3. It is situated 7.2 miles from Harts and 9.3 miles from Chapmanville.

== Geography ==
Shively is generally understood to represent the Smokehouse Fork and Buck Fork sections of Big Harts Creek.

== History ==
Smokehouse Fork, known also in early records as the "Forks of Hart," derives its name from Stephen Hart (Heart), an early settler, or his father, who erected a smokehouse to cure venison at the mouth of the fork. Early settlers of Smokehouse and Buck forks include members of these families: Butcher, Bryant, Conley, Dingess, Elkins, Farley, Hensley, Lambert, Mullins, and Tomblin.

Key events of the Lincoln County Feud occurred at the homes of Henderson and Hugh Dingess on Smokehouse Fork in 1889. At that time, the lower section of Smokehouse Fork was included in Lincoln County.

Shively is named for Charles Nelson Shively, who settled locally from Georges Run, Ohio about 1908. The name appears on a 1910 topographic map of Big Harts Creek at the mouth of White Oak Fork of Smokehouse Fork of Big Harts Creek. Later, the name appears in the lower section of Smokehouse Fork at Wolfpen Branch where the final post office building stands today.

== Economy ==
Timbering served as the community's primary industry. During the 1880s and 1890s, Albert Dingess Sr. was a leading timberman on the fork. In the 1890s, C. Dingess & Company operated a local timber firm. Several splash dams were constructed on Smokehouse Fork.

== Post office ==
Shively Post Office was established as early as 1923. A. Butcher was postmaster in 1923–1924 and mail was received tri-weekly. Ina E. Adams served as acting postmaster beginning on December 4, 1925. She served as postmaster from January 18, 1926, to August 2, 1935. John S. Butcher assumed charge of the post office on August 2, 1935. He served as postmaster from October 25, 1935, to January 1, 1949. Sallie Farley Adkins assumed charge of the post office on January 1, 1949. She served as postmaster until her resignation on July 22, 1958. Nora St. Clair assumed charge of the post office on July 22, 1958.

== Education ==
Historically, the following schools have served the community: Browns Run School (est. 1892), Buck Fork School (est. 1894), Hugh Dingess School (est. 1897), Conley School (est. 1897), George Mullins School (est. 1910), and White Oak School (est. 1923). Only Hugh Dingess Elementary School remains open today. The 1925–1926 West Virginia Educational Directory lists a few teachers with Shively addresses: Ina Adams, Anna Butcher, and Lester H. Cross.

Today, residents of Shively attend Chapmanville School, Harts PK-8 School, Chapmanville Middle School, and Chapmanville Regional High School.

== Recent history ==
In the late twentieth century, a coal mine operated on Browns Run of Smokehouse Fork.

== Notable residents ==
- Charley Conley (1871–1919), feudist
- Floyd Dingess (1856–1888), casualty of the Lincoln County Feud
- Henderson Dingess (1829–1902), patriarch in the Lincoln County Feud
- Hollena Dingess Brumfield (1863–1937), character in the Lincoln County Feud
- Hugh Dingess (1858–1916), participant in the Lincoln County Feud and timberman
- James Burwell "Burl" Farley (1856–1937), participant in the Lincoln County Feud and timberman
- Paris Hensley (c. 1851 – 1937), preacher
- Stonewall Hensley (1893–1977), preacher
