= Alcyone (disambiguation) =

Alcyone of Thessaly was a Thessalian princess and later on queen of Trachis.

Alcyone may also refer to:

- Alcyone (star), the brightest star in the Pleiades cluster
- Alcyone (mythology), name of different individuals in mythology
- Alcyone (opera), a 1706 opera by Marin Marais
- Alcyone (Ravel cantata), a cantata by Maurice Ravel
- Alcyone (ship), any one of several vessels by that name
- Alcyone, the pseudonymous author of the book At the Feet of the Master, attributed to Jiddu Krishnamurti or C. W. Leadbeater
- Alcyone, a pseudonym of Jiddu Krishnamurti
- Subaru Alcyone, or Subaru XT, an automobile
- Alcyone, a character in Magic Knight Rayearth. Named after the Subaru Alcyone automobile

== See also ==
- Alcione (disambiguation)
- Alcyon (disambiguation)
- Halcyon (disambiguation)
