= Halcyon, West Virginia =

- Unincorporated community
- Location within West Virginia Location within the United States
- Coordinates: 37°58′47″N 82°5′37″W
- Country: United States
- State: West Virginia
- County: Logan and Lincoln
- Elevation: 735 ft (224 m)
- Time zone: UTC-5 (Eastern (EST))
  - Summer (DST): UTC-4 (EDT)
- GNIS ID: 1742534

Halcyon is an unincorporated community located on the West Fork of Big Harts Creek in Logan and Lincoln counties, West Virginia, United States.

== Geography ==
Halcyon describes the upper West Fork section of Big Harts Creek, specifically Piney Fork, Workman Fork, and Marsh Fork. The lower section of Piney is located in Lincoln County. Topographic maps for 1910 and 1912 show main West Fork originating in the head of what is today known as Workman Fork; topographic maps for 1925 and 1928 show this part of West Fork as Workman Fork. Between 1912 and 1925, then, the headwaters of main West Fork became known as Workman Fork. Workman Fork includes Long Branch. Based on the 1925 map, Marsh Fork and Workman Fork meet to form the beginning of main West Fork. However, the 1910 and 1912 maps indicate that Marsh Fork, like Long Branch, were originally considered branches of main West Fork. The primary tributaries of Marsh Fork include Thompson/Barker Hollow and Brushy Fork. The primary tributaries of Piney Fork are Rattlesnake Branch, Lick Fork, Haw Bush, and Alford Branch.

== History ==
Early pioneer settlers who arrived between 1800 and 1840 included members of the Elkins, Vance, Dingess, Thompson, and Workman families. Later settlers included members of these families: Alford, Baisden, Belcher, Bryant, Caldwell, Davis, Farley, Farmer, Farris, Fleming, Gore, Headley, Kirk, McCann, Mullins, Riddell, and Tomblin.

During the Civil War, local families supported the Confederacy.

The area hosted one minor event of the Lincoln County feud in 1889.

Polk's West Virginia State Gazetteer and Business Directory (1923-1924) identified Halcyon as consisting of 100 residents. It was situated 15 miles northwest of Logan, the county seat and banking point, three miles west of Chapmanville, the nearest shipping point, and 50 miles from Huntington.

== Economy ==
Timbering served as the community's primary industry. Albert Dingess, Jr. operated a store, gristmill, and sawmill. Polk's West Virginia State Gazetteer and Business Directory (1923-1924) identified Dingess as the owner of a general store and grist mill.

== Post office ==
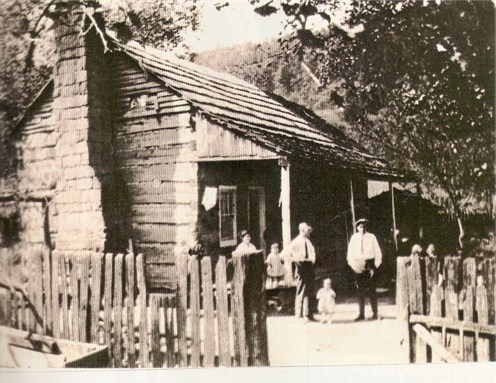
Albert Dingess log cabin

The Halcyon Post Office was established in 1906. Albert Dingess, Jr. served as postmaster from May 3, 1906 until April 20, 1921. Everett Dingess took possession of the office on April 20, 1921, served as acting postmaster from May 11, 1921, and became postmaster on September 21, 1921, holding that position until July 14, 1923. Polk's West Virginia State Gazetteer and Business Directory (1923-1924) identified Dingess as the postmaster and stated that mail was delivered tri-weekly. The post office was discontinued on July 14, 1923, its service transferred to Ferrellsburg in Lincoln County.

== Schools ==
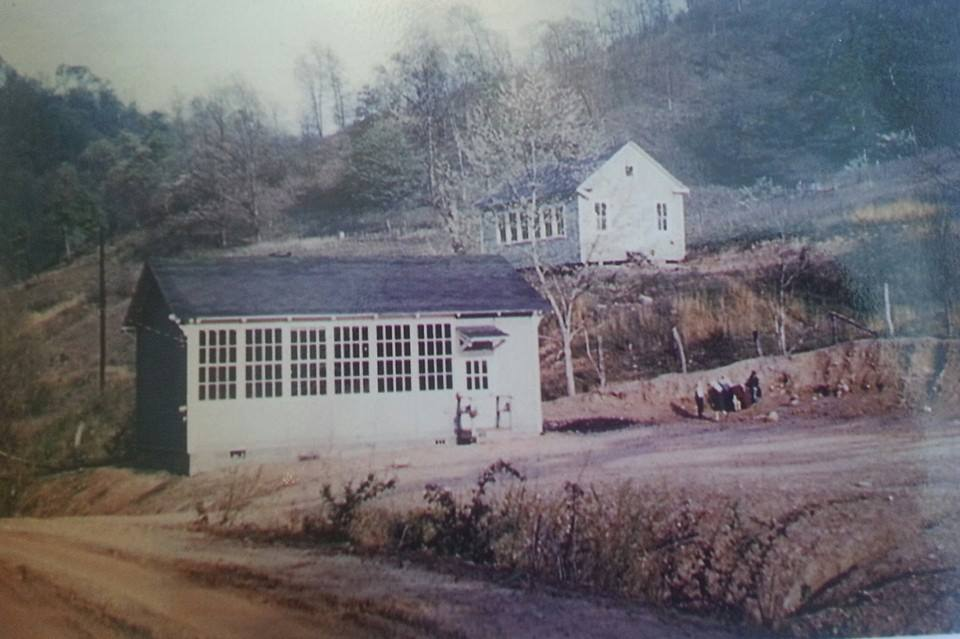
Lee Dingess School

The following schools, all located in Logan County, once served the community: Bud Dingess School, Lee Dingess School (located at Barker Hollow), Piney School, and Workman Fork School. The Piney and the Workman Fork school buildings still exist and have served as residential structures in recent decades.

== Churches ==
Workman Fork United Baptist Church was established at the mouth of Workman Fork in the early 1930s. Other churches in the area include Piney Community Church on Piney and Morning Star Church at the mouth of Brushy Hollow.

== Recent history ==
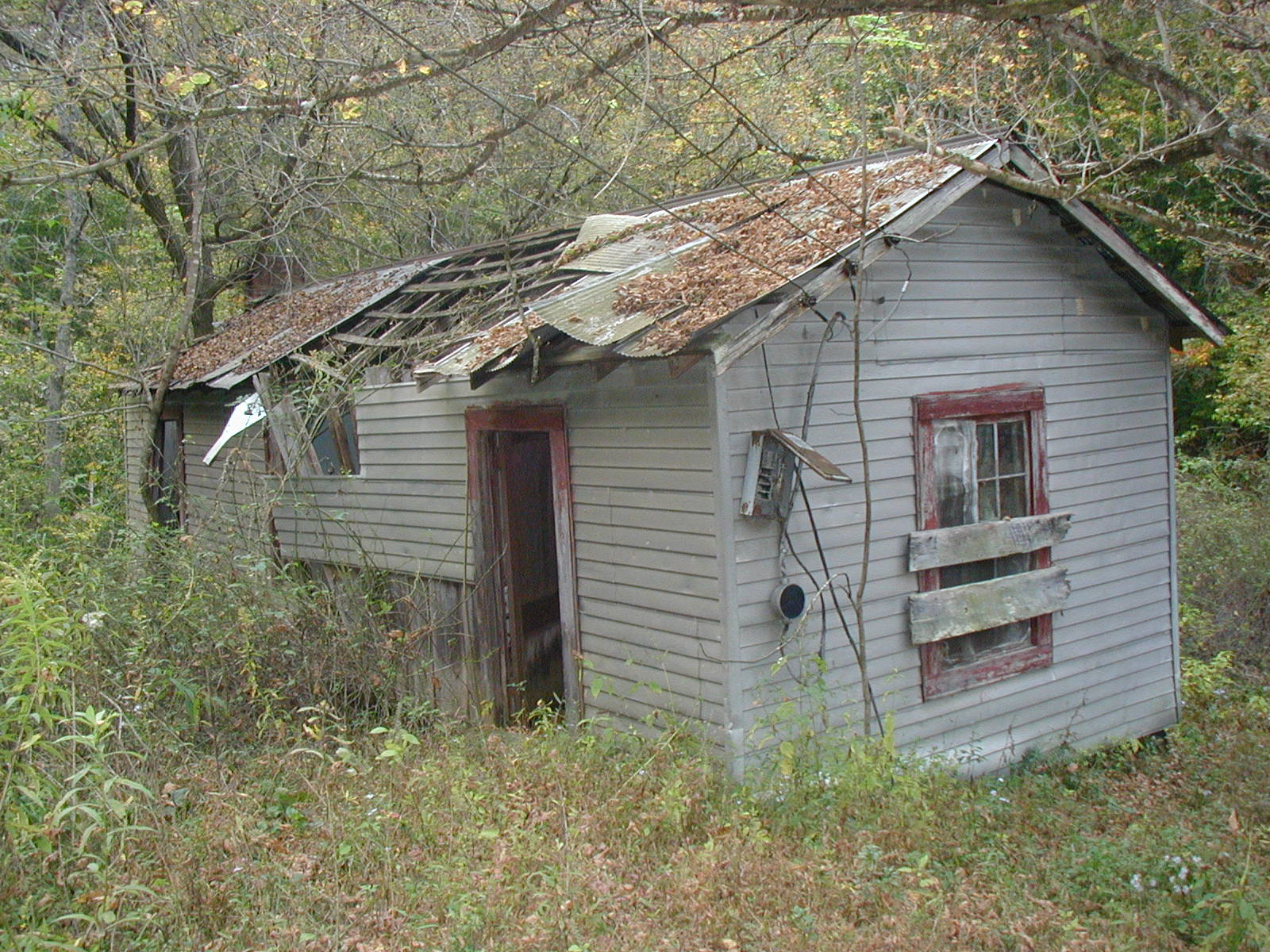
Doc Workman Home, 2003

"Punkin Center," located in the bottom between the mouth of Piney and the mouth of Workman Fork, was the location of "good time" houses.

In the early 1920s, a Bryant-Dingess feud occurred in the community. At least one person was killed in the troubles.

Electricity arrived to the community in the 1930s.

On April 19, 1956, Wilson "Doc" Workman, a World War I veteran, was murdered at his home. The case remains unsolved.

Today, Halcyon youth attend one of these schools: Chapmanville Primary School, Harts PK-8 School, Chapmanville Middle School, or Chapmanville Regional High School.

== Notable residents ==
- French Bryant (1855-1938), participant in the Lincoln County Feud
- Albert Dingess, Jr. (1882-1953), postmaster, merchant, and miller
- David C. "Dealer Dave" Dingess (born c.1857), a horse trader and fiddler
- Leander A. "Lee" Dingess (1865-1931), a law official and attorney
- John Wesley "Crockadil" Workman (1834-1912), a veteran of the Confederate States Army and mail carrier
