= Big Harts Creek =

Big Harts Creek Harts Creek, Big Hart
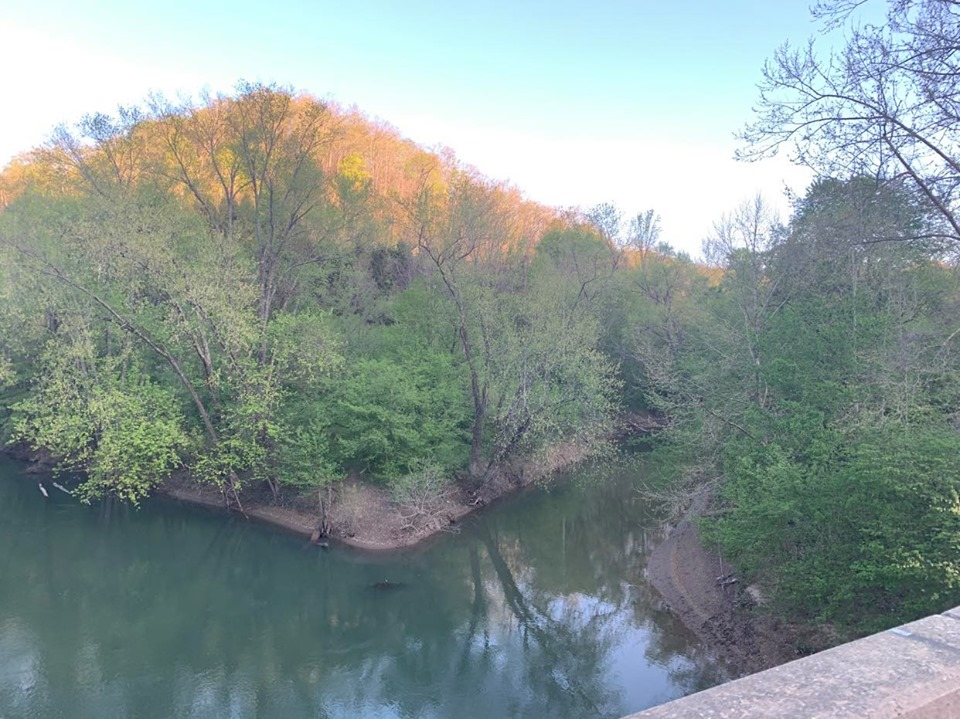
- Big Harts Creek empties into the Guyandotte River in Harts, West Virginia

Location
- Country: United States
- State: West Virginia
- County: Logan and Lincoln counties
- Towns: Harts, Warren, Spottswood, Whirlwind, Enzelo, Shively, and Halcyon

Physical characteristics
- Source: Main Harts Creek
  - location: Harts Creek Mountain, Chapmanville District, Logan County, West Virginia, United States
- 2nd source: Smokehouse Fork
  - location: Crawley Mountain, Chapmanville District, Logan County, West Virginia
- Source confluence
  - location: Warren, Chapmanville District, Logan County, West Virginia, United States
- Mouth: Guyandotte River
  - location: Harts, West Virginia, Harts Creek District, Lincoln County, WV
  - coordinates: 38°01′45″N 82°07′50″W

Basin features
- Tributaries
  - left: Hoover Fork, Buck Fork, Trace Fork, Rockhouse Fork, Thompson Branch, Big Branch (West Virginia)
  - right: Smokehouse Fork, Cole Branch, West/East Fork

Big Harts Creek, often shortened to "Harts Creek" or "Big Hart," is a major tributary of the Guyandotte River in Lincoln and Logan counties, West Virginia.

== Geography ==
Big Harts Creek originates in Logan County. Its largest tributaries are Smokehouse Fork, Buck Fork, Big Branch, and West Fork. Its entire headwaters are located in Logan County, while its lower regions lie in Lincoln County.

== History ==
Perhaps prior to 1800 and certainly shortly thereafter, Stephen Hart, an Indian fighter and ginseng hunter, first settled at Big Harts Creek. At that time, the creek was located in Kanawha County. Hart constructed a cabin at the Forks of Hart (the mouth of Smokehouse Fork) and a smokehouse further up the fork to cure his venison. As more settlers arrived, Hart relocated to Roane County. Harts Creek was named for Stephen Hart. One source claims that it was named due to the plentiful supply of deer (hart) in the vicinity. Richard Elkins was the first permanent settler of Harts Creek, arriving in 1807 or 1815. Elkins lived at the mouth of Harts Creek in the present-day town of Harts, West Virginia. As of 1809, the creek was located in Cabell County. After 1824, it was located in Logan County.

During the Civil War, over 90 percent of local men who enlisted to fight served in the Confederate military. In November 1861, Confederate General Albert Gallatin Jenkins and his Confederate forces passed by the creek on their way east with Union sympathizers captured in the town of Guyandotte. Shortly thereafter, while Confederates rested in Chapmanville, West Virginia, Union Major Kellian V. Whaley escaped and made his way to safety up Big Harts Creek to Queens Ridge. His escape was widely reported upon by newspapers.

Between 1867 and 1869, the lower section of Harts Creek became a part of Lincoln County. Harts Creek District, which includes Big Harts Creek, Big Ugly Creek, Little Harts Creek, Fourteen Mile Creek, Sand Creek, and Green Shoal, constitutes one of Lincoln County's largest districts.

From the earliest of times, timbering served as the creek's major industry. After the Civil War, large-scale timbering permeated the creek. The town of Hart, situated at the mouth of the creek, included several merchants.

During the 1880s, the Lincoln County Feud occurred on Harts Creek.

== See also ==
- List of rivers of West Virginia
