= Alcyone (1814 ship) =

History

United Kingdom
- Name: Alcyone
- Builder: France
- Launched: 1810
- Acquired: 1814 by purchase of a prize
- Fate: Last listed in 1824

General characteristics
- Tons burthen: 38569/94, or 386 (bm)

Alcyone (or Alcione), was launched in France in 1810 and under another name. She was taken in prize. Waters & Co. purchased her in 1814 and renamed her. She initially sailed to Asia and India under a licence from the British East India Company, and was the first vessel to formally to receive such a licence. She then sailed between London and the Cape of Good Hope. She was last listed in 1824.

== Career ==
Alcyone first appeared in Lloyd's Register in 1814.

| Year | Master | Owner | Trade | Source |
|---|---|---|---|---|
| 1814 | W.Johnson | Waters & Co. | Plymouth–London | LR |
| 1815 | W.Johnson; E.Waters | Waters | London–Java | LR |

In 1813 the EIC had lost its monopoly on the trade between India and Britain. British ships were then free to sail to India or the Indian Ocean under a licence from the EIC. Alcyone's owners applied for a licence on 25 June 1814 and received the licence on 27 June.

On 28 September 1815 Alcyone sailed to Batavia. On 17 October she was at Madeira, and two days after she sailed for Batavia.

On 17 February 1817 Alcyone sailed to Bombay.

| Year | Master | Owner | Trade | Source |
|---|---|---|---|---|
| 1818 | J.Thompson | Nourse & Co. | London–CGH | LR |
| 1824 | J.Thompson | Nourse & Co. | London–CGH | LR |

== Fate ==
Alcyone was last listed in 1824.
