= German trawler V 420 Alcyon =

History
- Name: Alcyon
- Owner: Unknown (1904–30); Bourgain-Vincent (1930–34); E. Malfoy & Fils (1934–40); Kriegsmarine (1940–43)
- Port of registry: Boulogne, France (1904–40); Kriegsmarine (1940–43)
- Builder: Bonn & Mees
- Yard number: 163
- Completed: 1904
- Identification: code letters OBNH (1904–33); Fishing boat registration B 2892 (1904–40); call sign FNOH (1934–40); Pennant number 10 (1940–41); Pennant number V 420 (1941–43)
- Fate: Sunk 2 August 1943

General characteristics
- Type: Fishing trawler (1904–40); Harbour defence boat (1940–41); Vorpostenboot (1941–43)
- Tonnage: 247 GRT, 100 NRT
- Length: 40.2 m (132.0 ft) (1925–35)
- Beam: 6.6 m (21.6 ft)
- Draught: 3.56 metres (11 ft 8 in)
- Depth: 3.8 m (12.6 ft)
- Installed power: Triple expansion steam engine, 60 nhp
- Propulsion: Single screw propeller
- Speed: 10 knots (19 km/h)

Alcyon was a French fishing trawler that was seized in World War II by the Kriegsmarine for use as a harbour defence boat and later a vorpostenboot, serving as Boot 10 Alcyon and V 420 Alcyon. She was bombed and sunk in the Gironde on 3 August 1943.

== Description ==
Alcyon was 40.2 m (132.0 ft) long, her beam was 6.6 m (21.6 ft), and her depth was 3.8 m (12.6 ft). Her draught was 3.56 metres (11 ft 8 in). Her tonnages were 266 GRT and 103 NRT. She had a single screw propeller. She had a three-cylinder triple expansion steam engine, made by Alblasserdamsche Machienfabriek, Alblasserdam, South Holland, Netherlands. It had cylinders of 33 centimetres (13 in), 55 centimetres (21 1/2 in) and 89 centimetres (35 in) diameter by 61 centimetres (24 in) stroke; was rated at 60 nhp; and gave her a speed of 10 knots (19 km/h).

== History ==
Bonn & Mees of Rotterdam, South Holland built Alcyon as yard number 163 by in 1904 for French owners. Her code letters were OBNH, and her port letter and number were B 2892. By 1930, she was owned by Bourgain-Vincent, Boulogne-sur-Mer. In 1934, the call sign FNOH superseded her code letters. She was sold to E. Malfoy & Fils in that year.

On 26 June 1940, Alcyon was seized by the Germans at La Rochelle, Charente-Inférieure. She was allocated to the Hafenschutz-Flotille Lorient on 2 November, serving as Boot 10 Alcyon. On 4 May 1942, Alcyon was redesignated as a vorpostenboot. She was allocated to 4 Vorpostenflotille as V 420 Alcyon. On 2 August 1943, she was sunk in the Gironde in an attack by British aircraft with the loss of five of her crew.

== Sources ==
- Gröner, Erich (1993). Die deutschen Kriegsschiffe 1815-1945 (in German). Vol. 8/I: Flußfahrzeuge, Ujäger, Vorpostenboote, Hilfsminensucher, Küstenschutzverbände (Teil 1). Koblenz: Bernard & Graefe. ISBN 3-7637-4807-5.
