= Halcyon (role-playing game) =

Halcyon Player Handbook
- Cover of the First Edition Player Codex
- Designers: Aaron M Cates
- Publishers: Neuwerld Studios
- Publication: 2008
- Genres: Science fiction, fantasy, cyberpunk
- Systems: Prodigy System

Halcyon is an indie role-playing game, independently published by Neuwerld Studios among two editions. The Player Codex was released in 2008 in softcover format, replaced in 2010 by the illustrated Core Rulebook in hardcover format.

== Synopsis ==
The setting of the game is rooted within the fictional metropolitan city of Halcyon, a futuristic city that was constructed on Manhattan island from the ashes of the former New York City. The storyline exhibits themes that have received prominent attention from contemporary mainstream newscasts including such issues as the polarization of wealth, disappearing middle-class, decline of the Earth's ecosystem, abuses by the executive branch of the United States Federal Government, manipulation and control of the mass through the use of fear tactics, erosion of the United States economy and employment market, and the perils associated with plutocracy and corporate imperiousness. Gameplay begins in the year 2120, eight years after the Great Tribulation, and includes the involvement of numerous governmental, militaristic, corporate, organizational, and independent factions as they converge upon the emerging city in struggles over power, money, and ideals.

== Genres ==
The Halcyon fictional universe comprises a fusion of several genres that are popular among role-playing games. According to the introduction to the core rules handbook, equal attention was given to developing the elements of science fiction, cyberpunk, fantasy, mythology, and dystopia.

== Related fiction ==
Money for Nothing was released in early fall 2009 at the Gen Con convention annually held in Indianapolis. The novel is based in the Halcyon game setting and uses a traditional action storyline from the perspective of mercenaries.
