= Mokhov (musician) =

American record producer

Oleg Mokhov, known by his stage name Mokhov, is a Russian-born American electronic music producer based in Las Vegas. He creates his music in a mobile manner, programming and recording sounds with music software on a laptop in various locations.

His productions are influenced by electronic musicians such as Four Tet, Boards of Canada, and Aphex Twin. His productions were initially offered on three 3-track releases on netlabels, which are all free downloads: Glass Soul EP, Purity EP, and Midnight Love EP. In July 2011, he released his first full-length, Halcyon Days, which collected the nine previously mentioned tracks and added a new track called "Eternal Wings". In October 2011, record label Made in Glitch released his first new material since his first full-length on the 4-track release Kickback EP. In May 2012, he released his second full-length in less than a year, Perfect Dream. In October 2012, Mad-Hop Records released his track "U Know" on the compilation album Mad-Hop Vol. 5. In April 2013, he released his third full-length, Magic Times, also in less than a year.

In June 2014, he released his fourth full-length, Future Hope. In November 2014, charitable organization Touched released his track "Dream Aroma" on the compilation album Touched Two for Macmillan Cancer Support. In December 2014, charitable organization Mo Chroí released his track "Eternal Soul" on the compilation album Mo Chroí for Irish Heart Foundation. In January 2015, he released his fifth full-length, Euphoric Magic. In April 2015, record label Sun Sea Sky Productions released his track "Hidden Love" on the compilation album Seasons: Volume One. In February 2016, he released his sixth full-length, Solace Embrace. In July 2016, Touched released his track "Future Flow" on the compilation album Touched 3 for Macmillan Cancer Support. In December 2017, he released his seventh full-length, Massive Love. In July 2018, Sun Sea Sky Productions released the album Of Tree, which contains 3 Mokhov tracks called "Sea Dream", "Sky Reflection", and "Sun Teardrop". In September 2018, he released his eighth full-length, Jupiter Melodies. In November 2019, he released his ninth full-length, Sun Bloom. In June 2020, he released his full-length Afterglow Reverie, and in May 2021, he released his full-length Drifting Off, with another full-length Solid State Dreams released that November.

Mokhov co-founded the podcast network BlueRize and on it has interviewed other electronic musicians about the topics of music production and business – "by a musician, for musicians". He has interviewed the following artists: Braiden, J Boogie, Asura, Christopher Willits, Loscil, Com Truise, Oliver Chesler aka The Horrorist, Dr. Strangeloop, Solvent, Austin Peralta, Ochre, and Tobias Tinker.

== Music placements ==
Mokhov's track "Fly Away" was used in a video for the 2014 Australian Open major tennis tournament, in a video commissioned by the City of Toronto documenting the installation of the art installation Forever Bicycles by Chinese contemporary artist Ai Weiwei and in a commercial by Braun for their CoolTec electric razor. His tracks "Soul Link" and "Love Shine" were used in videos by Boeing about metallic microlattice and solar cells respectively. His track "Sky High" was used in a video by Fox Sports featuring Michael Jordan speaking out against gun violence, in a video by Boeing about converted freighters and in a video by Gilt featuring American actress and model Kate Bosworth. His tracks "Eternal Wings" and "Tides of Clarity" were used in an episode of Culture Beat on the VICE Media and Intel channel The Creators Project. His track "Bliss Life" was used by Vail Ski Resort for their opening day 2015 video. His tracks "Purity" and "Glass Soul" were used in videos by Shiseido featuring American film actress Jennifer Connelly for their skin care product line Future Solution LX. His track "Magic Times" was used in the ice truck melt video by Canadian Tire and in the Poland episode of the Amazon Web Services series Now Go Build. His track "Halcyon Days" was used in a video by Harvard Business Review featuring the author Jeff Dyer and in a video by Boeing about digital flight decks. His track "Love Love Revolution" was used in the film The Thing About Harry.

Mokhov's music was featured in the soundtrack of the racing video game Gear.Club by the video game developer Eden Games.

== Soundtracks ==
Mokhov has created the scores for the 2008 documentary film Signed, the 2012 short film Academic Integrity and the 2023 short film Artjom. He has also created the soundtrack for the 2014 puzzle video game Digits by the software company Simple Machine.

== Remixes ==
Mokhov has, on YouTube, the most-played remix of the song "Endorphin" by Burial.

In November 2010, Morphosis Records released Aeron Aether feat. Catherine – Twilight (Notable Mentions), a remix release which features a Mokhov remix of the song "Twilight" by Aeron Aether featuring Catherine. In August 2011, Mokhov won a remix competition for the band Vanity Theft. The competition was hosted by the website Laptop Rockers. His remix will be officially released along with the other winning remixes by Vanity Theft's record label Vigilante Music. In September 2011, Neferiu Records released graciellita – Past the Hour EP: Mokhov Remix, which contains 5 Mokhov remixes of songs from Montreal, Quebec-based singer graciellita's Past the Hour EP. In November 2011, Los Angeles-based group NazcarNation released their single "Hot Girls" on Totes Dece, which features a Mokhov remix of the song "Hot Girls Have It So Easy".

In July 2012, website MTV Hive featured a Mokhov remix of the song "White" by Frank Ocean. In October 2012, Vigilante Music released Vanity Theft – Remixes Vol. 2 – Forget What You Came For, which contains a Mokhov remix of the song "Rattle Rattle". In July 2013, Neferiu Records released Mantrakid – Dragon Refrain, which contains a Mokhov remix of the song "The Shaman". In September 2013, Sun Sea Sky Productions released Melorman – Waves Remixes, which contains a Mokhov remix of the song "Lights", and in October of that same year they released Melorman – Mokhov Remixes, which contains 8 Mokhov remixes of songs by Melorman. In January 2015, Export Label released Printempo – Fluctuation Remixes, which contains a Mokhov remix of the song "PT03". In June 2015, Touched released the compilation album Touched Two (The Remixes) for Macmillan Cancer Support, which contains a Mokhov remix of the song "Sea Bound" by 2020k & Wet Eyes. In October 2016, Gustaf Fjelstrom released Diametric, which contains a Mokhov remix of the song "Imprint". In November 2016, Sun Sea Sky Productions released SineRider – Hours Days (Mokhov Remixes), which contains 8 Mokhov remixes of songs from SineRider's full-length Seconds Minutes.

In March 2018, Cиtropy released a self-titled EP on Sun Sea Sky Productions, which contains a Mokhov remix of the song "Star". In May 2018, Sun Sea Sky Productions released Ruxpin – Mokhov Remixes, which contains 5 Mokhov remixes of songs by Ruxpin. In August 2018, Sun Sea Sky Productions released Melorman – Somewhere, Someday & Away (Remixes), which contains a Mokhov remix of the song "Breath". In August 2020, Sun Sea Sky Productions released Isophene – Echo Point, which contains a Mokhov remix of the song "Echo Point".

== Discography ==
=== Albums ===
- Halcyon Days (Magnatune/Mokhov Music, July 2011)
- Perfect Dream (Magnatune/Mokhov Music, May 2012)
- Magic Times (Magnatune/Mokhov Music, April 2013)
- Future Hope (Sun Sea Sky Productions/Magnatune/Mokhov Music, June 2014)
- Euphoric Magic (Mokhov Music, January 2015)
- Solace Embrace (Mokhov Music, February 2016)
- Massive Love (Mokhov Music, December 2017)
- Jupiter Melodies (Mokhov Music, September 2018)
- Sun Bloom (Mokhov Music, November 2019)
- Afterglow Reverie (Mokhov Music, June 2020)
- Drifting Off (Mokhov Music, May 2021)
- Solid State Dreams (Mokhov Music, November 2021)
- For Monkey (Mokhov Music, March 2023)
- First Day in a New Place (Mokhov Music, June 2024)
- Eternal Journey (Mokhov Music, January 2025)
- Paradise Shimmer (Mokhov Music, July 2025)
- Life Breeze (Mokhov Music, January 2026)

=== EPs ===
- Glass Soul EP (Otium, March 2011)
- Purity EP (Catnap, March 2011)
- Midnight Love EP (Dusted Wax Kingdom, April 2011)
- Kickback EP (Made in Glitch, October 2011)
- Halcyon EP (Neferiu, December 2011)

=== Compilations ===
- Memories 2010–2013 One (Mokhov Music, April 2022)
- Memories 2010–2013 Two (Mokhov Music, September 2022)
- Digits Expanded (Mokhov Music, May 2023)

=== Compilation appearances ===
- "U Know" on Mad-Hop Vol. 5 (Mad-Hop Records, October 2012)
- "Dream Aroma" on Touched Two for Macmillan Cancer Support (Touched, November 2014)
- "Eternal Soul" on Mo Chroí for Irish Heart Foundation (Mo Chroí, December 2014)
- "Hidden Love" on Seasons: Volume One (Sun Sea Sky Productions, April 2015)
- "Future Flow" on Touched 3 for Macmillan Cancer Support (Touched, July 2016)
- "Sea Dream" on Of Tree (Sun Sea Sky Productions, July 2018)
- "Sky Reflection" on Of Tree (Sun Sea Sky Productions, July 2018)
- "Sun Teardrop" on Of Tree (Sun Sea Sky Productions, July 2018)

=== Remixes ===
- Aeron Aether feat. Catherine – "Twilight (Mokhov Remix)" (Morphosis Records, November 2010)
- graciellita – Past the Hour EP: Mokhov Remix (Neferiu, September 2011)
- NazcarNation – "Hot Girls Have It So Easy (Mokhov Remix)" (Totes Dece, November 2011)
- Vanity Theft – "Rattle Rattle (Mokhov Remix)" (Vigilante Music, October 2012)
- Mantrakid – "The Shaman (Mokhov Remix)" (Neferiu, July 2013)
- Melorman – "Lights (Mokhov Remix)" (Sun Sea Sky Productions, September 2013)
- Melorman – Mokhov Remixes (Sun Sea Sky Productions, October 2013)
- Printempo – "PT03 (Mokhov Remix)" (Export Label, January 2015)
- 2020k & Wet Eyes – "Sea Bound (Mokhov Remix)" (Touched, June 2015)
- Gustaf Fjelstrom – "Imprint (Mokhov San Frandisco Remix)" (Botched, October 2016)
- SineRider – Hours Days (Mokhov Remixes) (Sun Sea Sky Productions, November 2016)
- Cиtropy – "Star (Mokhov Remix)" (Sun Sea Sky Productions, March 2018)
- Ruxpin – Mokhov Remixes (Sun Sea Sky Productions, May 2018)
- Melorman – "Breath (Mokhov Remix)" (Sun Sea Sky Productions, August 2018)
- Isophene – "Echo Point (Mokhov Remix)" (Sun Sea Sky Productions, August 2020)
- (ghost) – "Bloom (Mokhov Remix)" (Sun Sea Sky Productions, February 2023)
- Snufmumriko – "Gamla kuststigar (Mokhov Remix)" (Sun Sea Sky Productions, November 2023)
- Jared MK – Remixes (Featuring Mokhov) (Massive Action Records, June 2024)
