= NazcarNation =

NazcarNation was a music project founded by Chris Wargo and Craig Robert Smith at Los Angeles in 2008. NazcarNation began working on song ideas and concepts in Wargo's studio apartment, creating a musical blend of hip hop and dubstep from Wargo's influence mixed with the melodic ambient leanings of Smith. Later the group tracked the louder bits with drummer/multi-instrumentalist Mark Balane, completing the framework for their live set. Known in the chillwave movement and with the completion of their debut EP titled "Dynazty" in 2010 (Mastered by Nic Pope at Different Fur Studios, San Francisco) NazcarNation crowd-tested their sample heavy grooves to packed venues in Los Angeles such as The Standard in Hollywood, The Viper Room, and SPACE15TWENTY. NazcarNation later became Gangplans.

== Discography ==
- Dynazty EP - 2010
- Dynazty Dynazty: The Remixes - 2010
