= John Styn =

John Halcyon Styn
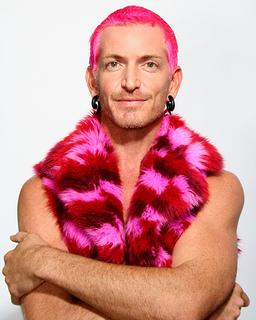
- Styn in 2011
- Born: May 28, 1971 (age 55); San Diego, California, U.S.
- Other names: Halcyon Lujah, Halcyon Pink

John Halcyon Styn (born May 28, 1971) is an American blogger, entrepreneur, motivational speaker, web designer, author, and web celebrity, who "pushed the boundaries of online self-expression" through his various online projects. He is currently the co-founder of 1st Saturdays, a homeless outreach project, and the host of Hug Nation.

== Career ==
Styn worked as the first webmaster for Sony's Station e-commerce mall and for CollegeClub.com.

Styn has won two Webby Awards, the first, as the designer and star of his personal website, cockybastard.com, and the second for a Hug Nation video podcast.

Other projects have included:

- Fears. Regrets. Desires, an NBC Internet-only, confessional story-sharing show. Host.
- FreshRealm, a food shipping company that uses reusable shipping technology. Chief Wisdom Officer.
- Anybeat, a social networking service based on pseudonymity.
- Hug Nation, which won the "people's choice" Webby Award in 2007.
- Pink Aid, a charity originally started to raise money for victims of Hurricane Katrina.
- "I-Bridge International", an Internet services company.
- CitizenX.com, an experimental webcam community.
- TheRealHouse, a live webcam-house that ran from 2000 to 2002
- The book, Love more. Fear less. (2010)
- The book, Protagonist: 50 Years of Life as Art (2021)
- 1st Saturdays, a homeless outreach project based in San Diego started in 2009.
- Hug Nation Zoom Gratitude Circles daily since COVID-19 lockdowns. Host.

== Blogging career ==
Styn bought his first URL in 1996 to put his self-published zine, Prehensile Tales, on the web. This first autobiographical ezine ran from 1996 to 2000.

He first achieved Internet notoriety when one of his stories got him into trouble with Fruit of the Loom, when they sent a cease and desist order on March 2, 1998, demanding that he take down a parody of their logo that he made for a blog post.

He was also a contributor for the Burning Blog, the official blog of Burning Man.

== Awards and nominations ==
Year	Association	Category	Result
2000	Webby Award	Best Personal Website — cockybastard.com	Won
2007	Webby Award	Reality — Hug Nation	Won
