= Italian ship Alcione =

Alcione was the name of at least three ships of the Italian Navy and may refer to:

- Italian torpedo boat Alcione (1906), a Pegaso-class torpedo boat launched in 1906 and discarded in 1923.
- Italian torpedo boat Alcione (1937), a Spica-class torpedo boat launched in 1937 and sunk in 1941.
- Italian corvette Alcione (F 544), an Albatros-class corvette launched in 1954 and stricken in 1991.
