= Halcyon, Missouri =

Extinct hamlet in Missouri, U.S.

Coordinates: 37°28′35″N 91°22′58″W

Halcyon is an extinct town in Dent County, in the U.S. state of Missouri.

A post office called Halcyon was established in 1903, and remained in operation until 1905. The community took its name from Halcyon, a character in Greek mythology.
