= Sun Management Center =

Computer system monitoring software

Sun Management Center (Sun MC) is a systems management and monitoring tool developed by Sun Microsystems for enterprise-wide management of Sun servers, desktops and storage devices.

It is designed to enhance system performance, reliability, security, and utilization by allowing system administrators to monitor all servers and components in their data center, including boards, CPUs, fans, and power supplies.

The tool comprises three layers. The console, a user interface, interacts with the server to get the configuration information, data, and image files necessary to present views of the managed servers. The server acts as a request broker between the managed systems and the console, handling tasks like topology management, event management, configuration management, and trap handling. An agent normally runs on each system being managed. Each agent has modules capable of managing specific data items, such as hardware, operating system, and application data.

Sun MC provides in-depth monitoring of Sun hardware and a comprehensive set of metrics for the Solaris Operating System, including support for Solaris Containers. It is open and extensible, and supports various add-ons for additional system management capabilities.

Sun MC was originally named Sun Enterprise SyMON, and was co-developed by Halcyon Monitoring Solutions. Clients are available for Solaris on SPARC and x86 systems as well as Linux on x86 systems.

== Protocols used ==
- SNMP v2usec (optional encryption libraries), v1 and v3 (compatible)
- HTTP with SSL
- RMI
- TCP/IP for Probe Connections (adhoc commands)

== See also ==
- IBM Director
- List of systems management systems
- Oracle Enterprise Manager
- System Center Operations Manager
