= Halcyon RB80 =

Non-depth-compensated passive addition semi-closed circuit rebreather

- Uses: Diving rebreather for cave exploration
- Inventor: Reinhard Buchaly
- Manufacturer: Halcyon
- Model: RB80

The Halcyon RB80 is a non-depth-compensated passive addition semi-closed circuit rebreather of similar external dimensions to a standard AL80 scuba cylinder (11-litre, 207-bar aluminium cylinder, 185 mm diameter and about 660 mm long). It was originally developed by Reinhard Buchaly (RB) in 1996 for the cave exploration dives conducted by the European Karst Plain Project (EKPP).

About 1/10 of the respired volume of breathing gas in the circuit is discharged during each breathing cycle by a concentric bellows counterlung system, which reduces the loop volume and is replenished by internal valves, triggered by low loop volume, similar to the function of the demand valve of a scuba regulator.

The Halcyon RB80 was introduced as a replacement for the much bulkier and more mechanically complex PVR-BASC, which was depth-compensated and used a ballasted bellows counterlung.

== History ==
The RB80 passive addition semi-closed rebreather was originally developed by Reinhard Buchaly (RB) in 1996 for the cave exploration dives conducted by the European Karst Plain Project (EKPP), and is approximately the size of the common 80 cubic foot aluminium scuba cylinder. The Halcyon version of the RB80 was introduced as a replacement for the much bulkier and more mechanically complex Halcyon PVR-BASC, which was depth-compensated and used a ballasted bellows counterlung.

The RB80 has been in use since the 1990s by the Woodville Karst Plain Project for mapping the underwater caves of the Woodville Karst Plain. By 2021, more than 185,000 feet (56,000 m) of cave passage, of which over 115,000 feet (35,000 m) are deeper than 190 feet (58 m). Since 2008, the RB80 has been used by El Centro Investigador del Sistema Acuífero de Quintana Roo (CINDAQ)'s Mexican Cave Exploration Project (MCEP) project for exploration in the caves of the Yucatán. Between January 2018 and December 2020, MCEP divers mapped more than 180,000 metres (590,000 ft) of new cave passage in Sistema Ox Bel Ha using RB80s. The RB80 has also been used for cave exploration projects in China, Australia, the south of France, Spain, Italy, and other karst areas around the world, and has also been used for ghost net removal and for wreck diving.

A modified sidemount version of the RB80, called the RBK has been produced in three versions. It has a smaller scrubber capacity and is shorter, at 50cm, with the same diameter as the RB80. The RBK has been used as a sidemount, travel, and bailout rebreather and has advantages in long-range explorations through small passages.

== Specifications ==
- The RB80 axial flow scrubber carries a 7.05 pounds (3.20 kg) absorbent charge which based on more than twenty years of operational experience will last approximately ten hours.
- The RBK carries 5.6 pounds (2.5 kg) absorbent which provides approximately eight hours of scrubber endurance.
- The 8–10:1 counterlung volume ratio of the RB80 provides substantial gas extension, with a loop oxygen fraction lower than the feed gas composition. The decrease in oxygen fraction depends on the supply gas oxygen concentration and the operating depth. The difference is less at greater depth, but can be quite large at shallow depths.
- The RBK has a 6–8:1 gas extension.
- The inner bellows automatically vents water from the loop
- Semi-closed operation eliminates the risk of unit-induced oxygen toxicity (max PPO_{2} is that of the supply gas connected)
- Full access to on-board gas supply in either semi-closed circuit or open circuit bailout
- Cylinder volume to user's choice. Large cylinders can be carried.

The RB80 has no electronics or gas monitoring instrumentation beyond a submersible pressure gauge for the supply gas cylinder, and can be left underwater as a stage set with the valves closed and then be turned on and used immediately.

== Breathing cycle ==
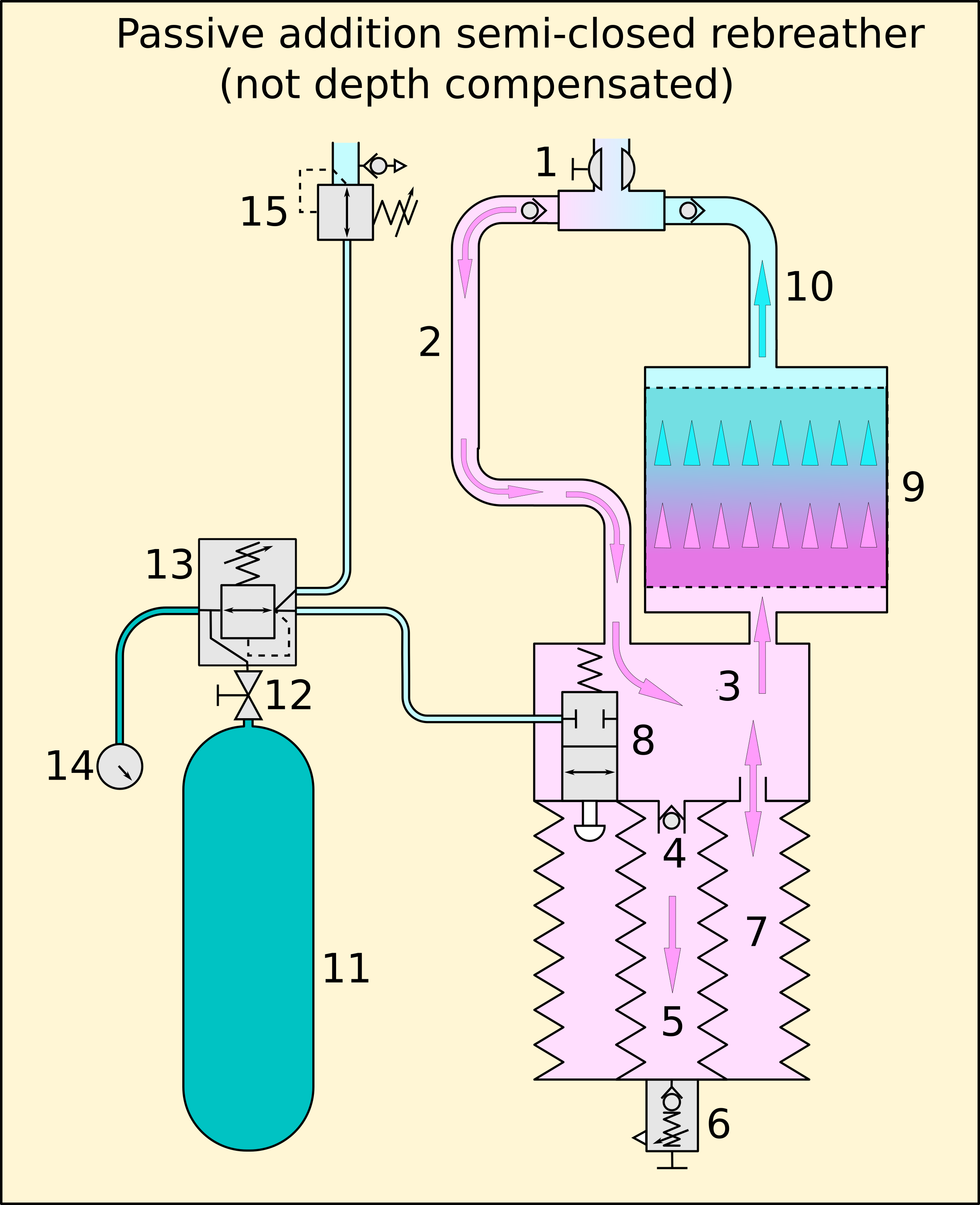
Schematic diagram of the breathing gas circuit of a passive addition semi-closed circuit rebreather.: 1 Dive/surface valve with loop non-return valves; 2 Exhalation hose; 3 Counterlung fore-chamber; 4 Non-return valve to discharge bellows; 5 Discharge bellows; 6 Overpressure valve; 7 Main counterlung bellows; 8 Addition valve; 9 Scrubber (axial flow); 10 Inhalation hose; 11 Breathing gas storage cylinder; 12 Cylinder valve; 13 Regulator first stage; 14 Submersible pressure gauge; 15 Bailout demand valve

Inhalation closes the mouthpiece exhalation non-return valve and draws gas through the inhalation non-return valve. The pressure drop draws the contents of the outer bellows through the scrubber, inhalation hose, non-return valve and mouthpiece to the diver. As the concentric bellows contract, the pressure in the inner bellows increases and first closes the internal non-return valve, then pushes its contents through the outer non-return valve, discharging to the surroundings. When the bellows is fully contracted, the bottom cover triggers the gas addition valves which inject gas until the diver stops inhaling and the bottom cover no longer presses against the addition valve actuator. If the gas in the breathing circuit has been compressed by an increase in depth, the gas volume will be even less and the addition valves will be triggered for longer, bringing the volume back to the appropriate level. The RB80 uses two addition valves in parallel, so that if one fails, the other will provide the required gas.

Exhalation closes the mouthpiece non-return valve in the inhalation hose and pushes gas through the exhalation hose to the bellows counterlungs which will expand to accommodate the exhaled volume. If there is an excess beyond the capacity of the fully expanded bellows, as will occur if the gas expands due to a decrease in ambient pressure during ascent, the excess gas will simply pass out through the inner counterlung's non-return valves to the surroundings. The design of internal ducting leads water in the exhalation side of the loop into the inner counterlung bellows, and from there it is discharged to the surroundings along with the gas during the inhalation stage of the cycle.

== Safety ==
If the breathing gas supply is depleted, the dose of fresh breathing gas decreases until the breathing supply is used up. The diver will notice the decreasing volume of gas available which signals the need to switch to an independent open-circuit bailout system, which is integrated into the rebreather mouthpiece as a bailout valve, or to connect another supply cylinder to the rebreather. Water which leaks into, or accumulates in the breathing loop drains into the inner bellows from which it is automatically discharged into the environment along with the discharged air when the inner bellows is emptied during each inhalation.

== Configuration ==
The RB80 is usually carried between a set of back mounted isolation manifolded double cylinders, supported on a backplate and wing harness. Dives in shallow open water could be done using a small single tank mounted to one side of the RB80. It can also be side-mounted for tight restrictions. Occasionally extreme dive profiles require the use of a rebreather for bailout, and the RB80 can be carried as a back mounted pair, as one back mount and one side mount, or both side mounted for those occasions. The RGK is intended for sidemount.

The appropriate tank size depends on the dive activity and environment. In most cases the volume of gas should be sufficient that at any time during the dive the gas remaining in the cylinders is sufficient to reach the surface on open circuit, after completing all required decompression.

Gas selection is basically to use the gas that would be appropriate for an open circuit dive of the same profile. The RB80 has a dual-inlet gas manifold that allows divers to change gas mixtures during the dive to suit the depth or for decompression.

=== Loop gas calculation ===
Oxygen partial pressure in a passive addition system is controlled by the breathing rate of the diver. Feed gas is added by a valve which is equivalent to an open circuit demand valve in function, which opens to supply gas when the counterlung is empty - the moving top plate of the counterlung works like the diaphragm of a demand valve to operate the lever opening the valve when the counterlung volume is low. The volume may be low because the internal bellows has discharged a part of the previous breath to the environment, or because an increase in depth has caused the contents to be compressed, or a combination of these causes. The oxygen used by the diver also slowly decreases the volume of gas in the loop.

The steady state partial pressure, $F_{O_2loop}$, in a passive addition loop can be calculated from the formula:

$$F_{O_2loop}=\frac{(P_{amb}*K_{bellows}*K_E+1)F_{O_2feed}-1}{P_{amb}*K_{bellows}*K_E}$$

Where:

$P_{amb}$ = Ambient pressure,
$K_{bellows}$ = Bellows ratio - the ratio between the volume of expired air in the counterlungs and the amount dumped,
$K_E$ = Extraction ratio (ratio of minute ventilation and oxygen uptake), which usually falls in the range of 17 to 25 with a normal value of about 20 for healthy humans. Values as low as 10 and as high as 30 have been measured. Variations may be caused by the diet of the diver, the dead space of the diver and equipment, raised levels of carbon dioxide, or raised work of breathing and tolerance to carbon dioxide.
$F_{O_2feed}$ = Oxygen fraction of the supply gas,

in a consistent system of units.

Oxygen consumption and feed rate are strongly related, and the steady state oxygen concentration in the loop is independent of oxygen uptake and is likely to remain within fairly close tolerances of the calculated value for a given depth.

The oxygen fraction of the gas in the circuit will approximate the feed gas more closely for greater depth.

The deficit between inhaled FO_{2} and feed gas FO_{2} is a function of the bellows ratio and depth. It is large near the surface and decreases with increase in depth. The inhaled FO_{2} remains fairly steady at any depth for a considerable range of workload, although supply gas will be used more quickly at higher workloads. The deficit will vary at constant depth with the ratio of respiratory minute ventilation to rate of oxygen consumption, as will occur in hyper- or hypoventilation.

This deficit can reduce the partial pressure of oxygen in the loop to levels that will not support life, particularly at shallow depths, and there is a risk that the diver may ascend to a depth where the mix will be hypoxic. The variation in oxygen deficit means that the range of depth at which the rebreather is safe to dive is significantly less than for the same supply gas on open circuit.
