= Janus Motorcycles =

American motorcycle manufacturer

Coordinates: 41.5845°N 85.8334°W

- Type: Private
- Industry: Motor vehicle design and manufacturing
- Founded: 2011
- Founder: Devin Biek and Richard Worsham
- Headquarters: Goshen, Indiana, USA
- Area served: USA
- Products: Motorcycles, motorcycle parts
- Number of employees: 16
- Website: janusmotorcycles.com

Janus Motorcycles is an American manufacturer of small-displacement motorcycles in Goshen, Indiana. The company was founded in 2011 by Richard Worsham and Devin Biek, and has been delivering motorcycles since 2013. Worsham and Biek got started repairing, restoring, and tuning vintage, pedal-type mopeds through Biek's company, Motion Left Mopeds, a manufacturer of aftermarket performance parts for vintage two-strokes. The moped business led to their interest in small, lightweight bikes, and helped develop business relationships with local component vendors.

== Models ==
=== Halcyon 50 ===
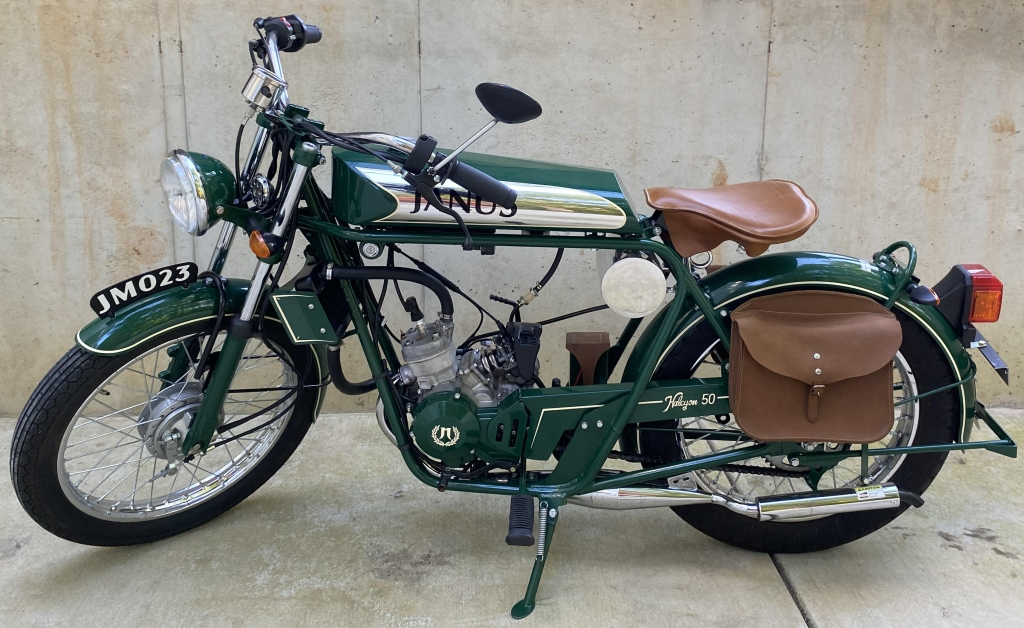
Halcyon50

The company's first model, the Halcyon 50, was a hard-tail motorcycle with a long, low tank, sprung seat, and wide handlebars, and 6-speed gearbox. Optional leather saddlebags and other upgrades were sold with the bike. It had a TIG-welded, rigid, double-cradle tubular steel frame, based on the Norton Featherbed. The engine was a water-cooled 50cc two-stroke based on the Derbi Senda engine, which Janus said had 10 hp (7.5 kW), allowing a claimed top speed of 55 mph (89 km/h). It had front and rear drum brakes. Apart from the engine, forks, and hubs, everything on the bike was manufactured locally.

Total production of Halcyon 50 motorcycles was forty-three units.

=== Halcyon 250 and Phoenix 250 ===
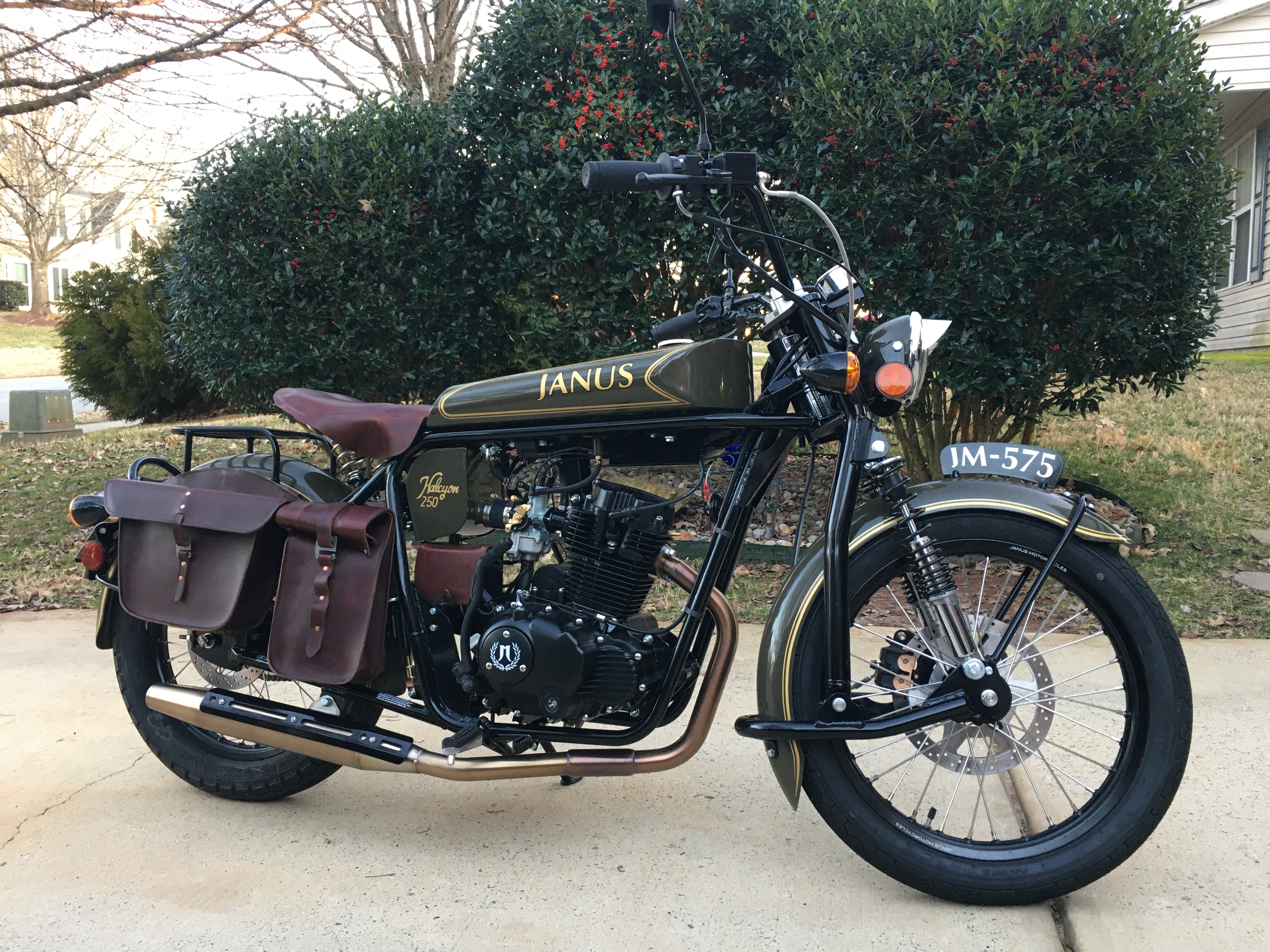
2021 Model Year Janus Halcyon 250

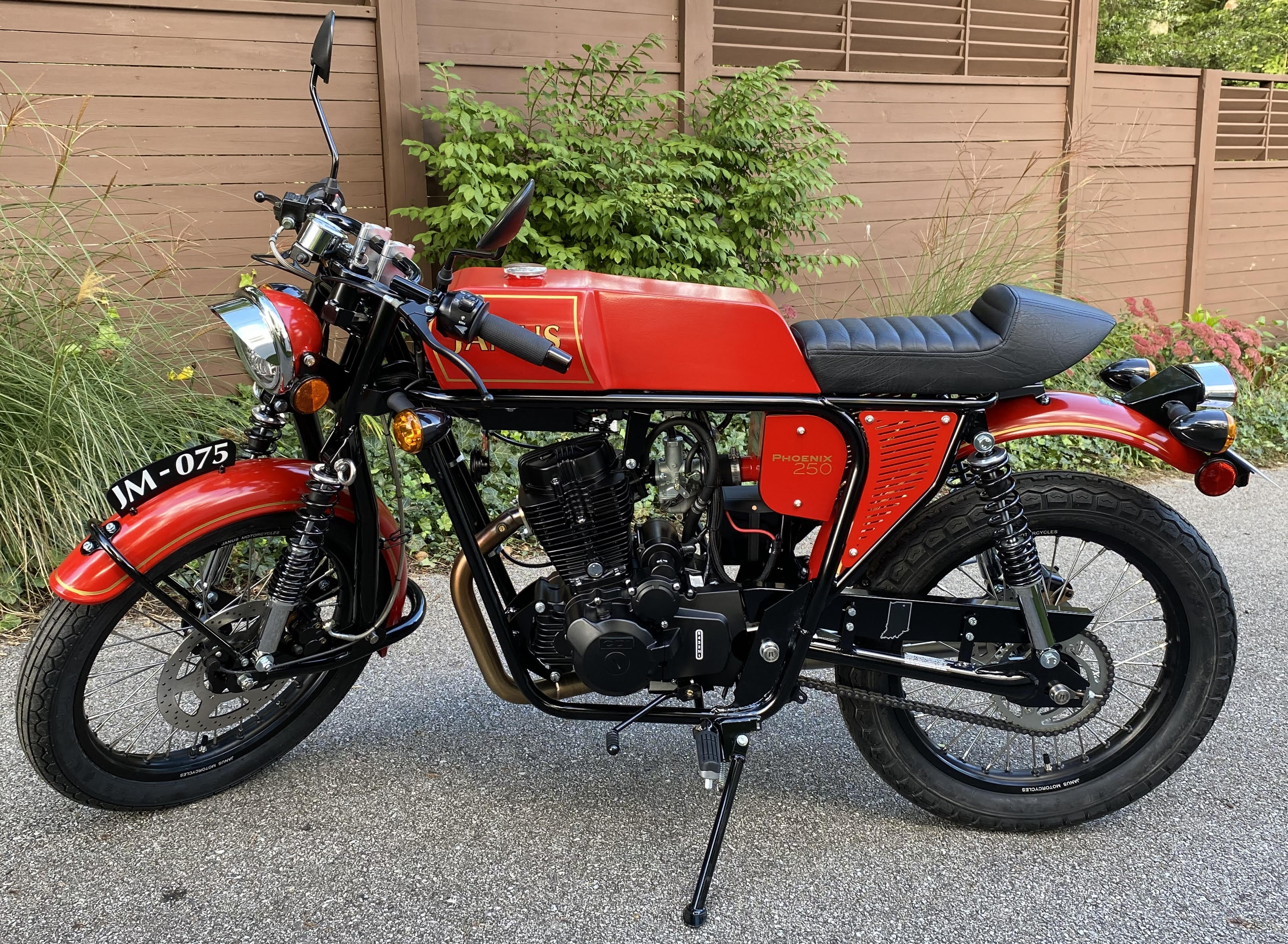
2022 model year Janus Phoenix 250

In 2015, Janus introduced two new models built around a new 250cc four-stroke power plant. The Halcyon 250 was an update on the original Halcyon 50 with a completely redesigned frame, wheels, hydraulic disc brakes, but a similar aesthetic looking back to early motorcycles from the 1920s and 1930s. The second model, called the Phoenix 250, was a sportier model featuring grand-prix inspired lines and full suspension, a long "Dunstall" style fuel tank with knee slots and a café racer seat. In April 2017, Janus introduced the Gryffin 250, a scrambler-inspired motorcycle with off-road capability. All three models share the same "featherbed" style double-cradle frame, and proprietary leading-link front suspension.

The difficulty of meeting pollution limits with two-stroke engines led to replacing the 50cc Derbi engines with a 250cc four-stroke single-cylinder engine imported from China. Janus said the two models reach a top speed of 70 mph (110 km/h) with the 14 hp (10 kW) at 7,000 rpm and 11.6 ft⋅lb (15.7 J) @ 5,500 rpm engine. The company says the bikes' curb weights are about 260 lb (120 kg) for the Halcyon and 265 lb (120 kg) for the Phoenix . Janus claims an EPA-calculated fuel economy of 77 miles per gallon.

In January 2018, Janus announced that it had received 49-state EPA emissions certification for all models, followed by the announcement of California ARB certification in May of the same year.

On August 19, 2022, in a YouTube video Janus announced the discontinuation of the Phoenix 250 model. Total production of the Phoenix 250 reached seventy-nine units.

As of September 2022 total Halcyon 250 production was greater than nine hundred units.

=== Gryffin 250 ===
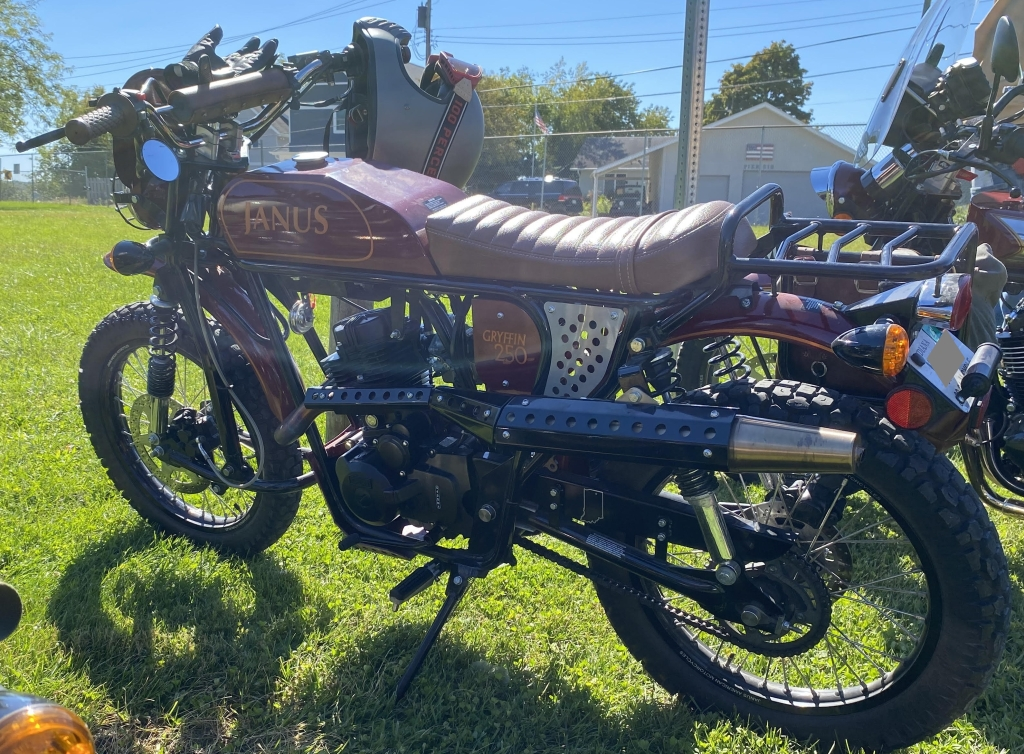
Janus Gryffin 250

In 2018 Janus released the Gryffin. Using the same engine as the Halcyon and Phoenix 250 models the Gryffin was designed to handle the occasional dirt or gravel road.

As of September 2022 total Gryffin 250 production was one hundred twenty-three units and climbing.

=== Halcyon 450 ===
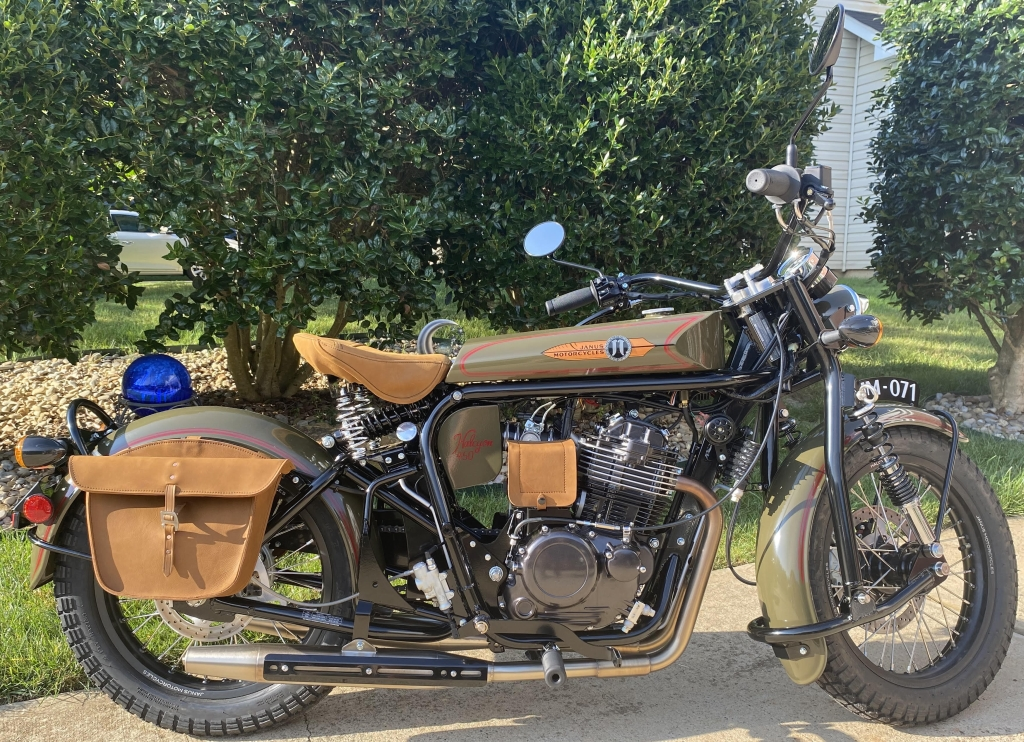
Janus Motorcycles 2021 Halcyon 450 Motorcycle

In March 2021, Janus unveiled a new Halcyon model, the Halcyon 450. Current owners of Janus motorcycles were given an early preview and opportunity to purchase one of the first ten units produced through an auction format. These units are referred to as 'First Edition' models and include the following special features: hand stamped serial number, engraved fuel cap with serial number, signed and numbered chain guard, and a signed and numbered first edition print. Additionally the 'First Edition' models include Janus' deluxe tank upgrade, double pinstripe, second mirror, saddlebags, polished exhaust, and wheel pinstripes at no additional charge. The public release of the Halcyon 450 occurred on March 8, 2021. Stylistically the model continues in the design footsteps of the Halcyon 50 and Halcyon 250. The power-plant for the Halcyon 450 is a SWM designed 445cc single cylinder engine. The engine is produced in China under the guidance of SWM employees. The engine features electronic fuel injection, four valves operated by an overhead cam, and dual exhaust. Janus states the Halcyon 450 is capable of speeds of ninety miles per hour. MSRP of standard Halcyon 450 motorcycles is $13,500. The minimum bid for 'First Edition' motorcycles was set at $17,500.
