= Lincoln County feud =

- Part of Appalachian feuds
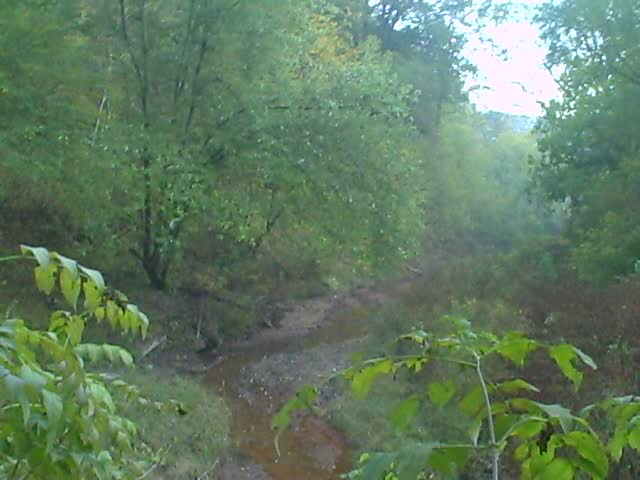
- The mouth of Big Harts Creek, Lincoln County, WV
- Date: 1878–1890
- Location: Harts Creek community in the Guyandotte River Valley, Lincoln and Logan counties, West Virginia
- Caused by: personal grievances, land issues, timber disputes, business competition, liquor trade

Parties
Brumfield and Dingess families	Adkins, Adams, Hall, Runyon, Nester families

Lead figures
Paris Brumfield, Henderson Dingess, Al Brumfield	Canaan "Cain" Adkins, Benjamin Adams, John W. Runyon

Casualties and losses
1 killed	3 killed

The Lincoln County feud occurred in the Harts Creek community of Lincoln and Logan counties, West Virginia, between 1878 and 1890.

== Background ==
The feud arose out of personal grievances between Paris Brumfield (c.1837–1891), a distiller, storekeeper, and timber man, and Canaan "Cain" Adkins (1833–1896), a United Baptist preacher, country physician, schoolteacher, and justice of the peace. A great deal of the early trouble centered on ownership of a key piece of real estate at the mouth of Harts Creek. Aside from the Brumfield-Adkins quarrel, the feud included family quarrels between Henderson Dingess (1829–1902), a distiller, and his brother-in-law, Benjamin Adams (1852–1910), a timber boss, and the Halls, one of whom had married Dingess' son, Floyd.

== The feud ==
By the mid-1880s, the Brumfield-Adkins vendetta, the Dingess-Adams vendetta, and the Dingess-Hall vendetta had become hopelessly entangled, partly due to the marriage of Allen "Al" Brumfield (1860–1905), merchant son of Paris, and Hollena Dingess (1863–1937), daughter of Henderson. While Paris Brumfield continued his personal feud with Cain Adkins and his family, Al Brumfield feuded with Ben Adams, his uncle-in-law, John W. Runyon (1855–1925), storekeeper, tavern operator, and deputy sheriff, and others due to matters of business, politics, or land. The Lincoln County Feud ranks as the second-most famous feud in West Virginia history, trumped only by the Hatfield-McCoy Feud, which occurred in the nearby Tug Valley. During its hey-day, the Lincoln feud commanded headlines in newspapers throughout the United States. It resulted in four confirmed deaths and the extermination or out-migration of some of the community's leading citizens, established Harts Creek as one of West Virginia's most violent communities, and may have triggered the movement of a county boundary.

Allen "Al" Brumfield, 1890s. Courtesy of Brandon R. Kirk

== Deaths ==
- September 1882: Paris Brumfield mortally wounds Mont "Boney" Lucas in a fight at the lower section of Harts Creek.
- November 15, 1888: William "Little Bill" Hall kills Floyd Dingess at the mouth of Rockhouse Fork of Harts Creek.
- October 24, 1889: A mob brutally murders Thomas Milton "Milt" Haley and William Greenville "Green" McCoy at the mouth of Green Shoal Creek.

== Popular culture ==
In 1925, Professor John Harrington Cox published Folk-Songs of the South, which included a ballad titled "A West Virginia Feud Song" that detailed key events in the Lincoln County Feud. The following year, regional historian and educator Fred B. Lambert presented a brief account of the feud, including a better version of Cox's ballad titled "The Lincoln County Crew," which he attributed to George W. Ferrell. In 1986 and 1992, Goldenseal magazine, West Virginia's premiere publication of state culture and history, resurrected the story and published two accounts of the feud. During the early 1990s, Brandon Ray Kirk, a local historian and descendant of feudists, began to research the feud story, mostly compiling oral histories and consulting available newspaper accounts. Between 1995 and 2001, Kirk partnered with country music star John Hartford to research the feud. During that time, Hartford and Kirk primarily investigated the life of Ed Haley, one of the most significant musicians of his era, whose father had been murdered in the Lincoln County Feud. In 1997, Rounder Records released a four CD set of Haley's home recordings from the late 1940s, titled Forked Deer and Grey Eagle, which featured liner notes by Hartford and Kirk regarding the feud. In 1998, Hartford released the Haley-inspired and Grammy-nominated CD The Speed of the Old Long Bow, which included some feud-era musical selections. In the late 1990s, Kirk and Hartford published a brief history of the feud in the West Virginia Encyclopedia. Hartford and Kirk also collaborated with Douglas W. Owsley, Division Head of Physical Anthropology at the Smithsonian's National Museum of Natural History (NMNH), to exhume the grave of two feudists. In March 2000, Smithsonian magazine published a story regarding the dig. Ed Haley's music appeared in the movie O Brother Where Art Thou? which won a Grammy in 2001. In 2014, Kirk published Blood in West Virginia: Brumfield v. McCoy (Pelican Publishing Company: Gretna, LA), which details the story of the Lincoln County Feud.
