= Alcyone (1810 ship) =

History

United Kingdom
- Builder: Thomas Steemson, Paull, Hull,
- Launched: 18 August 1810
- Fate: Last listed 1847.

General characteristics
- Tons burthen: 383, or 391, or 392 (bm)
- Length: 108 ft 5 in (33.0 m)
- Beam: 29 ft 1 in (8.9 m)
- Armament: 4 × 9-pounder guns + 8 × 18-pounder carronades

Alcyone (or Alcione) was launched in 1810 at Kingston-on-Hull. She spent her career as a merchantman sailing across the Atlantic. She suffered a major grounding in 1824. Circa 1827 Alcyone sailed to India under a licence from the British East India Company (EIC). After her one voyage to India, Alcyone traded to the Baltic and to North and Central America. In 1844–1845 she participated in the guano rush at Ichaboe Island. She was last listed in 1847.

== Career ==
Alcyone was first listed in Lloyd's Register (LR) in 1810.

Year	Master	Owner	Trade	Source
1810	Vollans	Read & Co.	Hull–Rio de Janeiro	LR
1812	J.Vollans; Simpson	Read & Co.	Hull–Rio de Janeiro; London–Jamaica	LR
1815	Simpson; E.Davis	Read & Co.	London–Jamaica	LR
1816	Simpson; E.Davis; Shakespeare	Read & Co.	London–Jamaica	LR
1818	Shakespeare; J.Ranking	Read & Co.	London–Jamaica	LR
1819	J.Rankin; Chapman	Read & Co.	Plymouth–West Indies; London–Quebec	LR
1823	Chapman	Stanes & Co.	Liverpool–New Brunswick	LR
1824	Chapman; T.Mever (Muir?)	Stanes & Co. W.Reed	Liverpool–Mrimk (Miramichi?)	LR
1825	T.Mever	Reed & Co.	Liverpool–New Brunswick	LR

A report from Liverpool stated that on 25 December 1824 a hurricane from the west drove Alcyone aground as she was coming from St Johns, New Brunswick. Her stern post broke and she filled with water. The weather was shocking, but it was hoped that it would be possible to remove the timber she was carrying between decks. It was expected that in spring every endeavor would be made to get her off. Alcyone was refloated on 7 January 1825 and taken in to Hoylake, Lancashire.

Year	Master	Owner	Trade	Source & notes
1826	T.Mure	Reed & Co.	Liverpool–Leghorn; Liverpool–"Mhimck"	LR; damages and thorough repair 1824 (Note: The volume of the Register of Shipping (RS) for 1826 gave the name of Alcyone's owner as Haines, and noted that she had had damages repaired in 1825.)
1828	T.Mure	Reice & Co.	Liverpool–Newry	LR; damages and thorough repair 1824; small repairs 1827 (Note: From 1828 on the Register of Shipping showed Alcyone having been almost rebuilt in 1825.)

In 1813 the EIC had lost its monopoly on the trade between India and Britain. British ships were then free to sail to India or the Indian Ocean under a licence from the EIC.

Year	Master	Owner	Trade	Source & notes
1829	T.Mure	Reice & Co.	Liverpool–Bombay	LR; damages and thorough repair 1824; small repairs 1827
1830	T.Mure	Reide & Co.	Liverpool–Petersburg	LR; thorough repair 1824 & small repairs 1827
1833	T.Mure	Reice & Co.	London	LR; damages and thorough repair 1824; small repairs 1827
1836	T.Muir	Reid & Co.	Liverpool–Savannah; Liverpool–Darien	LR; small repairs 1836 and damages repaired 1837
1840	T.Muir; W.Gales	Reid & Co.	Liverpool–Darien; Liverpool–Quebec	LR; small repairs 1836, & damages repaired 1837 & 1840
1841	W.Gales	Reid & Co.	Liverpool–Quebec; Liverpool	LR; small repairs 1836 & 1842, & damages repaired 1837 & 1840
1845	Storr	Hudson & Co.	Liverpool–Ichebo	LR; small repairs 1836 & 1842, & damages repaired 1837 & 1840

Alcyone was at Ichaboe to participate in the guano "gold rush". In the early 1840s the Peruvian government had raised its royalty demands on Peruvian guano, the main source of the fertilizer for the United Kingdom. Andrew Livingstone, was a retired master-mariner, living in Liverpool, where he had a school of navigation. In 1842 he read an account published in New York in 1832, by Benjamin Morrell, an American sealing captain, who wrote about having landed at Ichaboe in 1828 and seen massive deposits of guano. Livingstone was eventually able to convince some Liverpool investors to send out a small exploration expedition of three vessels. By 1844 286 British vessels had visited Ichaboe, and in 1845 679 vessels. The guano deposits were quickly exhausted and interest briefly shifted to smaller deposits of lower quality on Malagas Island in Saldanha Bay.

Alcyone, Storr, master, was reported on 10 March 1845 to be at Table Bay. She had left Ichaboe 20 February and sailed on to Saldanha Bay on 14 March.

== Career ==
Alcyone was last listed in 1847.
