= List of West Virginia railroads =

The following railroads operate in the U.S. state of West Virginia.

== Common freight carriers ==
- Appalachian and Ohio Railroad (AO)
- Beech Mountain Railroad (BEEM)
- CSX Transportation (CSXT)
- Durbin and Greenbrier Valley Railroad (DGVR) operates Durbin Railroad and West Virginia Central Railroad (WVC)
- Elk River Railroad (ELKR)
- Kanawha River Railroad (KNWA)
- Norfolk Southern Railway (NS)
- R.J. Corman Railroad/West Virginia Line (RJCV)
- South Branch Valley Railroad (SBVR)
- Wheeling and Lake Erie Railway (WE)
- Winchester and Western Railroad (WW)

== Private freight carriers ==
- Belpre Industrial Parkersburg Railroad (BIP)
- Kanawha River Terminal Railroad (KRT)
- Little Kanawha River Rail, Inc. (LKRR)
- Short Line Services operates Big Eagle Rail, LLC, lessor of Kanawha Rail Corporation

== Passenger carriers ==
- Amtrak (AMTK)
- Cass Scenic Railroad
- Durbin and Greenbrier Valley Railroad
- MARC
- Potomac Eagle Scenic Railroad
- South Branch Valley Railroad

== Defunct railroads ==
Name	Mark	System (Note: This is one or more of the Class I railroads that the railroad became part of, if any.)	From	To	Successor	Notes
Alexander and Eastern Railway			1906		N/A	
Alexander and Rich Mountain Railroad			1892	1899	Alexander and Rich Mountain Railway	
Alexander and Rich Mountain Railway			1899	1906	Alexander and Eastern Railway	
Allegheny and Western Railway		NYC	1905	1918	Kanawha and West Virginia Railroad	
Atlantic and Northwestern Railroad		NYC	1881	1882	Ohio Central Railroad	
Baltimore and Ohio Railroad	B&O, BO	B&O	1827	1987	Chesapeake and Ohio Railway	
Belington and Beaver Creek Railroad		WM	1899	1905	Western Maryland Railroad	
Belington and Northern Railroad		B&O	1900	1941	N/A	
Benwood and Wheeling Connecting Railway			1900	1960	N/A	
Berkeley Springs Railroad		B&O	1911	1912	Baltimore and Ohio Railroad	
Berkeley Springs and Potomac Railroad		B&O	1880	1910	Berkeley Springs Railroad	
Big Sandy and Cumberland Railroad	BS&C	N&W	1900	1932	Norfolk and Western Railway	
Big Sandy, East Lynn and Guyan Railroad		N&W	1902	1908	Norfolk and Western Railway	
Big Stony Railway		N&W	1910	1915	Norfolk and Western Railway	
Black Fork Railroad			1912	1913	Central West Virginia and Southern Railroad	
Blacksville and Western Railway		MGA	1917	1917	Morgantown and Wheeling Railway	
Blackwater and Potomac Railroad			1915	1922	N/A	
Blue Stone Railroad		N&W	1881	1881	New River Railroad of West Virginia	
Buckhannon and Northern Railroad		MGA	1902	1915	Monongahela Railway	
Buckhannon River Railroad		B&O	1889	1890	West Virginia and Pittsburg Railroad	
Buckhannon River Lumber Company		B&O	1885	1889	Clarksburg, Weston and Midland Railroad	
Buckhannon and West Fork Railroad		B&O	1882	1890	Clarksburg, Weston and Midland Railroad	
Buffalo Creek and Gauley Railroad			1904	1965	Elk River Railroad	
Cairo and Kanawha Railway			1906		N/A	
Cairo and Kanawha Valley Railroad			1890	1906	Cairo and Kanawha Railway	
Campbell's Creek Railroad	CCK		1901	1962	N/A	
Caretta Railway		N&W	1906	1909	Norfolk and Western Railway	
Central Railway of West Virginia		B&O	1898	1902	Morgantown and Kingwood Railroad	
Central West Virginia and Southern Railroad			1913	1936	N/A	
Chaffee Railroad		WM	1918	1950	Western Maryland Railway	
Charleston, Clendenin and Sutton Railroad		B&O	1891	1903	Coal and Coke Railway	
Charleston and Gauley Railway		NYC	1887	1890	Kanawha and Michigan Railway	
Cheat Haven and Bruceton Railroad		B&O	1911	1965	N/A	
Cheat River and Pittsburg Railroad		B&O		1902	Morgantown and Kingwood Railroad	
Cheat Valley Railroad		B&O	1897	1904	Morgantown and Kingwood Railroad	
Chemical and Helvetia Railroad			1909		N/A	
Cherry Run and Potomac Valley Railroad		B&O	1892	1912	Baltimore and Ohio Railroad	
Chesapeake and Ohio Railroad		C&O	1868	1878	Chesapeake and Ohio Railway	
Chesapeake and Ohio Railway	C&O, CO	C&O	1878	1987	CSX Transportation	
Clarksburg, Weston and Glenville Railroad and Transportation Company		B&O	1878	1889	Clarksburg, Weston and Midland Railroad	
Clarksburg, Weston and Midland Railroad		B&O	1890	1890	West Virginia and Pittsburg Railroad	
Clendenin and Spencer Railroad				1904	Kanawha and Northern Railway	
Coal and Coke Railway	C&C	B&O	1902	1933	Baltimore and Ohio Railroad	
Coal and Iron Railway		WM	1899	1905	Western Maryland Railroad	
Coal River Railway		C&O	1905	1909	Chesapeake and Ohio Railway	
Coal River and Western Railway		C&O	1903	1905	Coal River Railway	
Consolidated Rail Corporation	CR		1976	1999	Norfolk Southern Railway	
Covington and Ohio Railroad		C&O	1853	1868	Chesapeake and Ohio Railroad	
Croft Railroad			1910		N/A	
Cross Creek Railroad		P&WV	1900	1904	Wabash Pittsburgh Terminal Railway	
Cumberland and Pennsylvania Railroad	C&PA, CPA	WM	1863	1953	Western Maryland Railway	
Cumberland Valley Railroad		PRR	1873	1919	N/A	Leased the Cumberland Valley and Martinsburg Railroad
Cumberland Valley and Martinsburg Railroad		PRR	1888	1958	Penndel Company	
Deepwater Railway		N&W	1898	1907	Virginian Railway	
Dry Fork Railroad			1892	1913	Central West Virginia and Southern Railroad	
Elk and Little Kanawha Railroad			1909	1919	N/A	
Elm Grove and State Line Railroad		PRR	1883	1884	Wheeling and Harrisburg Railway	
Erbacon and Summersville Railroad			1911		N/A	Erbacon, West Virginia
Everson and Adamsville Railroad		B&O	1902	1903	Monongahela River Railroad	
Fairmont Bingamon Railway		WM	1916	1950	Western Maryland Railway	
Fairmont Helen's Run Railway		WM	1915	1950	Western Maryland Railway	
Fairmont, Morgantown and Pittsburg Railroad		B&O	1883	1989	CSX Transportation	
Fairmont, Shinnston and Clarksburg Railway		B&O	1884	1912	Baltimore and Ohio Railroad	
Gaston Gas Coal Company		B&O	1883	1889	Monongahela River Railroad	
Gauley and Eastern Railway		NYC	1889	1920	Kanawha and West Virginia Railroad	
Gauley and Meadow River Railroad		C&O	1912	1918	Chesapeake and Ohio Railway	
Gauley River Railroad	GRIV		1998	1999	N/A	Never operated
Glade Creek and Raleigh Railroad		C&O	1891	1906	Raleigh and Southwestern Railway	
Glady and Alpena Railroad			1901	1922	N/A	
Glen Jean, Lower Loup and Deepwater Railroad		C&O	1895	1901	Chesapeake and Ohio Railway	
Grafton and Belington Railroad		B&O	1892	1912	Baltimore and Ohio Railroad	
Grafton and Greenbrier Railroad		B&O	1881	1892	Grafton and Belington Railroad	
Greenbrier Railway		C&O	1897	1903	Chesapeake and Ohio Railway	
Greenbrier, Cheat and Elk Railroad		WM	1910	1927	Western Maryland Railway	
Greenbrier and Eastern Railroad		C&O/ NYC	1919	1931	Nicholas, Fayette and Greenbrier Railroad	
Greenbrier and New River Railroad		C&O	1881	1901	Chesapeake and Ohio Railway	
Guyan, Big Ugly and Coal River Railway			1907	1921	N/A	
Guyandotte Valley Railroad Company		C&O	1899	1903	Chesapeake and Ohio Railway	
Guyandotte and Ohio River Railroad and Mineral Company		NYC	1872	1881	Atlantic and Northwestern Railroad	
Hampshire Southern Railroad		B&O	1906	1911	Moorefield and Virginia Railroad	
Harrisville and Cornwallis Railroad			1908	1911	Harrisville Southern Railroad	
Harrisville Southern Railroad			1911		N/A	
Hartland Railroad			1922	1925	Middle Creek Railroad	
Hempfield Railroad		B&O	1851	1871	Wheeling, Pittsburgh and Baltimore Railroad	
Holliday's Cove Railroad		PRR	1860	1868	Pittsburgh, Cincinnati and St. Louis Railway	
Holly River Railroad			1896	1899	Holly River and Addison Railway	
Holly River and Addison Railway			1898	1906	West Virginia Midland Railroad	
Huntington and Big Sandy Railroad		B&O	1890	1912	Baltimore and Ohio Railroad	
Iaeger and Southern Railway		N&W	1898	1906	Norfolk and Western Railway	
Imboden and Odell Railroad		NYC	1903	1905	Kanawha and West Virginia Railroad	
Indian Creek and Northern Railway		MGA	1918	1933	Monongahela Railway	
Interior and West Virginia Railroad		N&W	1906	1910	Big Stony Railway	
Iron Mountain and Greenbrier Railroad				1912	White Sulphur and Huntersville Railroad	
Iron Valley and Morgantown Railroad		B&O	1881	1883	West Virginia Midland Railway	
Island Creek Railroad		C&O	1902	1933	Chesapeake and Ohio Railway	
Kanawha Railway		C&O	1881	1902	Chesapeake and Ohio Railway	
Kanawha Bridge and Terminal Company		C&O	1907	1918	Chesapeake and Ohio Railway	
Kanawha Central Railway	KC		1906	1977	N/A	
Kanawha and Coal River Railroad			1881		N/A	
Kanawha, Glen Jean and Eastern Railroad		C&O	1895	1940	Chesapeake and Ohio Railway	
Kanawha and Michigan Railway	K&M	NYC	1890	1938	Toledo and Ohio Central Railway	
Kanawha and Northern Railway				1906	N/A	
Kanawha and Ohio Railway		NYC	1886	1890	Kanawha and Michigan Railway	
Kanawha and Paint Creek Railroad		C&O	1884	1895	Kanawha and Paint Creek Railway	
Kanawha and Paint Creek Railway		C&O	1895	1902	Kanawha and Pocahontas Railroad	
Kanawha and Pennsylvania Railway		NYC	1903	1917	Kanawha and West Virginia Railroad	
Kanawha and Pocahontas Railroad		C&O	1898	1905	Chesapeake and Ohio Railway	
Kanawha and West Virginia Railroad	K&WV	NYC	1905	1938	Toledo and Ohio Central Railway	
Kelly's Creek Railroad			1916	1964	N/A	
Kelly's Creek and Northwestern Railroad	KCNW		1903	1993	N/A	
Kenova and Big Sandy Railroad		N&W	1902	1904	Norfolk and Western Railway	
Kingwood Railway			1882	1888	Tunnelton, Kingwood and Fairchance Railroad	
Little Kanawha Railroad		B&O	1896	1937	N/A	
Logan and Southern Railway		C&O	1907	1918	Chesapeake and Ohio Railway	
Loop and Lookout Railroad		C&O/ NYC	1907	1931	Nicholas, Fayette and Greenbrier Railroad	
Lorama Railroad			1903	1924	N/A	
Mann's Creek Railroad			1886	1955	N/A	
Marlinton and Camden Railroad			1903		N/A	
Martinsburg and Potomac Railroad		PRR	1868	1888	Cumberland Valley and Martinsburg Railroad	
Middle Creek Railroad			1925	1951	N/A	
Monongah and Ohio River Railroad		B&O	1895	ca. 1900	Monongahela River Railroad	
Monongahela Railway	MGA	MGA	1915	1993	Consolidated Rail Corporation	
Monongahela River Railroad		B&O	1888	1912	Baltimore and Ohio Railroad	
Moorefield and Virginia Railroad		B&O	1910	1912	Baltimore and Ohio Railroad	
Morgantown and Dunkard Valley Railroad		MGA	1905	1913	Morgantown and Wheeling Railway	
Morgantown and Kingwood Railroad	M&K	B&O	1899		Baltimore and Ohio Railroad	
Morgantown and Wheeling Railway	M&W	MGA	1912	1923	Scotts Run Railway	
New River Railroad, Mining and Manufacturing Company of West Virginia		N&W	1874	1881	New River Railroad of West Virginia	
New River Railroad of West Virginia		N&W	1881	1882	Norfolk and Western Railroad	
New River Bridge Company		C&O	1887	1890	Chesapeake and Ohio Railway	
New York Central Railroad	NYC	NYC	1922	1968	Penn Central Transportation Company	
New York, Chicago and St. Louis Railroad	NKP	NKP	1949	1964	Norfolk and Western Railway	
Nicholas, Fayette and Greenbrier Railroad		C&O/ NYC	1926	1996	Consolidated Rail Corporation, CSX Transportation	
Norfolk and Western Railroad		N&W	1882	1896	Norfolk and Western Railway	
Norfolk and Western Railway	N&W, NW	N&W	1896	1998	Norfolk Southern Railway	
North Western Virginia Railroad		B&O	1851	1865	Parkersburg Branch Railroad	
Ohio Central Railroad		NYC	1882	1885	Kanawha and Ohio Railway	
Ohio and Little Kanawha Railroad		B&O	1900	1910	Baltimore and Ohio Railroad	
Ohio River Railroad		B&O	1882	1912	Baltimore and Ohio Railroad	
Pan Handle Railroad		PRR	1868	1871	Pittsburgh, Wheeling and Kentucky Railroad	
Pan Handle Railway		PRR	1867	1868	Pittsburgh, Cincinnati and St. Louis Railway	
Panther Railroad			1895		N/A	
Parkersburg Branch Railroad		B&O	1865	1912	Baltimore and Ohio Railroad	
Patterson's Creek and Potomac Railroad		B&O	1900	1912	Baltimore and Ohio Railroad	
Paw Paw Railroad		B&O	1900	1912	Baltimore and Ohio Railroad	
Penn Central Transportation Company	PC		1968	1976	Consolidated Rail Corporation	
Penndel Company		PRR	1954	1976	Consolidated Rail Corporation	
Pennsboro and Harrisville Railroad			1873	1879	Pennsboro and Harrisville Ritchie County Railway	
Pennsboro and Harrisville Ritchie County Railway			1880	1905	Lorama Railroad	
Pennsylvania Railroad	PRR	PRR	1920	1968	Penn Central Transportation Company	
Philadelphia, Baltimore and Washington Railroad		PRR	1956	1976	Consolidated Rail Corporation	
Pickens and Addison Railway			1903		N/A	
Pickens and Hackers Valley Railroad			1899	1921	N/A	
Pickens and Webster Springs Railroad			1912	1915	N/A	
Piedmont and Cumberland Railway		WM	1886	1905	Western Maryland Railroad	
Piney River and Paint Creek Railroad		C&O	1905	1918	Chesapeake and Ohio Railway	
Pittsburgh, Cincinnati, Chicago and St. Louis Railroad		PRR	1917	1956	Philadelphia, Baltimore and Washington Railroad	
Pittsburgh, Cincinnati, Chicago and St. Louis Railway		PRR	1890	1917	Pittsburgh, Cincinnati, Chicago and St. Louis Railroad	
Pittsburgh, Cincinnati and St. Louis Railway		PRR	1868	1890	Pittsburgh, Cincinnati, Chicago and St. Louis Railway	
Pittsburgh Southern Railway		B&O	1881	1884	N/A	Sold at foreclosure; no property in West Virginia
Pittsburg and Steubenville Railroad		PRR	1856	1867	Pan Handle Railway	
Pittsburgh and West Virginia Railroad			1967			Still exists as a lessor of the Wheeling and Lake Erie Railway
Pittsburgh and West Virginia Railway	P&WV	P&WV	1916	1967	Pittsburgh and West Virginia Railroad	
Pittsburgh, Wheeling and Kentucky Railroad		PRR	1871	1917	Pittsburgh, Cincinnati, Chicago and St. Louis Railroad	
Pocahontas Railroad			1901		N/A	
Pocahontas, Coal River and Kanawha Railway		C&O	1899	1903	Coal River and Western Railway	
Point Pleasant Bridge Company		NYC	1886	1935	Kanawha and Michigan Railway	
Point Pleasant, Buckhannon and Tygart's Valley Railroad		B&O	1892	1912	Baltimore and Ohio Railroad	
Point Pleasant and Ohio River Railroad		NYC	1881	1885	Kanawha and Michigan Railway, Point Pleasant Bridge Company	
Pond Fork Railway		C&O	1915	1918	Chesapeake and Ohio Railway	
Pond Fork and Bald Knob Railroad		C&O	1919	1933	Chesapeake and Ohio Railway	
Porters Creek and Gauley Railroad			1896	1904	N/A	
Potomac and Piedmont Coal and Railroad Company		WM	1866	1881	West Virginia Central and Pittsburg Railway	
Potomac Valley Railroad of West Virginia		WM	1890	1905	Western Maryland Railroad	
Powellton and Pocahontas Railway		C&O	1891	1902	Chesapeake and Ohio Railway	
Preston Railroad			1897	1960	N/A	
Raleigh and Pocahontas Railroad			1902		N/A	
Raleigh and Southwestern Railway		C&O	1903	1910	Chesapeake and Ohio Railway	
Ravenswood, Spencer and Glenville Railway		B&O	1886	1912	Baltimore and Ohio Railroad	
Richwood and Gauley Railroad			1911		N/A	
Richmond, Toledo and Chicago Railroad		NYC	1881	1881	Atlantic and Northwestern Railroad	
Ripley and Mill Creek Valley Railroad		B&O	1886	1912	Baltimore and Ohio Railroad	
Roaring Creek and Belington Railroad		B&O	1893	1919	Coal and Coke Railway	
Roaring Creek and Charleston Railroad		B&O	1893	1904	Roaring Creek and Belington Railroad	
Rowlesburg and Southern Railroad			1911	1950	N/A	
Scotts Run Railway		MGA	1923	1933	Monongahela Railway	
Sewell Valley Railroad		C&O/ NYC	1907	1931	Nicholas, Fayette and Greenbrier Railroad	
Shenandoah Valley Railroad		N&W	1870	1890	Shenandoah Valley Railway	
Shenandoah Valley Railway		N&W	1890	1890	Norfolk and Western Railroad	
South Branch Railway		B&O	1871	1912	Baltimore and Ohio Railroad	
Strouds Creek and Muddlety Railroad	SCM	B&O	1904	2000	N/A	Most recently subleased to the Gauley River Railroad
Tug River and Kentucky Railroad		N&W	1913	1936	Norfolk and Western Railway	
Tunnelton, Kingwood and Fairchance Railroad			1888	1899	West Virginia Northern Railroad	
Twin Mountain and Potomac Railroad			1911	1919	N/A	
Valley River Railroad			1907	1931	N/A	
Virginia–Maryland Coal Corporation		B&O	1907	1912	Monongahela River Railroad	
Virginian Railway	VGN	N&W	1907	1959	Norfolk and Western Railway	
Virginian and Western Railway		N&W	1922	1936	Virginian Railway	
Virginian–Wyoming Railway		N&W	1919	1922	Virginian and Western Railway	
Wabash Pittsburgh Terminal Railway	WPT	P&WV	1904	1916	Pittsburgh and West Virginia Railway	
Walkersville and Ireland Railroad			1907	1924	Walkersville and Southern Railroad	
Walkersville and Southern Railroad			1924	1930	N/A	
Wardensville Railroad			1929	1929	Winchester and Wardensville Railroad	
Waynesburg Southern Railroad	WAS	MGA	1966	1976	Consolidated Rail Corporation	
West Virginia Railroad		B&O	1886	1897	Morgantown and Kingwood Railroad	
West Virginia Central and Pittsburg Railway		WM	1881	1905	Western Maryland Railroad	
West Virginia and Ironton Railroad		N&W	1888	1890	Norfolk and Western Railroad	
West Virginia Midland Railroad			1905	1924	West Virginia Midland Railway	
West Virginia Midland Railway			1924	1931	N/A	
West Virginia Midland Railway		B&O	1883	1886	Fairmont, Morgantown and Pittsburg Railroad, West Virginia Railroad	
West Virginia Northern Railroad	WVN		1899	1991	N/A	Continued as a tourist railroad until 1999
West Virginia and Pittsburg Railroad		B&O	1890	1912	Baltimore and Ohio Railroad	
West Virginia Short Line Railroad		B&O	1895	1912	Baltimore and Ohio Railroad	
West Virginia South Western Railroad		N&W	1902	1909	Norfolk and Western Railway	
West Virginia and Southern Railroad			1897		N/A	
WV Southern Railway	WVSR		2003	2005	R.J. Corman Railroad/West Virginia Line	
West Virginia Southern Railway			1895	1897	West Virginia and Southern Railroad	
Western Maryland Railroad		WM	1905	1909	Western Maryland Railway	
Western Maryland Railway	WM	WM	1909	1989	CSX Transportation	
Weston and Buckhannon Railroad		B&O	1882	1890	Clarksburg, Weston and Midland Railroad	
Weston and Centreville Railroad		B&O	1882	1882	Weston and Buckhannon Railroad	
Weston and Elk River Railroad		B&O	1889	1889	Clarksburg, Weston and Midland Railroad	
Weston and West Fork Railroad		B&O	1875	1889	Clarksburg, Weston and Midland Railroad	
Wheeling Bridge and Terminal Railway		PRR	1889	1900	Wheeling Terminal Railway	
Wheeling and Harrisburg Railway		PRR	1882	1889	Wheeling Bridge and Terminal Railway	
Wheeling and Lake Erie Railroad		NKP	1899	1916	Wheeling and Lake Erie Railway	
Wheeling and Lake Erie Railway		NKP	1890	1899	Wheeling and Lake Erie Railroad	
Wheeling and Lake Erie Railway	W&LE, WLE	NKP	1916	1949	New York, Chicago and St. Louis Railroad	
Wheeling, Parkersburg and Charleston Railway		B&O	1881	1882	Ohio River Railroad	
Wheeling, Pittsburgh and Baltimore Railroad		B&O	1872			
Wheeling Terminal Railway		PRR	1900	1954	Penndel Company	
White Oak Railway		C&O, N&W	1905	1917	Chesapeake and Ohio Railway, Virginian Railway	
White Sulphur and Huntersville Railroad			1912		N/A	
Williamson and Pond Creek Railroad		N&W	1912	1936	Norfolk and Western Railway	
Williamsport, Nessle and Martinsburg Railway		WM	1913	1937	Western Maryland Railway	
Winchester and Potomac Railroad		B&O	1831	1987	CSX Transportation	
Winchester and Wardensville Railroad			1929	1934	N/A	
Winchester and Western Railroad			1916	1930	Winchester and Wardensville Railroad	
Winding Gulf Railroad			1906		N/A	
Winifrede Railroad	WNFR		1881	1987	Kanawha Rail Corporation	

Electric

- Appalachian Power Company
- Charleston–Dunbar Traction Company
- Charleston Interurban Railroad
- City Railway
- East Liverpool Traction and Light Company
- Grafton Light and Power Company
- Kanawha Traction and Electric Company
- Lewisburg and Ronceverte Electric Railway
- Martinsburg Street Railway
- Monongahela Valley Traction Company
- Morgantown and Pittsburgh Railway
- Morgantown and Wheeling Railway
- Newell Bridge and Railway Company
- Ohio Valley Electric Railway
- Pan Handle Traction Company
- Parkersburg and Ohio Valley Electric Railway
- Princeton Power Company
- South Morgantown Traction Company
- Steubenville, East Liverpool and Beaver Valley Traction Company
- Steubenville, Wellsburg and Weirton Railway
- Tyler Traction Company
- Union Traction Company
- Wellsburg, Bethany and Washington Railway
- West Virginia Traction and Electric Company
- Wheeling and Elm Grove Railway
- Wheeling Traction Company
