= Guyandotte Valley Railroad Company =

Railroad company in the USA

The Guyandotte Valley Railroad Company was incorporated by the State of West Virginia on March 1, 1899. Under supervision of the Chesapeake and Ohio Railway, the GVRR constructed 50.2 miles of single track, standard gauge railroad line between Barboursville in Cabell County to Big Creek in Logan County. On October 31, 1903, the C&O acquired its franchise, rights, and property.

As a result of the Guyandotte Valley Railroad Company's diligent work, the rich timber and coal regions of the Guyandotte Valley were better connected to larger markets. It led to the development or growth of such towns as West Hamlin, Branchland, Midkiff, Brady, Ranger, Gill, Sand Creek, Atenville, Eden Park, Harts, Ferrellsburg, Green Shoal, and Big Creek.
