= Union, Gaffney City and Rutherfordton Railroad =

The Union, Gaffney City and Rutherfordton Railroad was a railroad chartered by the South Carolina General Assembly shortly after the end of Reconstruction.

The Union, Gaffney City and Rutherfordton Railroad was chartered by the South Carolina General Assembly in 1878. The line changed its name to the Atlantic and Northwestern Railroad in 1885.

In 1887, the Atlantic and Northwestern Railroad merged with the Augusta, Edgefield and Newberry Railroad to create the Georgia and Carolina Midland Railroad.
