= Eden Park (disambiguation) =

Eden Park is the main sports ground in Auckland, New Zealand.

Eden Park may also refer to:

- Eden Park, London, a suburb in the London Borough of Bromley, England
  - Eden Park railway station
- Eden Park (Cincinnati), a public park in Cincinnati, Ohio
- Eden Park, West Virginia
- Eden Park, Victoria, a rural locality north of Melbourne, Australia
- Eden Park, Colorado, historical name for Indian Hills, Colorado
- Eden Park, historic building in Marryatville, South Australia, now part of Marryatville High School
