= Augusta and Edgefield Railroad =

American railroad founded 1884

The Augusta and Edgefield Railroad was a South Carolina railroad chartered by the state's General Assembly in 1884.

In late December 1886, the Augusta and Edgefield's charter was amended to change the carrier's name to the Augusta, Edgefield and Newberry Railroad.
