= West Virginia Central and Pittsburg Railway =

Map

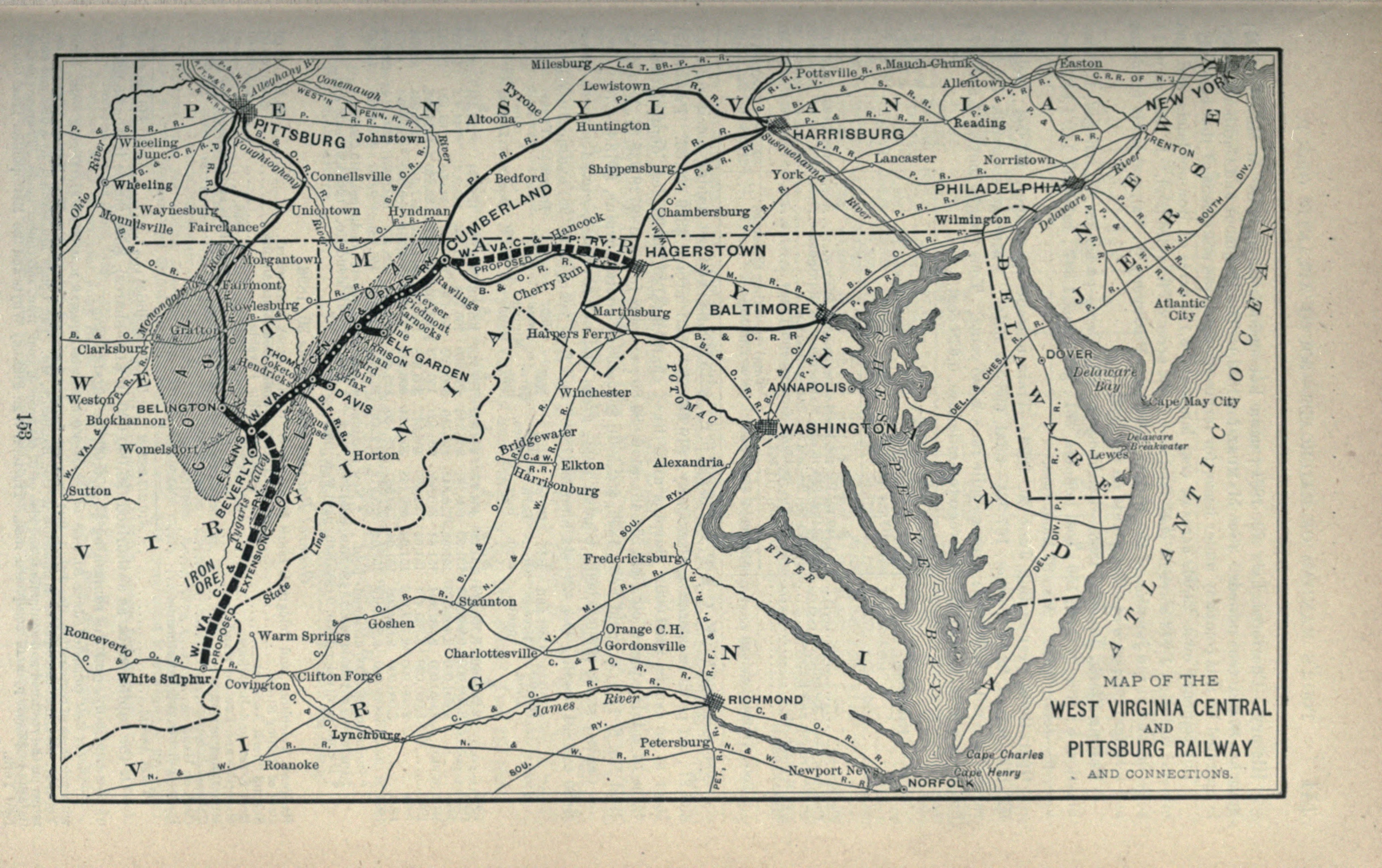

The West Virginia Central and Pittsburg Railway (WVC&P) was a railroad in West Virginia and Maryland operating in the late 19th and early 20th centuries. It had main lines radiating from Elkins, West Virginia in four principal directions: north to Cumberland, Maryland; west to Belington, WV; south to Huttonsville, WV; and east to Durbin, WV. Some of the routes were constructed through subsidiary companies, the Piedmont and Cumberland Railway and the Coal and Iron Railway.

== History ==
West Virginia businessman Henry G. Davis founded the Potomac and Piedmont Coal and Railroad Company in 1866. In 1880 the company began to construct a rail line from a junction on the Baltimore and Ohio Railroad (B&O) near Bloomington, Maryland, south along the North Branch Potomac River. In 1881 the line reached coal fields near Elk Garden, WV, and Davis obtained new charters from the states of West Virginia and Maryland, renaming the company as WVC&P.

By 1884 the line reached Fairfax, WV and the location of the future town of Davis, WV. Davis became a center for logging, sawmills and leather tanning, and in the 1890s it was the starting point for the rapidly growing Davis Coal and Coke Company. In 1886 the WVC&P began construction north from the Bloomington junction (known as WVC Junction) toward Westernport, Maryland and Cumberland, using a newly created subsidiary, the Piedmont and Cumberland (P&C). The P&C reached Cumberland in July 1887. Connections with the B&O were established at Cumberland and Rawlings, Maryland.

Southward construction on the WVC&P continued, and the line reached Parsons in 1888 and Elkins (formerly Leadville) in 1889. Elkins became a major hub for the railroad. A branch out of Elkins west and north along the Tygart Valley River was constructed and reached Belington in 1891. Another branch followed the river south, reaching Beverly in 1891 and Huttonsville in 1899.

In 1899 the WVC&P established the Coal and Iron Railway (C&I) to build a line from Elkins to Durbin. By 1903 the line to Durbin was complete and a connection was made there with the Chesapeake and Ohio Railway (C&O).

== Acquisition ==
The WVC&P and subsidiaries were sold to the Fuller Syndicate, led by George Gould, in 1902 and merged into the Western Maryland Railway (WM) in 1905. The newly built WM connected to the WVC&P in Ridgeley, WV. The WM was taken over by the Chessie System in 1973, and the Chessie System in turn was merged out of existence and into CSX Transportation in 1980.

== Current Operation ==
Portions of the original WVC&P lines are used by CSX for freight operations. Other portions are owned by the West Virginia State Rail Authority, which contracts with the Durbin and Greenbrier Valley Railroad to operate a tourist railroad from Elkins, Belington and Durbin.

== See also ==
- Durbin and Greenbrier Valley Railroad
- List of defunct Maryland railroads
- List of defunct West Virginia railroads
