= Georgia and Carolina Midland Railroad =

Railroad company

The Georgia and Carolina Midland Railroad was a Southeastern railroad company created in the late 19th century by the merger of two existing southern carriers.

The Georgia and Carolina Midland Railroad was created in 1887 when the Augusta, Edgefield and Newberry Railroad was consolidated with the Atlantic and Northwestern Railroad.

The Georgia and Carolina Midland merged with the Charleston, Cincinnati and Chicago Railroad in August 1887, a move approved by the South Carolina General Assembly in December of that same.
