= Simpson Tunnel =

Tunnel in Fayette County, Pennsylvania, U.S.

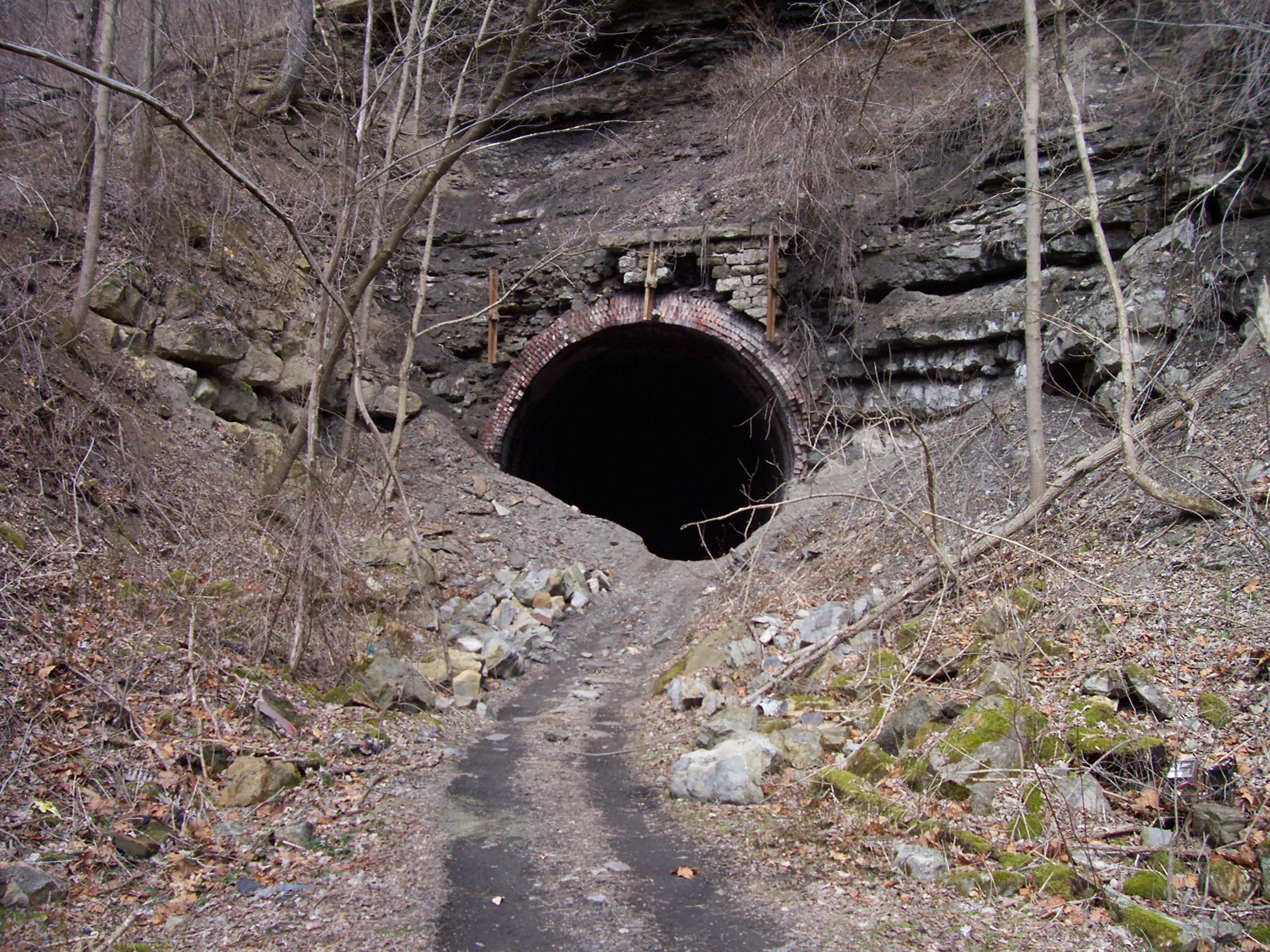
- South portal in 2006
- Interactive map of Simpson Tunnel

Overview
- Location: Fayette County, Pennsylvania
- Coordinates: 39°59′41″N 79°53′39″W
- Status: destroyed
- System: Monongahela Railway (defunct)

Operation
- Opened: 1903
- Closed: 1976 (rail line abandoned)

Technical
- Length: 870 feet (270 m)
- No. of tracks: Single
- Track gauge: 4 ft 8 1/2 in (1,435 mm) standard gauge
- Max elevation: 890 feet (270 m)
- Grade: 0.01%

The Simpson Tunnel, so named for the Simpson Farm it passed under, was a railroad tunnel originally built in 1903 by U.S. Steel and subsequently used by the Dunlap Creek branch of the Monongahela Railway. The tunnel was made of stone with a brick arch construction. The line was utilized both to serve coal mines and coke works in the area and to interchange with the Baltimore and Ohio Railroad's Fairmont, Morgantown and Pittsburgh line and the Pennsylvania Railroad's Coal Lick Run branch. The last move on that line, and thus through the tunnel, was on November 6, 1975. The line was subsequently abandoned by 1976 and the real estate disposed, however the tunnel was not destroyed or blocked at the time. At some point between 2008 and 2010 the tunnel was destroyed, likely due to the construction of the Mon-Fayette Expressway. It is not clear whether the tunnel was blasted or simply filled in.
