= Coal and Iron Railway =

Railroad in West Virginia

Map

The Coal and Iron Railway (C&I) was a railroad in West Virginia. Its main line ran from Elkins to Durbin. The C&I was a subsidiary of the West Virginia Central and Pittsburg Railway (WVC&P) and was later acquired by the Western Maryland Railway (WM).

== History ==
The railroad was founded by Henry G. Davis, in 1899 as an extension of the WVC&P system, also controlled by Davis. The rail line was built over Valley Mountain, along the Shavers Fork valley and the West Fork of the Greenbrier River. By 1903 the construction of the rail line was completed to Durbin, where it connected with the Chesapeake and Ohio Railway (C&O).

Locomotives on the C&I were operated by the WVC&P. In 1905 the C&I was acquired by the WM.

== See also ==
- Durbin and Greenbrier Valley Railroad
- List of defunct West Virginia railroads
