= Atlantic and Northwestern Railroad =

The Atlantic and Northwestern Railroad was a railroad that served the Upstate region in the period after Reconstruction.

The Atlantic and Northwestern was formed when the Union, Gaffney City and Rutherfordton Railroad, chartered by the South Carolina General Assembly in 1878, changed its name to the Atlantic and Northwestern in 1885.

In 1887, the Atlantic and Northwestern Railroad merged with the Augusta, Edgefield and Newberry Railroad to create the Georgia and Carolina Midland Railroad.
