= Monongahela Railway =

Former coal-hauling short line railroad in the United States

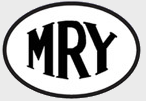

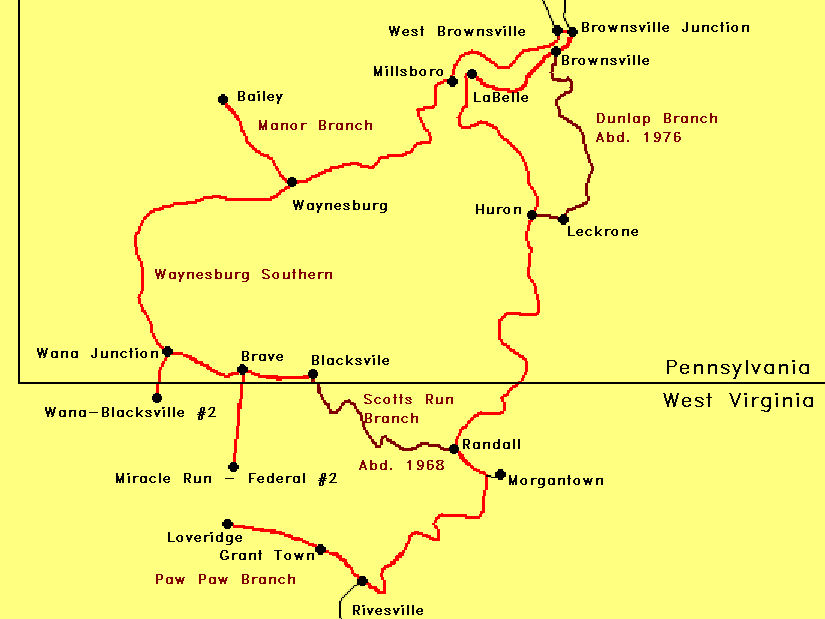

Overview
- Reporting mark: MGA
- Locale: Pennsylvania and West Virginia
- Dates of operation: 1900–May 1, 1993
- Successor: Conrail now Norfolk Southern and CSX

Technical
- Track gauge: 4 ft 8 1/2 in (1,435 mm) standard gauge

The Monongahela Railway (reporting mark MGA) was a coal-hauling Class II railroad in Pennsylvania and West Virginia in the United States. It was jointly controlled originally by the Pennsylvania Railroad, New York Central subsidiary Pittsburgh and Lake Erie Railroad, and the Baltimore and Ohio Railroad, with NYC and PRR later succeeded by Penn Central Transportation. The company operated its own line until it was merged into Conrail on May 1, 1993.

The primary connection to both controlling systems was at Brownsville, Pennsylvania - with the south end of the P&LE's Pittsburgh, McKeesport and Youghiogheny Railroad and with the PRR's ex-Brownsville Railway. The PRR also interchanged traffic at Hoover, Pennsylvania, the end of its Coal Lick Run Branch. The B&O Railroad interchanged at Leckrone, Pennsylvania, and Rivesville, West Virginia.

At the end of 1970 it operated 193 miles of road on 281 miles of track; that year it reported 446 million ton-miles of revenue freight.

== History ==
The Monongahela Railroad's headquarters and base of operations was Brownsville, Pennsylvania. "As early as 1883, the Pittsburgh, Virginia & Charleston Railway served Brownsville as evidenced by an old lithograph of the Three Towns showing a diamond stacked locomotive coupled to four passenger cars, ready for a northward move, sitting on the track close to the Snowden House and the United States Post Office. However, the June, 1893, Official Guide (page 324), does not indicate any passenger service to Brownsville off the Redstone Branch."

The Monongahela Railroad was a joint venture of the Pennsylvania Railroad (PRR) and the Pittsburgh and Lake Erie Railroad (P&LE), both of which had plans to extend their lines in the area. Each company appointed four of their members to the board of directors, who held their first meeting in January 1901. The newly formed Monongahela Railroad acquired many lines in the area from the PV&C as well as the Southwest Pennsylvania Railway Company, as well as the 19 mile (30 km) right of way from Brownsville to Adah from the PRR, for the sum of $519,696.13.

In 1905 the Dunlap Creek branch opened, serving several mines and coke works and also connecting with the Baltimore and Ohio Railroad. The last move on this line was on November 6, 1975; the track was removed and the real estate disposed.

In 1909 the 4.2 mi (6.8 km) Rush Run branch was constructed, and a patch town (Sarah, Pennsylvania) was constructed to house the workers at what was to have been a coal mine. It was later determined that the coal did not belong to the mine developer, and the line was abandoned, the town was scrapped. Only four trains ever ran on this line, those carrying the ballast to complete the track.

In 1910 the federal government condemned the low-clearance covered bridge in Bridgeport (now South Brownsville), and the Monongahela Railroad bought the bridge company and removed the bridge. In the same year they installed a 10-stall roundhouse in Bridgeport. This was to be the main yard for the railroad throughout its history.

In 1911 the railroad served seven mines and fifty one coke works (with 34 coke works and 1 mine being on the Dunlap Creek Division) The daily rated output was 1,395 cars of coke and 280 cars of coal. In 1911-1912 the big push was the state line extension, to make a connection with the Buckhannon and Northern Railway (B&N). It involved a major river crossing and two large creek crossings.

On July 1, 1915 the Monongahela Railroad consolidated with the Buckhannon and Northern Railway to form the Monongahela Railway Company (MRY), still under the control of the parent companies (PRR and P&LE).

In 1927 the Baltimore and Ohio railroad acquired 1/3 (1/6 from each the PRR and P&LE) of the capital stock of the Monongahela Railway, securing their interests in the coal-producing area it served.

On January 1, 1930 the Ten Mile Run branch opened. This branch still serves one major coal mine, the Emerald Mine in Waynesburg, as of 2015.

On October 21, 1950 the Monongahela Railway discontinued passenger service.

On November 25, 1952 the Monongahela Railway ran its first Baldwin S-12 diesel locomotive. This marked the beginning of the end of their fleet of steam locomotives, the last one of which being used on May 26, 1954.

In June 1968 the Waynesburg Southern Railroad Company (organized in the interest of the PRR) opened a line from Waynesburg to Consolidated Coal Company's Blacksville No. 1 mine and Eastern Gas & Fuel Company's Federal No. 2 mine. This line is still in service as of 2015, although Blacksville No. 1 has closed while a third mine in the same area, Blacksville No. 2, is active.

On May 1, 1993 the Monongahela Railway was merged into the Consolidated Rail Corporation (Conrail), which had previously bought out the shares of B&O successor CSX Transportation and Pittsburgh & Lake Erie. Conrail would be bought in 1998 by Norfolk Southern and CSX. Eleven GE Class B23-7Rs (sometimes referred to as Super 7s), the Monongahela's final locomotive fleet numbered 2300–2310, were renumbered 2030-2040 by Conrail, then divided between NS and CSX when they operationally took over Conrail operations in 1999.

== Heritage unit ==
In 2012, Norfolk Southern celebrated 30 years of being formed, and painted 20 locomotives in predecessor schemes to honor its heritage. Nineteen of them were new deliveries, but when NS decided to included the Monongahela in the program, it selected GE ES44AC #8025 (already in service in standard NS paint) to be painted into the Monongahela scheme.

== See also ==
- The Monongahela Connecting Railroad with which it should not be confused
- System map of the Monongahela Railway with other railroads, 1935
- Simpson Tunnel
