= Kanawha Bridge =

Railroad bridge in West Virginia, U.S.

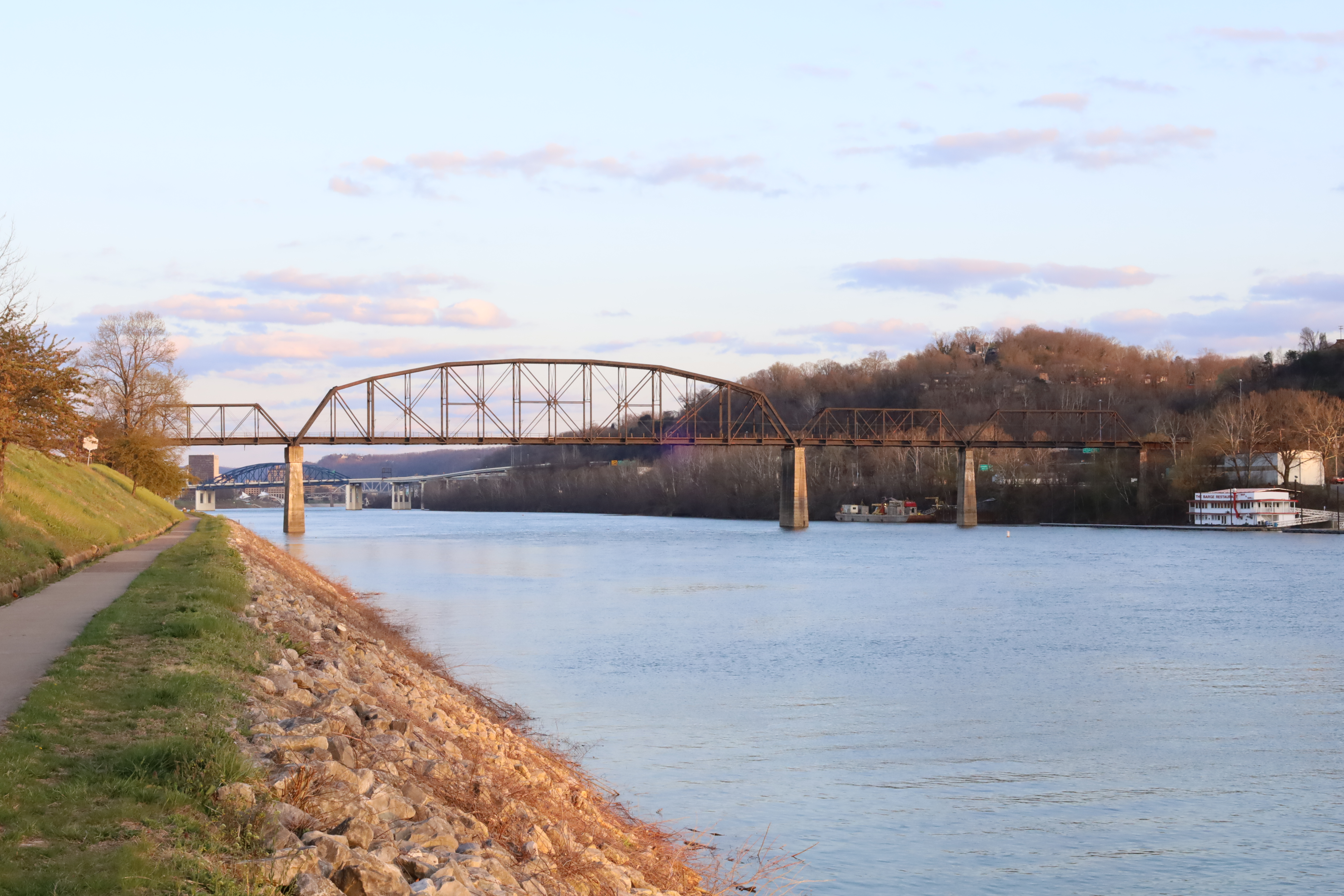
- The bridge in 2022
- Coordinates: 38°21′44″N 81°39′44″W
- Carries: Railroad
- Crosses: Kanawha River
- Locale: Charleston, West Virginia

History
- Constructed by: American Bridge Company
- Built: 1907

The Kanawha Bridge is an abandoned railway bridge over the Kanawha River in Charleston, West Virginia. The bridge is of a Parker through-truss design. The bridge is located east of the Patrick Street Bridge and is now named the "Travis L. Castle Railroad Trestle."

== History ==
Kanawha Bridge and Terminal Company
Overview
- Locale: Charleston, West Virginia
- Dates of operation: 1907–

Technical
- Track gauge: 4 ft 8 1/2 in (1,435 mm) standard gauge

The bridge was built by the American Bridge Company in 1907. It came to be jointly used by the Chesapeake and Ohio Railway, the Charleston Interurban Company, vehicular, and pedestrian traffic.

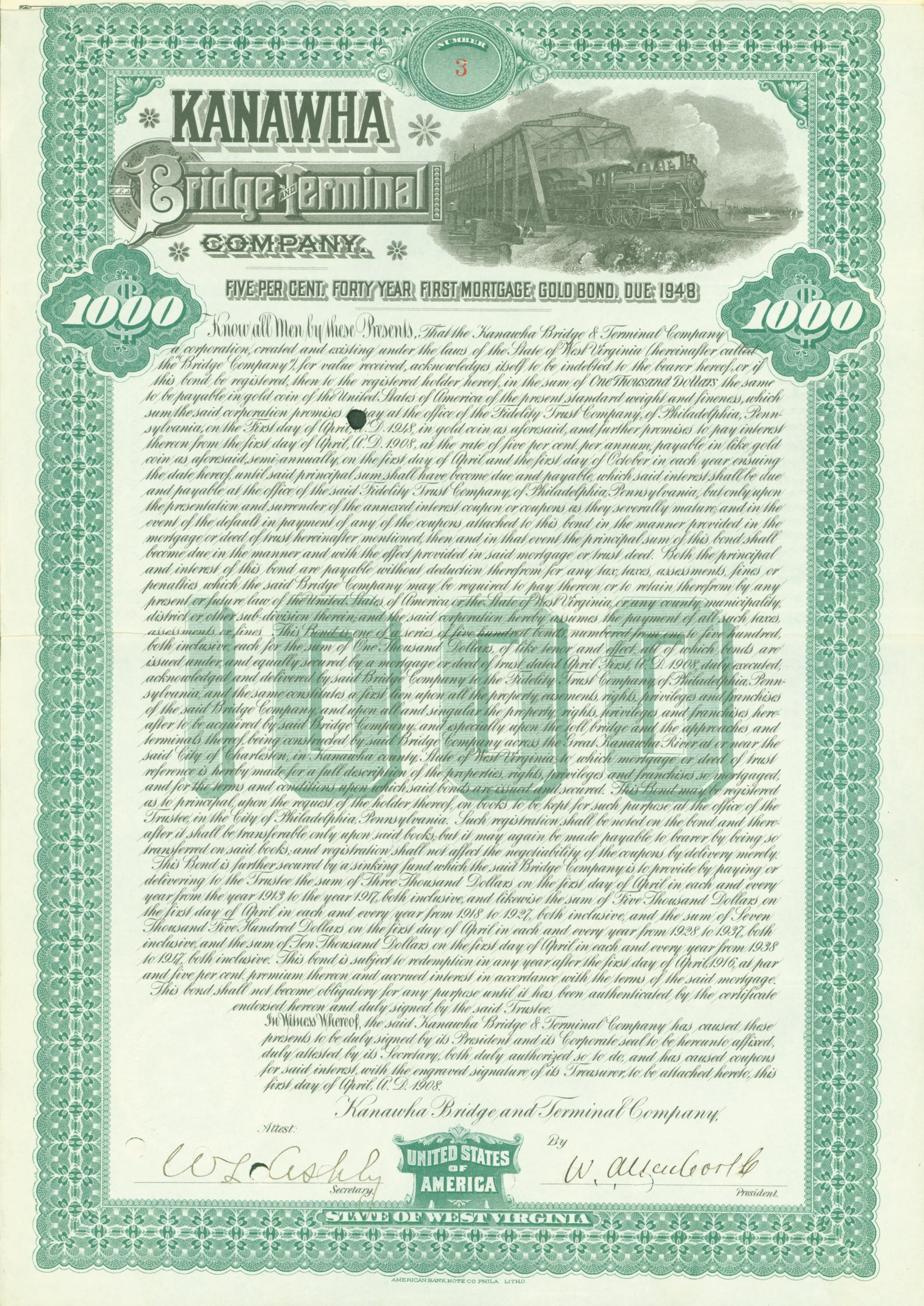
Gold Bond of the Kanawha Bridge and Terminal Company, issued 1 April 1908

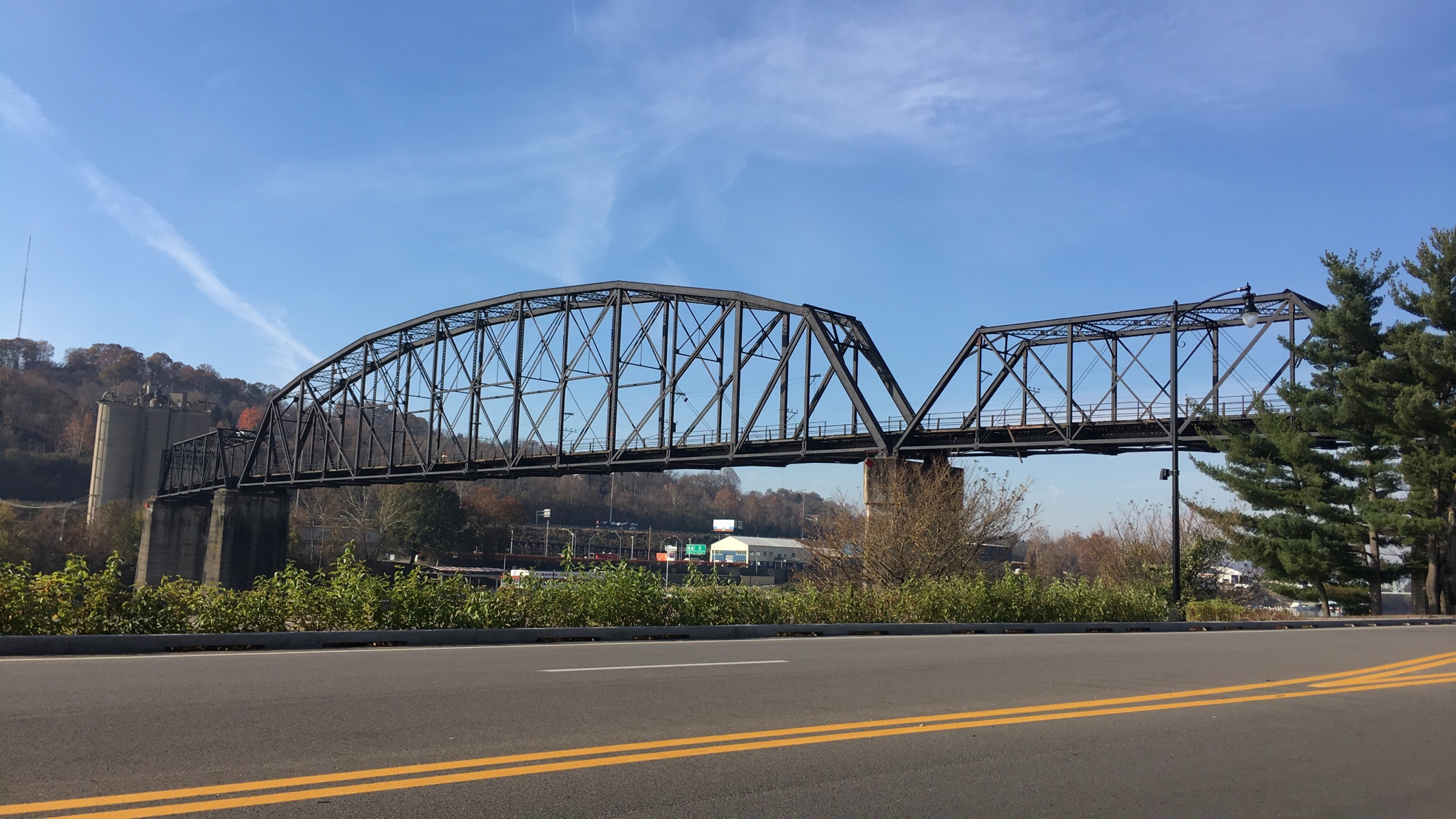
The bridge in 2018

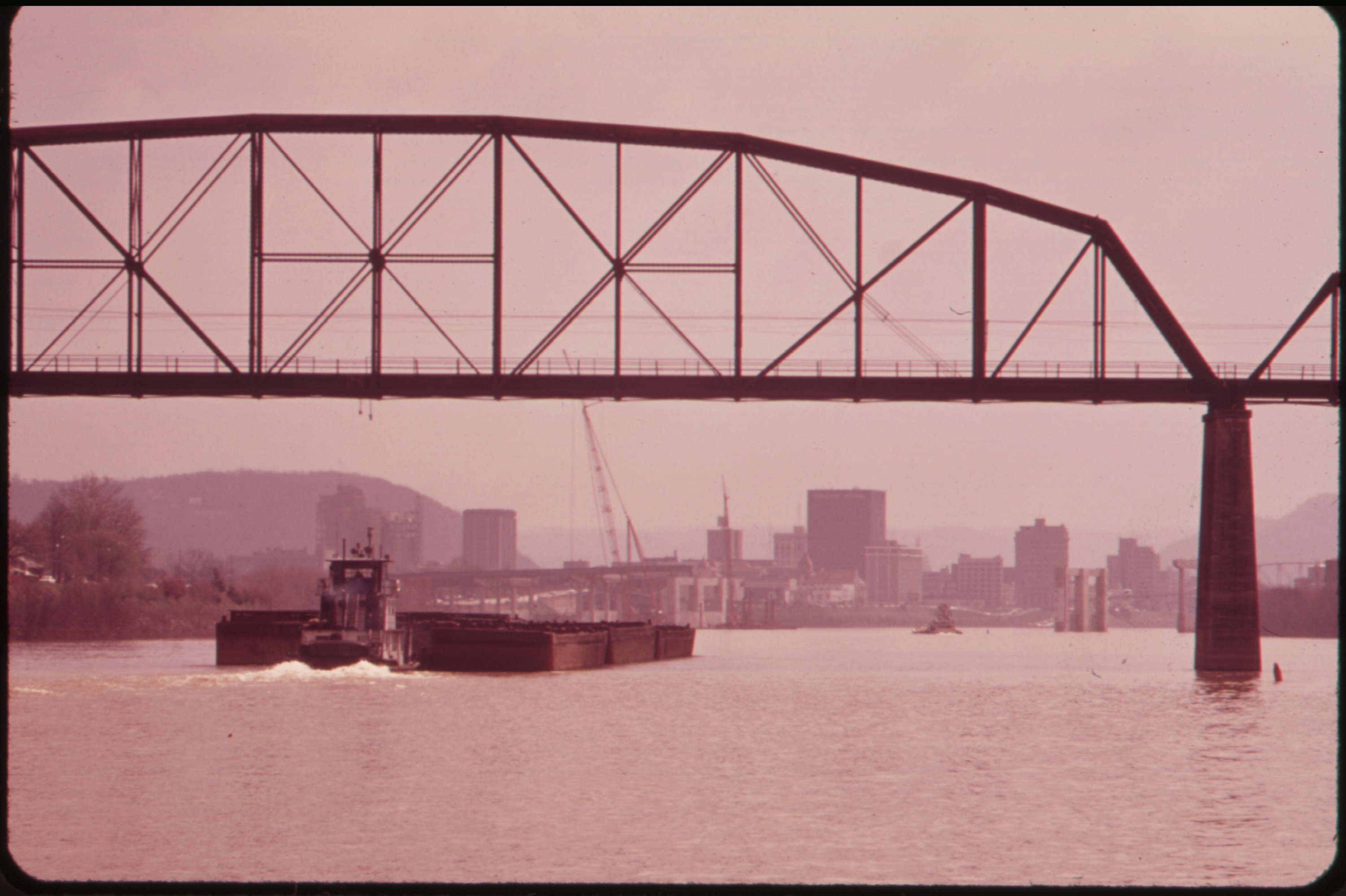
The bridge in 1973

The Kanawha Bridge and Terminal Company was a bridge corporation, incorporated under the laws of West Virginia in 1907. The company owned the bridge and terminal facilities, along with 1.038 miles (1.670 km) of track, all located at Charleston, West Virginia.

The Chesapeake and Ohio Railway purchased the Kanawha Bridge and Terminal in 1910 and used it to connect itself with the Kanawha and Michigan Railway on the north side of the river. The Kanawha and Michigan Railway was a Lake Shore and Michigan Southern Railway affiliate that was acquired by the New York Central Railroad and is now part of Norfolk Southern Railway's West Virginia Secondary.

The bridge was last used for rail traffic in the 1980s. In the 2000s, the City of Charleston explored utilizing the bridge as a river crossing for a proposed bicycle trail network, but by 2019 the proposal had been tabled due to the estimated costs of renovating the bridge.
