= Big Creek, West Virginia =

- Census-designated place
- Location within West Virginia Location within the United States
- Coordinates: 38°00′15″N 82°02′24″W
- Country: United States
- State: West Virginia
- County: Logan

Area
  - Total: 0.581 sq mi (1.50 km^{2})
  - Land: 0.581 sq mi (1.50 km^{2})
  - Water: 0 sq mi (0 km^{2})
- Elevation: 633 ft (193 m)

Population (2020 census)
  - Total: 195
  - Density: 336/sq mi (130/km^{2})
- Time zone: UTC-5 (Eastern (EST))
  - Summer (DST): UTC-4 (EDT)
- ZIP code: 25505
- Area codes: 304 & 681
- GNIS feature ID: 1553892

Big Creek is a census-designated place (CDP) in Logan County, West Virginia, United States. Big Creek is located on West Virginia Route 10, 2.5 miles (4.0 km) northwest of Chapmanville. Big Creek has a post office with ZIP code 25505. As of the 2020 census, its population was 195 (down from 237 at the 2010 census).

The community takes its name from nearby Big Creek.
