= Alexander and Rich Mountain Railway =

Former railway in West Virginia

The Alexander and Rich Mountain Railway was a railway in West Virginia.

== History ==
The Alexander and Rich Mountain Railroad was sold by receivers November 27, 1899, and new company was formed December 29, 1899 as the Alexander and Rich Mountain Railway. The track was from Alexander, WV, to Switchback, WV 16 miles, Star to Right Fork 5 miles, and Morgan to Phillips Run, WV, 1 mile.

In 1901 the branch from Morgan to Phillips Run was abandoned. In 1903 H.T. Wilson was appointed receiver for the company and the Randolph Lumber and Coal Company with the court appointing F. T. Reese later that year.

In 1905 the railroad was 16 miles (26 km) long, operated for freight only with connection to Baltimore and Ohio Railroad at Alexander, WV. C.H. Williams was listed as the 1st Vice President and General Manager.

December 1906, the company was again reorganized, this time becoming the Alexander and Eastern Railroad owned by the Croft Lumber Company.

== Rolling stock and physical plant ==
- 1900, gauge: 4 feet 8.5 inches, rail: 35 and 56 pound steel, 3 locomotives, 21 flat freight cars
- 1902, gauge 4 feet 8.5 inches, rail: 35 and 56 pound steel, 1 locomotive, 21 flat freight cars

== Connections ==
Connections existed to Baltimore & Ohio at Alexander, West Virginia

== Board (1900) ==
- J.J. Holloway, Wheeling, WV, President
- D.C. List Jr., Wheeling, WV
- J.B. Hart, Clarksburg, WV, Vice President
- C. M. Hart, Clarksburg, WV, Secretary/Treasurer
- H.T. Wilson, Clarksburg, WV, General Manager

== General Offices ==
The General Offices were in Clarksburg, WV
