= West Virginia Midland Railroad =

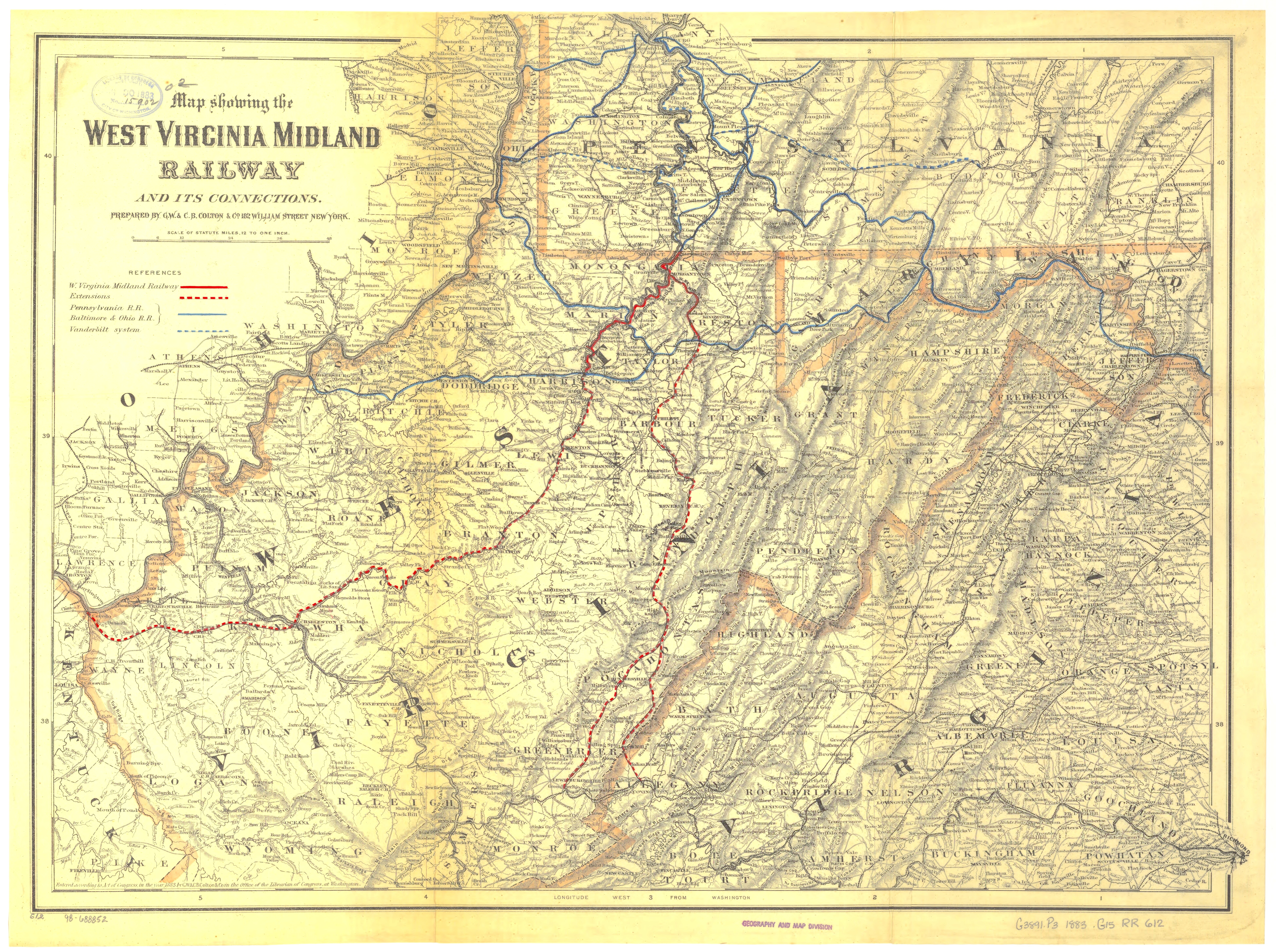
- Map of the railroad (railroad in red, other lines in blue)

Overview
- Locale: West Virginia

The West Virginia Midland Railroad was a railroad in West Virginia chartered in 1905 with an initial capital of $500,000. Executives planned to build a railroad from Sutton on the B&O Railroad southwest via Webster Springs to Marlington, a distance of about fifty miles (80 km). Incorporators were Col. John T. McGraw of Grafton, former Congressman C. P. Dorr, J.E. Woddell of Webster Springs, G. A. Hechner of Palmer, and C. D. Elliott of Parkersburg.
