= Eden Park, West Virginia =

Unincorporated community in West Virginia, United States

- Unincorporated community
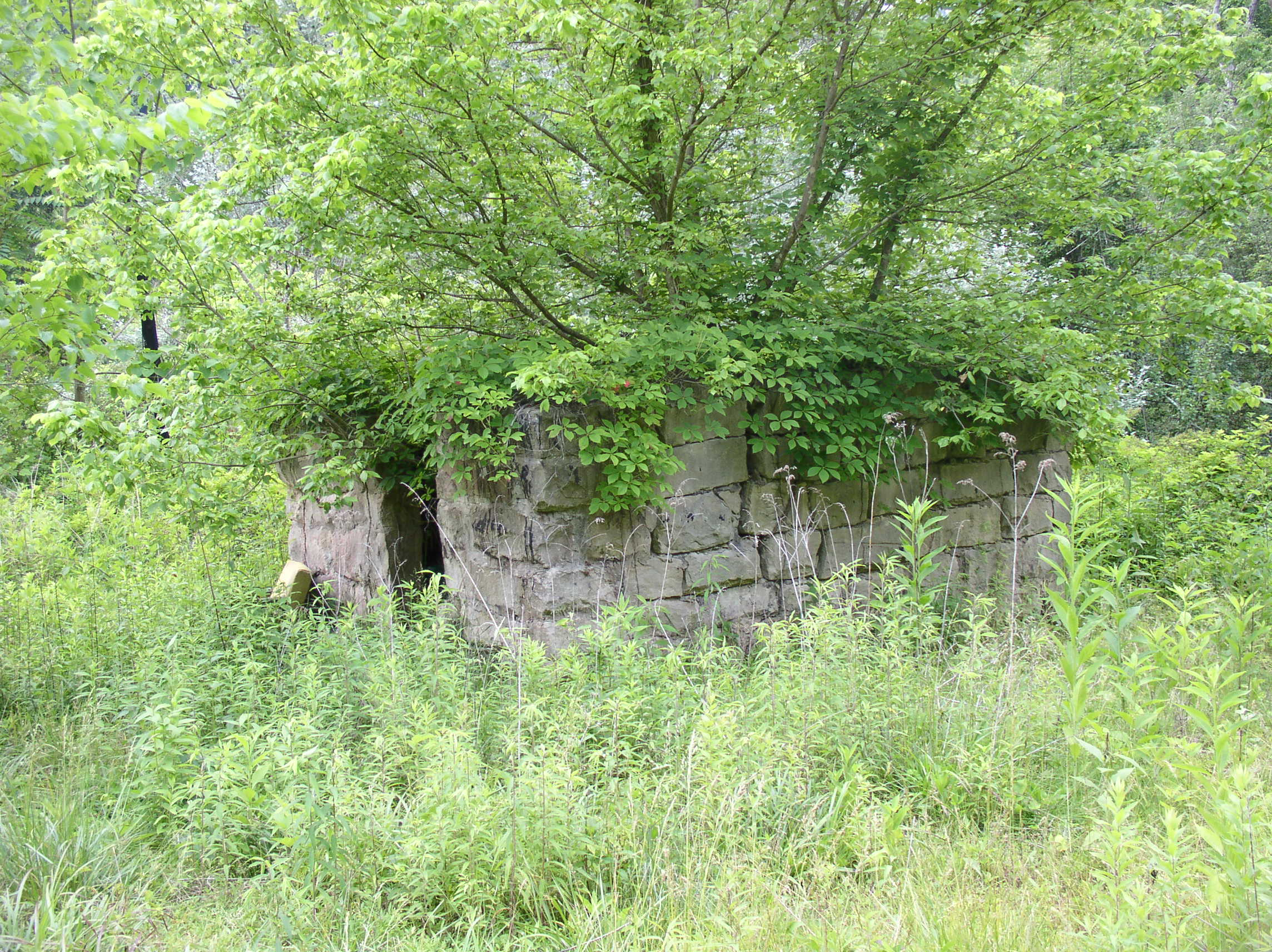
- Eden Park, 2007 Eden Park, 2007

- Location within West Virginia Location within the United States
- Coordinates: 38°3′30″N 82°8′45″W
- Country: United States
- State: West Virginia
- County: Lincoln
- Elevation: 630 ft (190 m)
- Time zone: UTC-5 (Eastern (EST))
  - Summer (DST): UTC-4 (EDT)
- GNIS feature ID: 1741615

Eden Park is a former coal town situated along the Guyandotte River between Atenville and Harts in Lincoln County, West Virginia, United States. It appears in state business directories as early as 1908.

== History ==
=== Captain Farley's Raid ===
Captain Henry Farley, a veteran of the Revolutionary War and resident of Montgomery County, Virginia, was the first known Anglo visitor to present-day Gill. In June 1792, Captain Farley passed through the area while pursuing a Native American war party that had raided Virginia settlements at Bluestone River. By the time he reached what is today Gill, he and his group had already engaged the retreating natives in the headwaters of Coal River and in the Guyandotte River valley some two miles below what is today Logan. Farley pursued the natives to the mouth of the Guyandotte River before returning home.

=== Eden Park Coal Company ===
Eden Park Coal Company, founded on August 24, 1922, established its headquarters in Atenville. Incorporators were Philip Hager of Hamlin (50 shares), John D. Shelton of Sand Creek (50 shares), Shelby Shelton of Sand Creek (50 shares), Dr. D.P. Crockett of Big Creek (45 shares), and Mrs. D.P. Crockett of Huntington (5 shares). This company created Eden Park, a company town, in order to provide housing for miners. It was a short-lived venture. The company, and the town, died when local Green Porter stabbed and killed J.X. Hill, the mine owner or boss, over a disputed poker game.

=== Recent History ===
Today, only a few ruined structures remain in Eden Park. The mine remains closed. A small unkempt cemetery is located in the old community.
