= Atenville, West Virginia =

Unincorporated community in West Virginia, United States

- Unincorporated community
- Location within West Virginia Location within the United States
- Coordinates: 38°2′53″N 82°8′34″W
- Country: United States
- State: West Virginia
- County: Lincoln
- Elevation: 617 ft (188 m)
- Time zone: UTC-5 (Eastern (EST))
  - Summer (DST): UTC-4 (EDT)
- GNIS feature ID: 1535068

Atenville is an unincorporated community in Lincoln County, West Virginia, United States. It is a residential community located in Harts Creek District and is part of the Harts census-designated place.

== Geography ==
Atenville is situated at the mouth of Little Harts Creek and includes some territory on the opposite side of the Guyandotte River. Dry Branch is also part of Atenville.

== History ==
=== Captain Farley's Raid ===
Captain Henry Farley, a veteran of the Revolutionary War and resident of Montgomery County, Virginia, was the first known Anglo visitor to present-day Atenville. In June 1792, Captain Farley passed through the area while pursuing a Native American war party that had raided Virginia settlements at Bluestone River. By the time he reached what is today Atenville, he and his group had already engaged the retreating natives in the headwaters of Coal River and in the Guyandotte River valley some two miles below what is today Logan. Farley pursued the natives to the mouth of the Guyandotte River before returning home.

According to the F.B. Lambert Papers at Marshall University, Stephen Hart's father was killed by Native Americans at the mouth of Little Harts Creek. Big and Little Harts creeks are named for Hart's family. This incident, if true, would have happened prior to 1795.

=== Twentieth Century ===
Atenville is named for a Mr. Aten, an employee of the C&O Railroad. Atenville had a post office from 1906 to 1918 and from 1922 to 1926. The following persons have served as postmaster: George W. Dillon (1906–1908), William M. Workman (1908–1914), Nancy Payne (1914–1915), Arnold Perry (1915–1918), Kile Topping (1922–1923), and Wilson B. Lambert (1923–1926). The post office was discontinued on February 27, 1926.

== Education ==
For many years, Atenville was home to Atenville Grade School. The original school was situated on the east side of the Guyandotte River.

== Churches ==
Presently, the Mt. Calvary Freewill Baptist Church and Little Harts Freewill Baptist Church are located in Atenville.

== Transportation ==
Atenville is accessed by Route 10. CSX Railroad is located across the river.

== Business ==
Fern Pack operated a small store at Dry Branch.
