= Augusta, Edgefield and Newberry Railroad =

The Augusta, Edgefield and Newberry Railroad was the new name given the Augusta and Edgefield Railroad in South Carolina, United States, in December 1885.

The company was chartered to serve the western region of South Carolina.

In 1887, the Augusta, Edgefield and Newberry was consolidated with the Atlantic and Northwestern Railroad to form the Georgia and Carolina Midland Railroad.
