= List of tunnels in the United States =

The following is a list of some tunnels in the United States of America. More tunnels may be found in each state than are included on this list.

== Alabama ==
- 5th Avenue North Tunnel, Birmingham. Completed in 1909, this road tunnel runs beneath the former Birmingham Terminal Station site, now occupied by the Red Mountain Expressway.
- John H. Bankhead Tunnel, a 3,389-foot-long (1,033 m) road tunnel, US 98 under the Mobile River in Mobile.
- Blount Tunnel, a rail tunnel near Blount Springs.
- Brocks Gap Tunnel, a 900-foot-long (270 m) CSX rail tunnel in Hoover near Birmingham, under Shades Mountain.
- Cooks Springs Tunnel, a Norfolk Southern rail tunnel near Cooks Springs, on the main line between Birmingham and Anniston.
- Coosa Tunnel a rail tunnel on an active Norfolk Southern line. In Shelby County.
- Hardwick Tunnel, a rail tunnel on the ATN Railway near Wattsville.
- Hayden Tunnel, an active rail tunnel located near Hayden.
- Jefferson Tunnel, abandoned rail tunnel in Jefferson County.
- Laney Tunnel, an active rail tunnel on the ATN Railway near Glencoe. Completed in 1851 and reinforced in 2010.
- Oak Mountain Tunnel a rail tunnel on an active Norfolk Southern rail line. In Shelby County.
- Palisade Tunnel, a 400-foot-long (120 m) road tunnel on the Homewood side of Red Mountain. The one-way tunnel provides west-bound access to Palisades Boulevard from Oxmoor Road.
- Red Mountain Tunnel, a proposed road tunnel project that was meant to link Birmingham to its southern neighbors. The tunnel idea was abandoned and eventually the Red Mountain Expressway Cut was built instead.
- Roper Tunnel, a rail tunnel on the ATN Railway near Trussville.
- Tunnel Springs Tunnel, an 840-foot-long (260 m) abandoned rail tunnel near Tunnel Springs. The masonry tunnel was completed in 1899 and abandoned in 1994.
- George C. Wallace Tunnel, twin road tunnels, 3,000-foot-long (910 m) road tunnels, I-10 under the Mobile River in Mobile.
- Waldo Tunnel, Former ACL tunnel on the CSX Lineville Sub.
- Weathers Tunnel, a rail tunnel on the CSX near Weathers.

== Alaska ==
- Anton Anderson Memorial Tunnel, 13,300 feet (4,100 m), rail (Alaska Railroad) and highway (Portage Glacier Road), near Whittier
- Portage Lake Tunnel, automobile, Portage Glacier Road, near Whittier

== Arizona ==
- Claypool Tunnel, abandoned highway tunnel next to US 60, just east of Superior (replaced by the adjacent Queen Creek Tunnel)
- Poland Tunnel, abandoned pedestrian tunnel between the ghost towns of Poland and Walker, south of Prescott
- Mule Pass Tunnel, 1,400-ft long, road SR 80, Bisbee, Arizona
- Deck Park Tunnel, 2,887-ft twin road tunnels, Interstate 10, Phoenix
- Queen Creek Tunnel, 1,200-ft road US 60, just east of Superior
- Verde Canyon Railroad Tunnel, 680-foot-long (210 m) railway tunnel, Yavapai County

== Arkansas ==
- Bobby Hopper Tunnel, twin tunnels, Interstate 49, Washington County
- Cotter Tunnel, rail tunnel under US 62, MNA Railroad, northwest of Cotter, Marion County
- Crest Tunnel, rail tunnel under State Highway 14, MNA Railroad, northwest of Omaha, Boone County
- Cricket Tunnel, rail tunnel under old U.S. Route 65, MNA Railroad, south of Omaha, Boone County
- Pyatt Tunnel, rail tunnel under County Road 408, MNA Railroad, southeast of Pyatt, Marion County

== Colorado ==
- Alameda Parkway, short tunnel on the access road to the Upper North parking lot at Red Rocks Amphitheater
- Alpine Tunnel, abandoned rail tunnel, 1,772 feet (540 m), Denver, South Park and Pacific Railroad, northeast of Pitkin, under the Continental Divide
- Boulder Canyon Tunnel, Colorado State Highway 119 west of Boulder
- Clear Creek Canyon tunnels (six, including one abandoned), US 6 west of Golden
- Colorado National Monument west of Grand Junction
  - Rim Rock Drive (two tunnels)
  - Tunnel on Glade Park Road near Culvert Arch
- Crystal Wall Tunnel, Colorado State Highway 14 west of Fort Collins
- Busk-Ivanhoe Tunnel, abandoned rail tunnel, Colorado Midland Railway, now part of an aqueduct, under the Continental Divide near Hagerman Pass
- Hagerman Tunnel, abandoned rail tunnel, Colorado Midland Railway, under the Continental Divide near Hagerman Pass
- Interstate 70 / US Route 6 (listed west to east):
  - Beavertail Mountain Tunnel, twin tunnels, milepost 50 east of Palisade
  - No Name Tunnel, twin tunnels, Glenwood Canyon project, milepost 118 east of Glenwood Springs
  - Hanging Lake Tunnel, twin tunnels, Glenwood Canyon project, milepost 125 east of Glenwood Springs
  - Reverse Curve Tunnel, westbound only, Glenwood Canyon project, milepost 127 east of Glenwood Springs
  - Eisenhower-Johnson Memorial Tunnel, twin tunnels under the Continental Divide, mileposts 213-216 near Loveland Pass northeast of Dillon
  - Veterans Memorial Tunnels, twin tunnels, milepost 242 east of Idaho Springs
- Mesa Verde National Park, Mesa Top Ruins Road between mileposts 4 and 5, 0.28 miles long
- Midland Tunnels (four), on County Road 371 north of Buena Vista
- Million Dollar Highway (US 550)
  - Ouray Tunnel, 2.6 miles south of Ouray
  - Snow shed at Curran Gulch, 5.3 miles south of Ouray
- Moffat Tunnel, rail tunnel, Union Pacific Railroad (formerly Denver and Salt Lake Railway), under the Continental Divide near Rollins Pass ; also a water tunnel
- Wolf Creek Pass Tunnel, US 160 between South Fork and Pagosa Springs

== Connecticut ==
- Heroes Tunnel, twin tunnels, Wilbur Cross Parkway/State Route 15, West Rock Ridge State Park, in New Haven
- Pequabuck Tunnel, rail tunnel, originally Hartford, Providence and Fishkill Railroad, Plymouth
- Pitkin Street Tunnel, road tunnel between Elm and State streets, downtown New Haven
- Shepaug, Litchfield and Northern Railroad, abandoned 235-foot-long (72 m) rail tunnel in Washington, now a rail trail
- Taft Tunnel, rail tunnel, Providence and Worcester Railroad (originally part of Norwich and Worcester Railroad), 300 feet (91 m), in Lisbon (oldest active railroad tunnel in the United States)

== District of Columbia ==
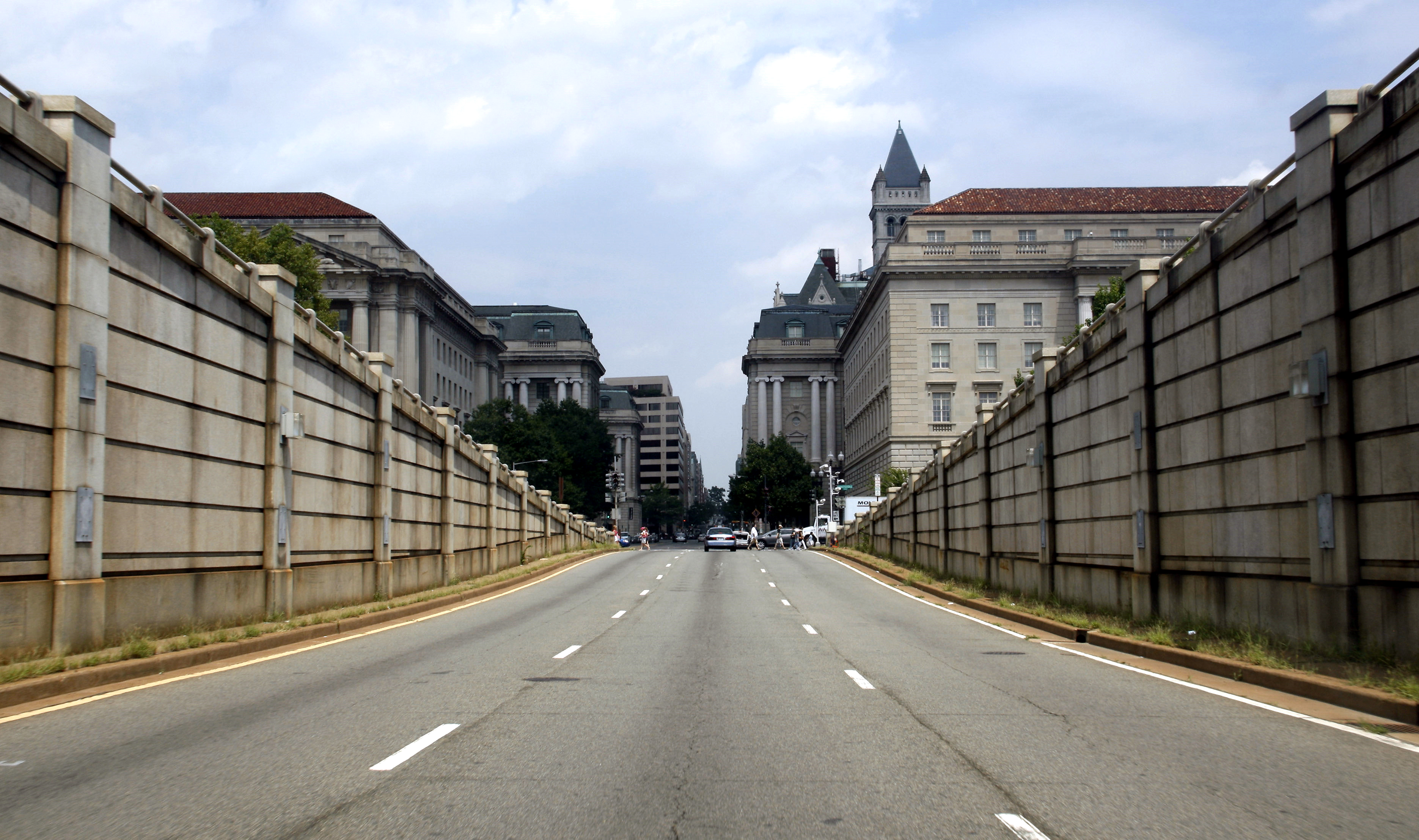
12th Street Tunnel, under the National Mall

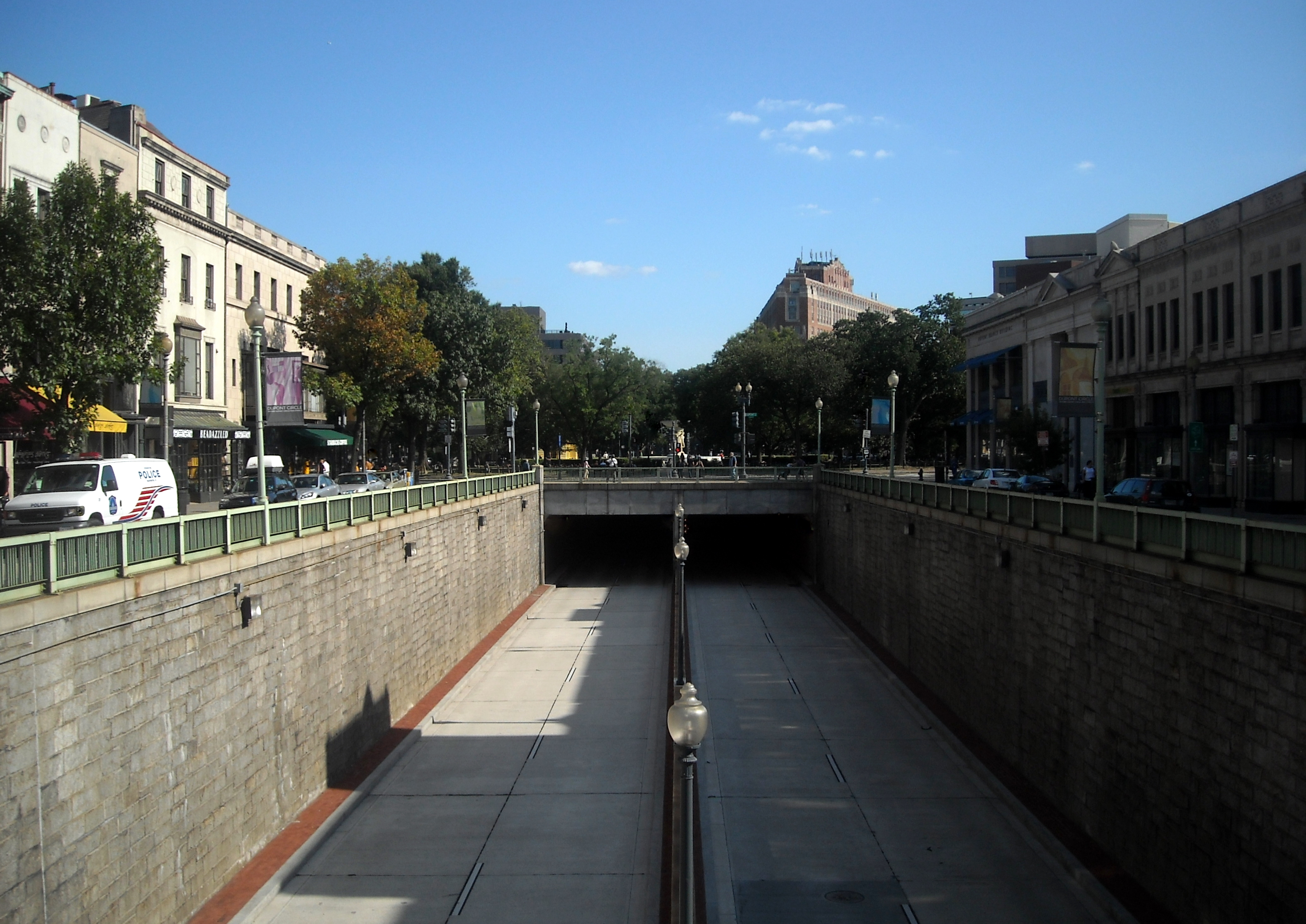
Connecticut Avenue tunnel, under Dupont Circle

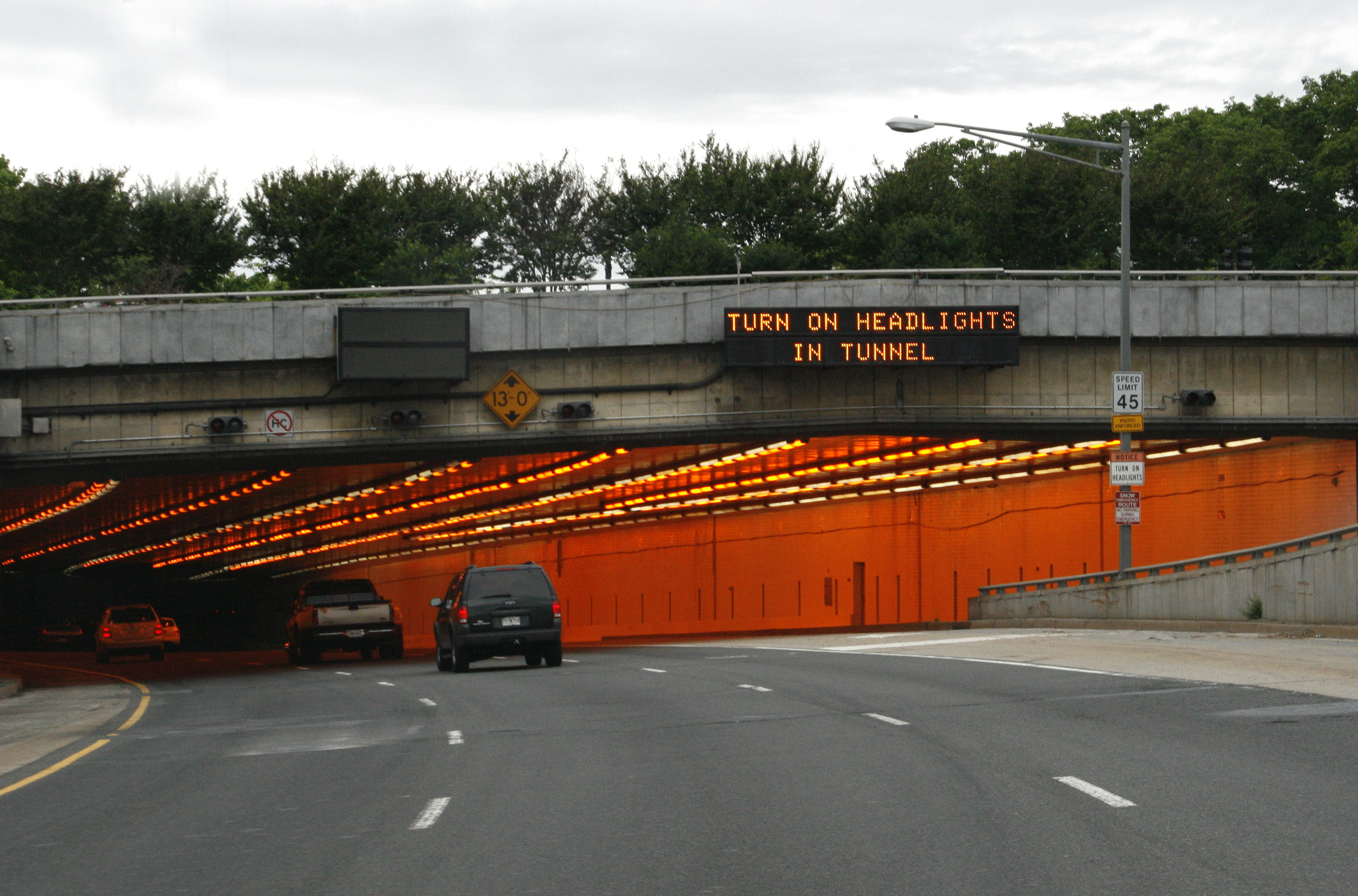
Third Street Tunnel, under the National Mall

- 9th Street Tunnel, under the National Mall (one-way southbound from Constitution Avenue NW to I-395), NW to SW DC
- 12th Street Tunnel, under the National Mall (one-way northbound from I-395 and Independence Avenue SW to Constitution Avenue NW), SW to NW DC
- 16th Street NW tunnel, twin tunnels, under Scott Circle NW, NW DC
- Barney Circle tunnel, twin tunnels, Southeast Boulevard SE under Barney Circle SE. Also a third tunnel, the ramp from the northbound John Philip Sousa Bridge to westbound Southeast Boulevard SE. Part of Southeast Freeway (Interstate 695). SE DC
- (four) Chesapeake and Ohio Canal National Historical Park road culverts under the Canal:
  - # 1 (mile 1.3), near Canal Road NW and Foxhall Road NW, NW DC
  - # 2 (mile 3.1), Abner Cloud house (a.k.a. Fletcher's Boat House), Canal Road NW south of Arizona Avenue NW, NW DC
  - (# 3 and # 4 are in Maryland)
- Connecticut Avenue NW tunnel, twin tunnels, under Dupont Circle NW, NW DC
- E Street Expressway NW tunnel under Virginia Avenue NW, NW DC
- First Street Tunnel, twin (two tracks) rail tunnel, Amtrak south from Washington, under First Street NE and First SE on Capitol Hill, NE and SE DC
- K Street NW tunnel, twin tunnels, under Washington Circle NW, NW DC
- Massachusetts Avenue NW tunnel, twin tunnels, under Thomas Circle NW, NW DC
- (two) Third Street Tunnels, Interstate 395
  - southern portion, twin tunnels, under the National Mall Capitol reflecting pool, SW and NW DC
  - northern portion, twin tunnels, under Massachusetts Ave NW and H Street NW, NW DC
- Virginia Avenue Tunnel, rail tunnel, former Baltimore and Potomac Railroad tunnel now used by CSX RF&P Subdivision, under Virginia Avenue SE, SE DC
- West Leg of Inner Loop (Interstate 66) tunnel under Juárez Circle NW (intersection of New Hampshire Avenue NW, Virginia Avenue NW, and 25th Street NW), NW DC
- Beach Drive tunnel

== Florida ==
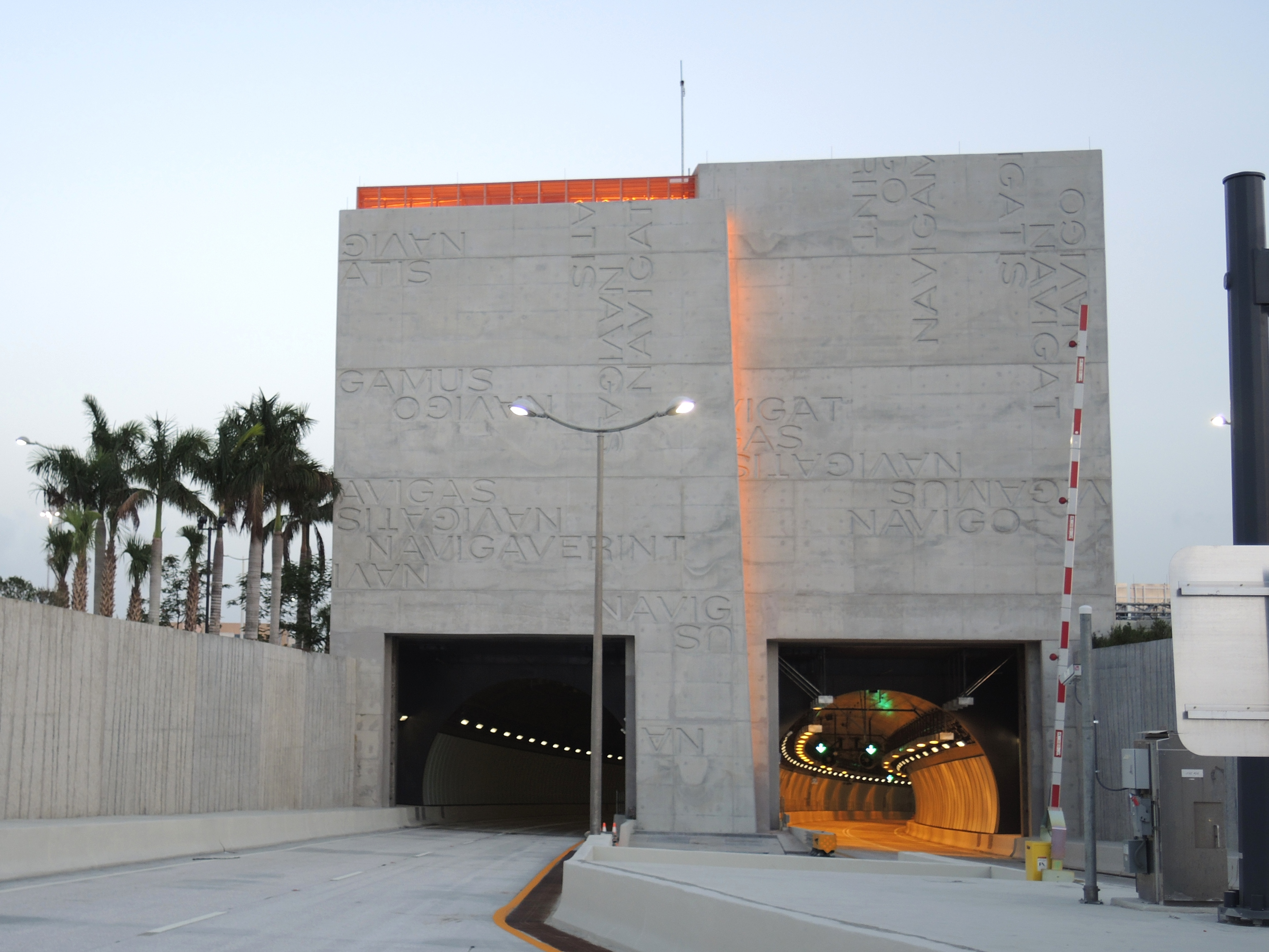
Port of Miami Tunnel

- Henry E. Kinney Tunnel/New River Tunnel, twin tunnels, US 1 under New River in Fort Lauderdale
- Port of Miami Tunnel, twin tunnels, State Road 886, beneath Biscayne Bay, connecting MacArthur Causeway on Watson Island with PortMiami on Dodge Island

== Georgia ==
- Brushy Mountain Tunnel (first named Divide Tunnel) on the Silver Comet Trail, which is the former Right-of-Way of Seaboard System rail line. Brushy Mountain Road runs perpendicular and above the tunnel. Located south of Braswell, Georgia and also about 6 miles east of Rockmart, Georgia.
- (two) Chetoogeta Mountain Tunnels, rail tunnels just east of Tunnel Hill, Georgia
  - active CSX Transportation rail tunnel
  - abandoned Western & Atlantic Railroad rail tunnel, now a rail trail and historic site
- Krog Street Tunnel, in Atlanta

Windy Hill ramp tunnel Exit ramp from I-75 north to Windy Hill Rd. Smyrna GA

== Hawaii ==
- Hospital Rock Tunnels, twin tunnels, Interstate H-3, Oahu
- John H. Wilson Tunnels, twin tunnels, State Route 63/Likelike Highway between Kaneohe and Honolulu, Oahu, goes under the Koʻolau Range
- (two) Nu‘uanu Pali Tunnels, each twin tunnels, State Route 61/Pali Highway between Kailua and Honolulu, Oahu; Image:Pali Tunnels.jpg
- Tetsuo Harano Tunnels, twin tunnels, Interstate H-3, Oahu
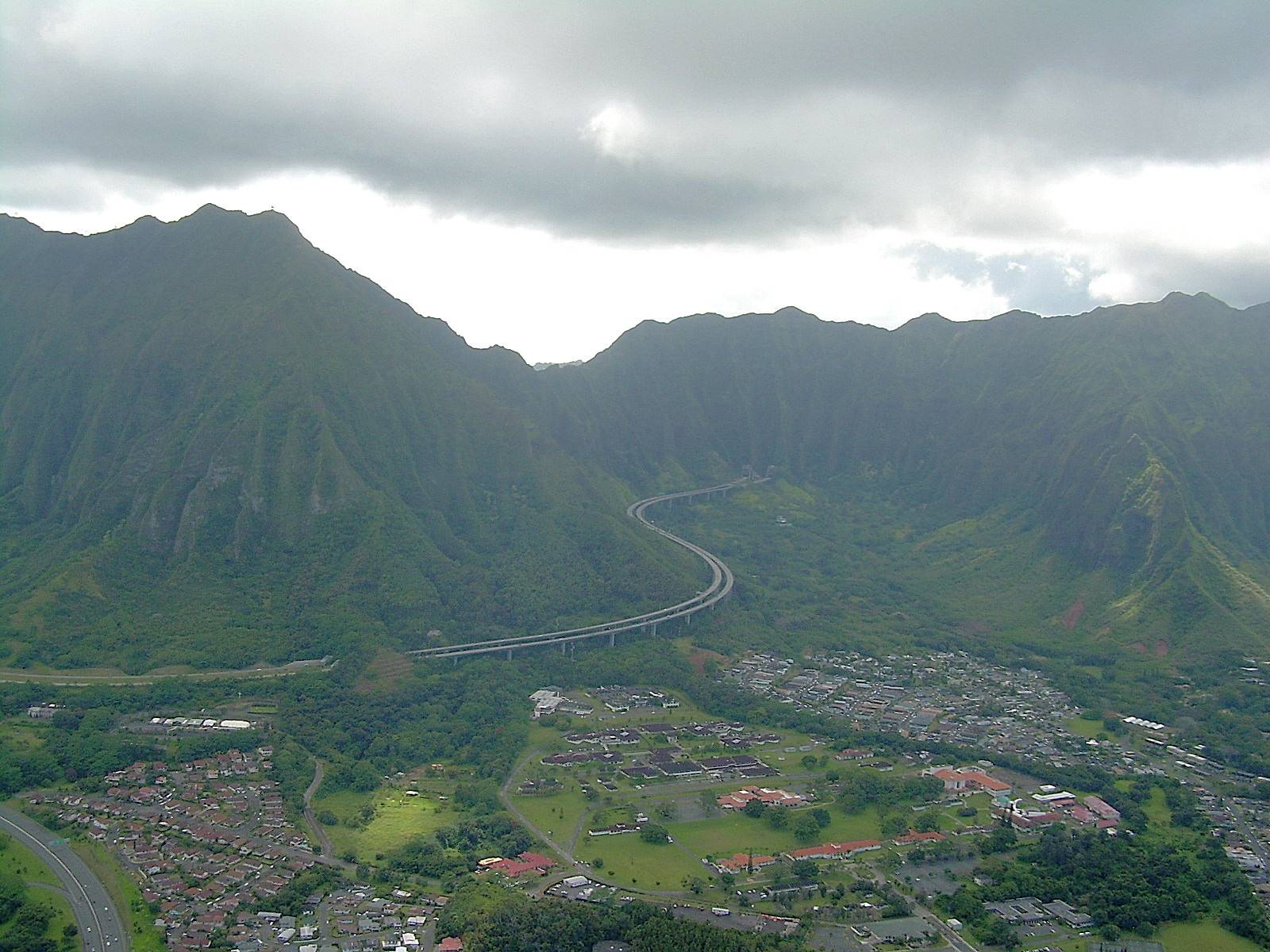
  Section of Interstate H-3 with the Tetsuo Harano Tunnels

== Idaho ==
- St. Paul Pass Tunnel/Taft Tunnel, abandoned rail tunnel, in use 1908–1980, Chicago, Milwaukee, St. Paul & Pacific Railroad Tunnel Number 20, between Shoshone County, Idaho and Mineral County, Montana, now part of Milwaukee Road Rail Trail, 47°23′25″N 115°38′55″W, el. 5,141 feet (1,567 m)

== Illinois ==
- Chicago Freight Subway, 60-mile-long (97 km) rail tunnel system under the Chicago Loop, mostly abandoned
- LaSalle Street Tunnel, streetcar tunnel, LaSalle Street under the Chicago River in Chicago, abandoned
- Milwaukee-Dearborn Subway, rail transit tunnel, 1951, 3.85 miles (6.20 km) long, CTA 'L' Blue Line under Milwaukee Avenue and Dearborn Street in Chicago
- State Street Subway, rail transit tunnel, 1943, 4.9 miles (7.9 km) long, CTA 'L' Red Line under State Street in Chicago
- Tunnel Hill State Trail tunnel, abandoned rail tunnel, 543-foot-long (166 m) former Cairo and Vincennes Railroad tunnel now part of Tunnel Hill State Trail, used as a hiking and bike rail trail, between Tunnel Hill and Vienna in Johnson County
- Van Buren Street Tunnel, streetcar tunnel, Van Buren Street under the Chicago River in Chicago, abandoned
- Washington Street Tunnel, streetcar tunnel, Washington Street under the Chicago River in Chicago, abandoned
- Winston Tunnel, abandoned rail tunnel, 2,493 feet (760 m) long, abandoned and partially collapsed former Chicago Great Western Railway tunnel, 9 miles west of Elizabeth in Jo Daviess County
- East Dubuque rail tunnel, coming off Mississippi River Illinois Central RR Bridge in East Dubuque. Still in use. The 851 foot tunnel makes a 90° turn.

== Indiana ==
- Burton Tunnel, rail tunnel, 1907, 2,217 feet (676 m) long, French Lick Scenic Railway (historical railroad), west of French Lick and northwest of the French Lick Municipal Airport in Orange County
- Duncan Tunnel/Edwardsville Tunnel, rail tunnel, 1881, 4,295 feet (1,309 m) long (longest in the state), , Norfolk Southern Railway under Edwardsville Hill (part of The Knobs), including portion of Interchange 118 on I-64, near Edwardsville in Floyd County
- Indian Springs Tunnel/Crane Tunnel, rail tunnel, 1890, 1,106 feet (337 m) long, Indiana Rail Road (INRD), under County Road 161 within the grounds of the Crane Naval Surface Warfare Center, northwest of Indian Springs in Martin County
- Marengo Tunnel/Corndra Tunnel, rail tunnel, 1882, 700 feet (210 m) long, Norfolk Southern Railway, under Cornelison Ln and Goodman Ridge Rd between Temple and Marengo in Crawford County
- Marine Drive Tunnel, rail tunnel, 233 feet (71 m) long, single-lane tunnel runs beneath a railroad trellis, roughly connecting Madison Avenue and 29th Street on the south side Anderson, Indiana in Madison County
- Patton Tunnel/Taswell Tunnel, rail tunnel, 769 feet (234 m) long, Norfolk Southern Railway, under Tunnel Hill Road between Taswell and English in Crawford County
- Ritner Tunnel/The Big Tunnel, rail tunnel, 1857, 1,731 feet (528 m) long, CSX railroad under Tunnel Hill, along the East Fork of the White River, east of Tunnelton and west-southwest of Fort Ritner in Lawrence County
- Willow Valley Tunnel, rail tunnel, 1900, 1,160 feet (350 m) long, CSX railroad, under State Road 650 south of Willow Valley in Martin County

== Iowa ==
- Harmon Tunnel, road tunnel under Backbone Ridge, built as a millrace, 1858, widened for road use, 1925, 149.9 feet (45.7 m) long, Pammel State Park, Madison County, Iowa, 4.1 miles (6.6 km) southwest of Winterset, Iowa

== Kentucky ==
- Boone Tunnel (abandoned), adjacent to US 68 / KY 33 west of Wilmore
- Burnside Tunnel (abandoned and partially submerged), Burnside, on the former US-27 alignment, now partially submerged by Lake Cumberland after construction of the Wolf Creek Dam.
- Cochran Hill Tunnel, twin tunnels, (I-64), carrying two lanes of traffic in each direction for I-64 under a section of Cherokee Park in Louisville between the exits at Grinstead Drive and Cannons Lane
- Cumberland Gap Tunnel, twin tunnels, US 25E, under Cumberland Gap National Historical Park, between Middlesboro, Kentucky and Harrogate, Tennessee.
- Grant's Bend Tunnels, twin rail tunnels, CSX Transportation CC Subdivision in Ryland Heights, Kentucky.
- Nada Tunnel, KY 77, Powell County, near Red River Gorge Park, built for logging.
- Leatherwood Tunnel, twin tunnels, at Leatherwood in Perry County on KY 699.
- Louisville East End Tunnel, I-265 (also KY 841), twin tunnels carrying two lanes of traffic in each direction for I-265 under a historic property between the Lewis and Clark Bridge and US 42 in Harrods Creek, a Louisville suburban neighborhood.

== Louisiana ==
- Belle Chasse Tunnel, LA 23 under the Gulf Intracoastal Waterway, southeast bound only, Belle Chasse (near New Orleans)
- Harvey Tunnel, twin tunnels, Business U.S. 90 frontage roads, under the Gulf Intracoastal Waterway, Harvey (near New Orleans)
- Houma Tunnel, (LA 3040) a two-lane tunnel crossing under the Gulf Intracoastal Waterway in Houma

== Maryland ==
- (three) Baltimore and Potomac Tunnels (B&P Tunnel), twin-track rail tunnels, Amtrak (formerly Pennsylvania Railroad), Baltimore
  - Gilmor Street Tunnel
  - Wilson Street Tunnel
  - John Street Tunnel
- Baltimore Harbor Tunnel, twin tunnels, Interstate 895 under Patapsco River, Baltimore
- Borden Tunnel, abandoned rail tunnel, 1911, 957 feet long, Western Maryland Railway north of Frostburg, now part of Great Allegheny Passage rail trail
- Brush Tunnel, active tourist rail tunnel and rail trail, 1911, Western Maryland Scenic Railroad (formerly Western Maryland Railway), west of Corriganville, also now part of Great Allegheny Passage rail trail
- Dalecarlia Tunnel, abandoned rail tunnel, 1910, CSX (formerly Baltimore and Ohio Railroad), underneath MacArthur Boulevard and the Washington Aqueduct in Brookmont, now part of Capital Crescent Trail rail trail
- Fort McHenry Tunnel, quad tunnels, Interstate 95 under Baltimore Harbor, Baltimore
- Henryton Tunnel, rail tunnel, c. 1850, CSX (formerly Baltimore and Ohio Railroad), west of Marriottsville
- Howard Street Tunnel, rail tunnel, c.1895, CSX (formerly Baltimore and Ohio Railroad), Baltimore
- Ilchester Tunnel, rail tunnel, c. 1903, CSX (formerly Baltimore and Ohio Railroad), east of Ellicott City
- Jones Falls Conduit, water tunnel, built in 1914 to contain Jones Falls (river), from North Howard Street to East Baltimore Street, paralleling Jones Falls Expressway, in Baltimore
- Paw Paw Tunnel, abandoned canal tunnel, in use 1850–1924, 3,118 feet (950 m), Chesapeake and Ohio Canal, Allegany County, Maryland, across the Potomac River from Paw Paw, West Virginia, now a rail trail; through same ridge as Kessler Tunnel (Western Maryland Railway) and Graham Tunnel (CSX)
- Plymouth Tunnel, a 1,020-foot (310 m) light-rail tunnel between Plymouth Street and Arliss Street in Silver Spring, Maryland, constructed as part of the Purple Line.
- Randolph Road Tunnel, a 265-foot (81 m) road tunnel, built in 2018, under MD 97 (Georgia Ave) in Glenmont, Maryland
- Winters Run Tunnel, a 600-foot (180 m) road tunnel, carrying MD 200 under Olde Mill Run in Rockville, Maryland
- Union Tunnel, twin rail tunnels, Amtrak (formerly Pennsylvania Railroad), under Hoffman Street between Greenmount Avenue and Bond Street, Baltimore
- (three) Western Maryland Railway tunnels, abandoned rail tunnels, in use 1906–1975, Western Maryland Railway ; from east to west:
  - Indigo Tunnel, abandoned rail tunnel, in use c. 1906–1975, northeast of Little Orleans
  - Stickpile Tunnel, abandoned rail tunnel, in use 1906–1975, Green Ridge State Forest in Allegany County, between Little Orleans, Maryland and Paw Paw, West Virginia
  - Kessler Tunnel, abandoned rail tunnel, in use 1906–1975, Green Ridge State Forest in Allegany County, northeast of Paw Paw, West Virginia; through same ridge as Graham Tunnel (CSX) and Paw Paw Tunnel (Chesapeake and Ohio Canal)

== Massachusetts ==
- Road tunnels connected to the Big Dig project in Boston:
  - Callahan Tunnel/Sumner Tunnel, twin tunnels, State Route 1A, under Boston Harbor
    - Callahan Tunnel, State Route 1A northeast-bound only, under Boston Harbor
    - Sumner Tunnel, State Route 1A southwest-bound only, under Boston Harbor
  - Fort Point Tunnel, twin tunnels, Massachusetts Turnpike/I-90 under Fort Point Channel, Boston
  - Ted Williams Tunnel, twin tunnels, Massachusetts Turnpike/I-90 under Boston Harbor
  - Thomas P. O'Neill Jr. Tunnel, twin tunnels, 2003, I-93 (in coordination with the Dewey Square Tunnel), Boston
    - Dewey Square Tunnel, southbound I-93, southbound portion of the Thomas P. O'Neill Jr. Tunnel, Boston
- Massachusetts Bay Transportation Authority tunnels in the Greater Boston area:
  - MBTA Blue Line rail tunnel:
    - East Boston Tunnel, rail tunnel, between Airport Station and Bowdoin, now part of the MBTA Blue Line
  - MBTA Green Line rail tunnel:
    - Tremont Street Subway, rail tunnel, between Science Park and Boylston, now part of the MBTA Green Line
  - MBTA Orange Line rail tunnels, north to south:
    - Haymarket North extension, partially tunneled rail line, between Community College and Haymarket, MBTA Orange Line
    - Washington Street Tunnel, rail tunnel, between Haymarket and Chinatown, now the core of the MBTA Orange Line
    - Southwest Corridor extension, partially tunneled rail line, between Chinatown and Mass Ave, MBTA Orange Line
  - MBTA Red Line rail tunnels, north to south:
    - Cambridge tunnel, rail tunnel, between Alewife and Longfellow Bridge, now part of the MBTA Red Line
    - Dorchester Tunnel, rail tunnel, between Longfellow Bridge and JFK/UMass, now part of the MBTA Red Line
  - MBTA road tunnels, north to south:
    - Harvard Bus Tunnel, connects Harvard MBTA station under Harvard Square in Cambridge
    - MBTA Silver Line, bus tunnel, between South Station and Silver Line Way under Fort Point Channel
- Hoosac Tunnel, rail tunnel, 1875, 4.75 miles (7.64 km) long, Pan Am Railways (formerly Boston and Maine Railroad), through the Berkshire Mountains between North Adams and Florida, Massachusetts
  - The longest active transportation tunnel in North America east of the Rocky Mountains
- Prudential Center Complex tunnel, twin road tunnels and one rail tunnel, Massachusetts Turnpike/I-90 under Prudential Center Complex, Boston

== Michigan ==
- Detroit-Windsor Tunnel, road tunnel, Detroit to Windsor, Ontario, Canada under the Detroit River
- Michigan Central Railway Tunnel, twin rail tunnels, Canadian Pacific Railway (formerly Michigan Central Railway), Detroit to Windsor, Ontario, Canada under the Detroit River
- (two) St. Clair Tunnels, rail tunnels, Port Huron to Sarnia, Ontario, Canada under the St. Clair River
  - original tunnel, 1891, abandoned and sealed c. 1994
  - current tunnel, c.1994, Canadian National Railway
- South Washington Avenue Tunnel, twin road tunnels, in Holland, under runway 8/26 at West Michigan Regional Airport

== Minnesota ==
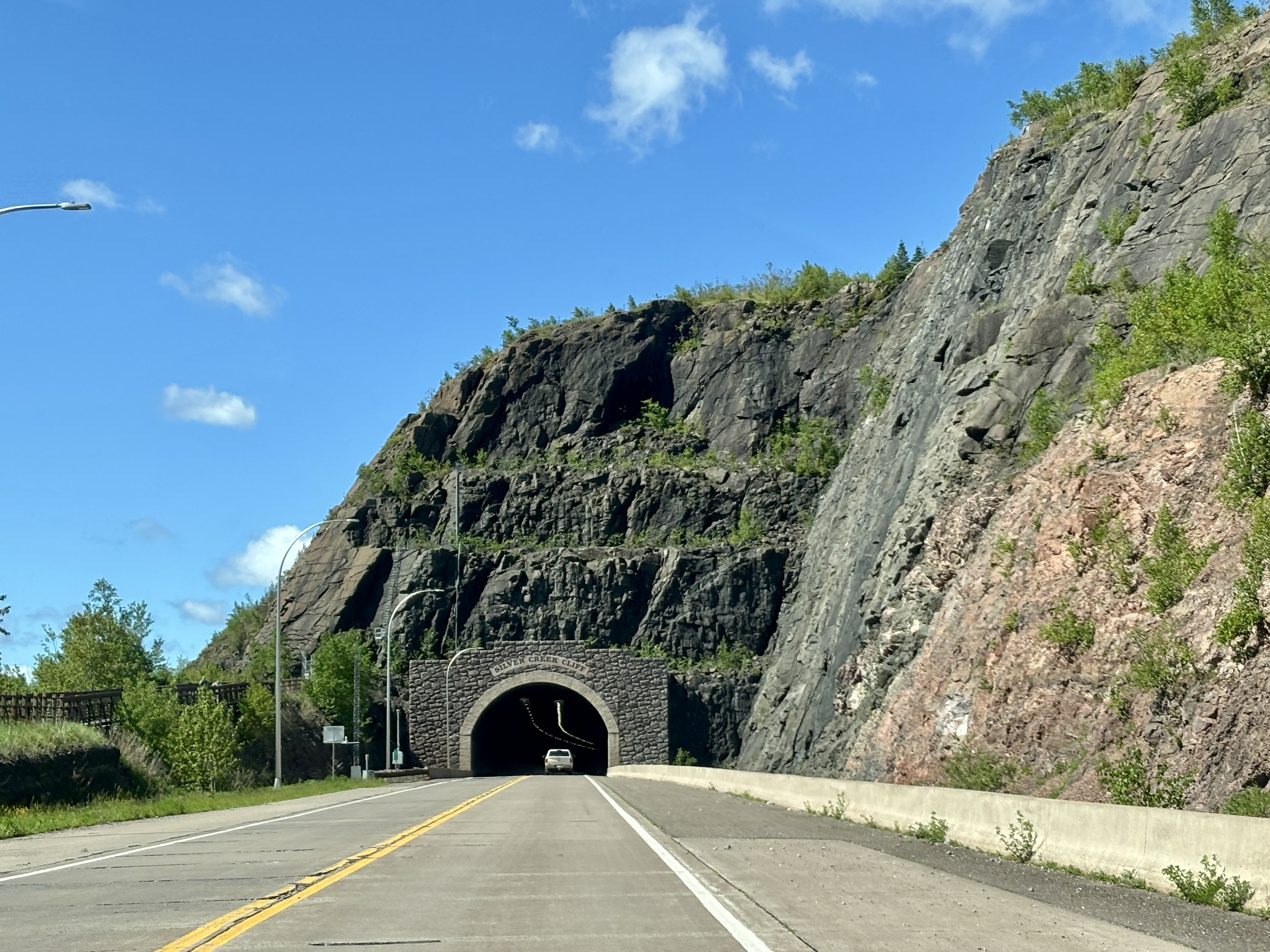
Silver Creek Cliff Tunnel, Lake County, Minnesota

- Eastman tunnel, defunct water tunnel; the tunnel ran downstream from Nicollet Island, beneath Hennepin Island, and exited below St. Anthony Falls; Minneapolis
- Ely's Peak Tunnel, abandoned rail tunnel, in use c. 1912–1984, Duluth, Winnipeg and Pacific Railway, Short Line Park southwest of Duluth, now a rail trail
- (four) Interstate 35 tunnels, short twin tunnels, between downtown Duluth and its end near London Road
- Lowry Hill Tunnel, twin tunnels, Interstate 94, near downtown Minneapolis
- Portland Tunnel, single 3-lane tunnel carrying eastbound traffic, Interstate 94 near downtown Minneapolis
- METRO Blue Line airport tunnels, 1.4 mi (2.3 km) twin bore light rail tunnels, 70 ft (21 m) under Runways 12L/30R and 12R/30L at Minneapolis–Saint Paul International Airport; Terminal 1–Lindbergh station is midway through the tunnel
- Selby Ave Trolley tunnel, two-track, abandoned and sealed, streetcar tunnel, former Twin City Rapid Transit under Selby Avenue and Shelby Hill, Saint Paul
- Silver Creek Cliff Tunnel, two-lane road tunnel, Highway 61, northeast of Two Harbors
- Lafayette Bluff Tunnel, two-lane road tunnel, Highway 61, southwest of Castle Danger

== Missouri ==
- Lindbergh Boulevard Tunnel, twin tunnels, 2006, US Route 67/Lindbergh Boulevard under runway 11/29 at St. Louis-Lambert International Airport in Bridgeton, St. Louis County
- (four) Rock Island Railroad Tunnels, abandoned rail tunnels, in use 1903/4-1980, Chicago, Rock Island & Pacific Railroad; being developed into a rail trail; from east to west:
  - Freeburg Tunnel/Rock Island Tunnel # 1, abandoned rail tunnel, in use 1903–1980, Chicago, Rock Island & Pacific Railroad, under US 63 in Freeburg in Osage County; being developed into a rail trail
  - Koesltown Tunnel/Argyle Tunnel/Rock Island Tunnel # 2, abandoned rail tunnel, in use 1903–1980, Chicago, Rock Island & Pacific Railroad, under Osage Country Road 541 west of Koeltztown in Osage County; being developed into a rail trail
  - Eugene Tunnel/Rock Island Tunnel # 3, abandoned rail tunnel, in use 1903–1980, Chicago, Rock Island & Pacific Railroad, under State Route 17 just south of Eugene; being developed into a rail trail
  - Vale Tunnel/Rock Island Tunnel # 4, abandoned rail tunnel, in use 1904–1980, Chicago, Rock Island & Pacific Railroad, under Bannister Road southeast of Raytown, Jackson County; developed into a rail trail

== Nebraska ==
- Belmont Tunnel; abandoned rail tunnel, currently a road tunnel; in use as a rail tunnel 1889–1992, bypassed 1992; Chicago, Burlington and Quincy Railroad (later BNSF Railway); in Dawes County between Marsland and Crawford; currently a BNSF service road
- (four) Scotts Bluff National Monument tunnels, Scotts Bluff National Monument west of Gering in Scotts Bluff County
  - (three) road tunnels on Summit Road, the road to the top of Scotts Bluff National Monument
  - trail tunnel on Saddle Rock Trail, the hiking trail to the top of Scotts Bluff National Monument

== Nevada ==
- Airport Tunnel (Las Vegas), tri tunnels (two road tunnels and one future transit tunnel), under runways 7L/25R and 7R/25L and several taxiways at Las Vegas McCarran International Airport, connecting the Airport Spur Connector (unsigned SR 171) to Paradise Road in Paradise
- Carlin Tunnels, twin rail tunnels and twin road tunnels, between Carlin and Elko
  - Carlin Rail Tunnels, twin rail tunnels, 1903, Union Pacific Railroad (formerly Central Pacific Railroad and Western Pacific Railroad)
  - Carlin Road Tunnel, twin road tunnels, 1975, I-80, Mile Marker 285, 0.27 miles long
- Cave Rock Tunnel, twin road tunnels, US 50, along the eastern shore of Lake Tahoe between Zephyr Cove and Glenbrook, north of Stateline

== New Jersey ==
- Atlantic City-Brigantine Connector Tunnel, twin road tunnels, 1,957 feet (596 m), joins Atlantic City Expressway and the Marina District, Atlantic City
- Bergen Arches, Erie Railroad (abandoned), beneath Bergen Hill or lower New Jersey Palisades, Jersey City. Open cut with short tunnels.
- Central Jersey Expressway (NJ 29) tunnel, Trenton
- Edgewater Tunnel New York, Susquehanna and Western Railroad (abandoned), from Fairview to Edgewater
- Holland Tunnel, beneath Hudson River between Jersey City and Manhattan
- Downtown Hudson Tubes and Uptown Hudson Tubes, Port Authority Trans-Hudson rail system beneath Hudson River between Jersey City and Manhattan
- Lincoln Tunnel, beneath Hudson River between Weehawken and Manhattan
- Long Dock Tunnel, former Erie Railroad, CSX and Norfolk Southern Railway beneath Bergen Hill or lower New Jersey Palisades, Jersey City
- Musconetcong Tunnel, 4,893 feet (1,491 m), Lehigh Valley Railroad, West Portal to Pattenburg, Hunterdon County
- Newark City Subway, New Jersey Transit, Newark
- North River Tunnels, former Pennsylvania Railroad (now Amtrak and New Jersey Transit), beneath Hudson River between Weehawken and Manhattan
- Oxford Tunnel, Delaware, Lackawanna and Western Railroad (abandoned), Oxford
- Roseville Tunnel, 1,024 feet (312 m), Delaware, Lackawanna and Western Railroad, near Andover on the Lackawanna Cut-off (abandoned but slated for restored service)
- Route 18 Tunnel (southbound only) in New Brunswick
- Vass Gap Tunnel, 800 feet (240 m), Delaware, Lackawanna and Western Railroad (abandoned), Manunka Chunk
- Weehawken Tunnel, former West Shore Railroad, Weehawken. Now used for Hudson-Bergen Light Rail.

== New Mexico ==
- Raton Tunnel, rail tunnel, BNSF (formerly Atchison, Topeka and Santa Fe Railway), under Raton Pass between Raton, New Mexico and Trinidad, Colorado
- (two) Cumbres and Toltec Scenic Railroad tunnels, narrow-gauge rail tunnels, Cumbres and Toltec Scenic Railroad (formerly Denver and Rio Grande Railway), in Rio Arriba County, New Mexico between Antonito, Colorado and Chama, New Mexico, east of Cumbres Pass; from east to west:
- Cloudcroft Tunnel, Mexican Canyon, US 82, Otero County between Alamogordo and Cloudcroft

== New York ==
New York City Subway tunnels:

- Fort George Tunnel, IRT Broadway–Seventh Avenue Line (1 train), 2 miles of rock tunnel from 157th Street to Dyckman Street, the second-longest two-track tunnel in the country (after the Hoosac Tunnel) when completed in 1906.
- 14th Street Tunnel, BMT Canarsie Line (L train) under East River between Manhattan and Brooklyn
- 53rd Street Tunnel, IND Queens Boulevard Line (E, F, and <F> trains) under East River between Manhattan and Queens
- 60th Street Tunnel, BMT Broadway Line (N, R, and W trains) under East River between Manhattan and Queens
- 63rd Street Tunnel, IND 63rd Street Line (F and M trains) under East River between Manhattan and Queens
- 149th Street Tunnel, IRT Lenox Avenue Line (2) under Harlem River between Manhattan and The Bronx
- Clark Street Tunnel, IRT Broadway–Seventh Avenue Line (2 and 3 trains) under East River between Lower Manhattan and Brooklyn
- Concourse Tunnel, IND Concourse Line (B and D trains) under Harlem River between Manhattan and The Bronx
- Cranberry Street Tunnel, IND Eighth Avenue Line (A and C trains) under East River between Lower Manhattan and Brooklyn
- Joralemon Street Tunnel, IRT Lexington Avenue Line (4 and 5 trains) under East River between Lower Manhattan and Brooklyn
- Montague Street Tunnel, BMT Broadway Line, BMT Nassau Street Line (N, R, and W trains) under East River between Lower Manhattan and Brooklyn
- Rutgers Street Tunnel, IND Sixth Avenue Line (F and <F> trains) under East River between Lower Manhattan and Brooklyn
- Steinway Tunnel, IRT Flushing Line (7 and <7> trains) under East River between Manhattan and Queens

Other tunnels in New York City:

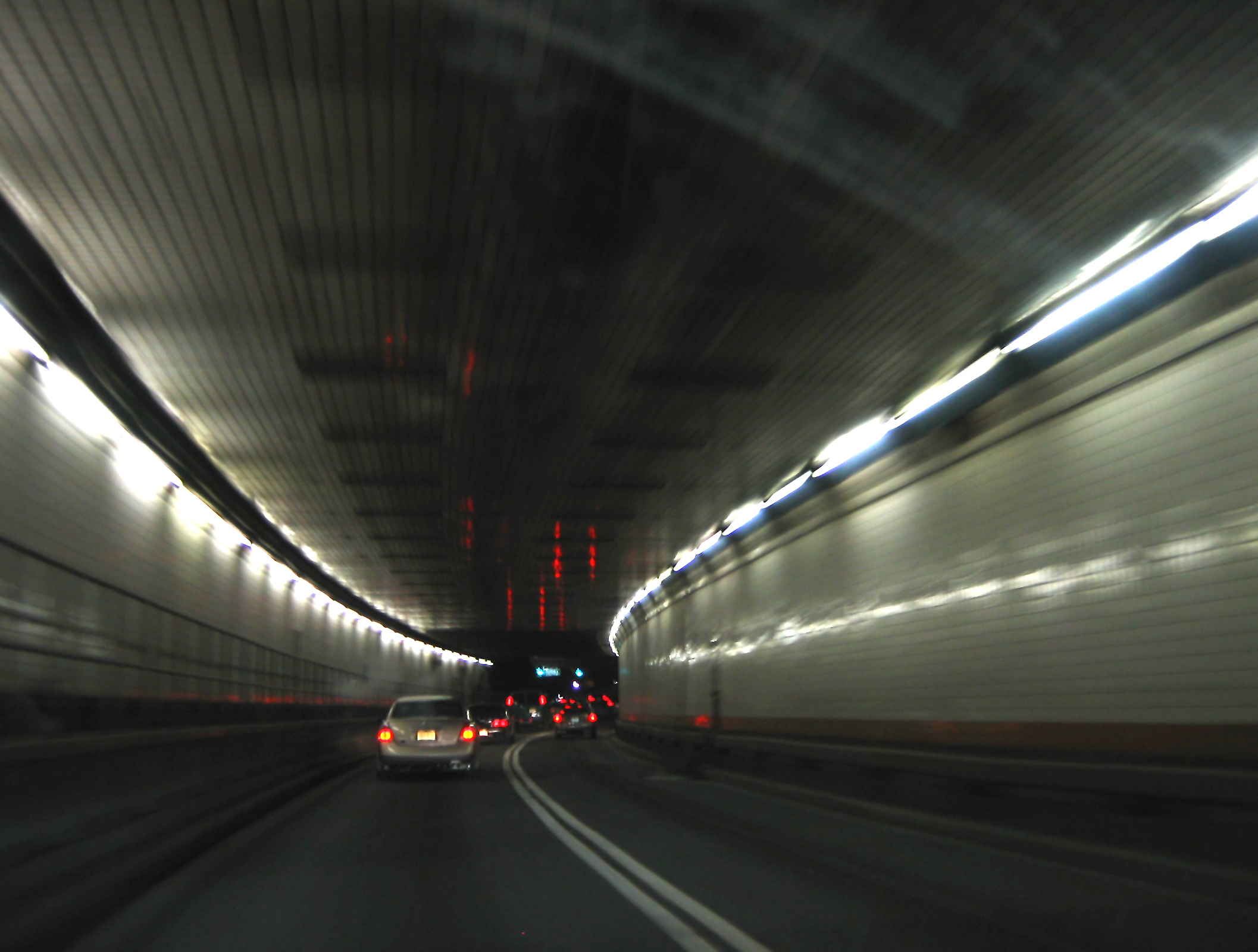
The Holland Tunnel was the first underwater tunnel designed for automobiles.

- Atlantic Avenue tunnels on Long Island Rail Road:
  - Abandoned Cobble Hill Tunnel under Atlantic Avenue, Downtown Brooklyn
  - Current Atlantic Branch tunnels under Atlantic Avenue, Downtown Brooklyn and Queens
- Brooklyn-Battery Tunnel, I-478 under East River/New York Bay between Lower Manhattan and Brooklyn
- East River Tunnels, Amtrak/Long Island Rail Road/Metro-North Railroad under East River between Midtown Manhattan and Queens
- First Avenue Tunnel, First Avenue, Midtown Manhattan
- Holland Tunnel, I-78 under Hudson River between Jersey City and Lower Manhattan
- Hudson Tubes:
  - Uptown Hudson Tubes of the Port Authority Trans-Hudson (PATH) under Hudson River between Hoboken and Midtown Manhattan
  - Downtown Hudson Tubes of the Port Authority Trans-Hudson (PATH) under Hudson River between Jersey City and Lower Manhattan
- Lincoln Tunnel, New Jersey Route 495 under Hudson River between Weehawken and Midtown Manhattan
- Park Avenue (Murray Hill) Tunnel, Park Avenue in Murray Hill, Manhattan
- North River Tunnels, Pennsylvania Railroad (now Amtrak and New Jersey Transit) under Hudson River between Weehawken and Midtown Manhattan
- Park Avenue Railroad Tunnel, Metro-North Railroad, Upper East Side, Manhattan
- Queens–Midtown Tunnel, I-495 under East River between Midtown Manhattan and Queens
- Richmond Tunnel, New York City water supply system under Upper New York Bay between Brooklyn and Staten Island
- Riverside Park Tunnel, Amtrak/Metro-North Railroad, Manhattan

Other tunnels in New York State:

- Belden Tunnel, Colesville, on the Delaware and Hudson main rail line
- New York City Water Tunnel No. 1, between Yonkers and Brooklyn via The Bronx and Manhattan
- New York City Water Tunnel No. 2, between Yonkers and Brooklyn via The Bronx and Queens
- New York City Water Tunnel No. 3, between Yonkers and Brooklyn via The Bronx, Manhattan and Queens (partially completed)
- Otisville Tunnel on Erie Railroad, Otisville, Orange County
- Shandaken Tunnel, New York City water supply system, between Schoharie Reservoir and Esopus Creek
- State Line Tunnel, Canaan, on the Boston and Albany main rail line.

== North Carolina ==
- Beaucatcher Tunnel, 1929, US 70/Tunnel Road through Beaucatcher Mountain, just east of downtown Asheville, 750 feet (230 m)
- Cowee Tunnel, rail tunnel, Great Smoky Mountains Railroad (formerly Murphy Branch, Western North Carolina Railroad), just northwest of Dillsboro in Jackson County
- Jarrett's Tunnel, rail tunnel, McDowell County, 125 feet (38 m)
- I-40 tunnels, 1 westbound, 2 eastbound, near mile marker 6, opened 1968.
- Blue Ridge Parkway tunnels from the 1930s, numbering 25 (listed by milepost north to south):
  - Little Switzerland Tunnel, milepost 333.4, 575 feet
  - Wildacres Tunnel, milepost 336.8, 350 feet
  - Twin Tunnel #1, milepost 344.5, 350 feet
  - Twin Tunnel #2, milepost 344.7, 407 feet
  - Rough Ridge Tunnel, milepost 349.0, 182 feet
  - Craggy Pinnacle Tunnel, milepost 364.4, 246 feet
  - Craggy Flats Tunnel, milepost 365.5, 403 feet
  - Tanbark Ridge Tunnel, milepost 374.4, 843 feet
  - Grassy Knob Tunnel, milepost 397.4, 802 feet
  - Pine Mountain Tunnel, milepost 399.1, 1462 feet
  - Ferrin Knob Tunnel #1, milepost 400.9, 605 feet
  - Ferrin Knob Tunnel #2, milepost 401.3, 457 feet
  - Ferrin Knob Tunnel #3, milepost 401.5, 402 feet
  - Young Pisgah Ridge Tunnel, milepost 403.0, 418 feet
  - Fork Mountain Tunnel, milepost 404.0, 392 feet
  - Little Pisgah Ridge Tunnel, milepost 406.9, 583 feet
  - Buck Spring Tunnel, milepost 407.3, 468 feet
  - Frying Pan Tunnel, milepost 410.1, 582 feet
  - Devil's Courthouse Tunnel, milepost 422.1, 721 feet
  - Pinnacle Ridge Tunnel, milepost 439.7, 859 feet
  - Lickstone Ridge Tunnel, milepost 458.8, 406 feet
  - Bunches Bald Tunnel, milepost 459.3, 290 feet
  - Big Witch Tunnel, milepost 461.2, 353 feet
  - Rattlesnake Mountain Tunnel, milepost 465.6, 415 feet
  - Sherrill Cove Tunnel, milepost 466.2, 590 feet

== North Dakota ==
- Cartwright Tunnel, located in McKenzie County, is the first and only railroad tunnel in North Dakota. It was built in 1913 but a train never traveled through it.

== Ohio ==
- Cincinnati, Lebanon, & Northern Railroad Tunnel (abandoned), adjacent to Interstate 71 at McMillan Street, Cincinnati
- Cincinnati Subway (abandoned), under Central Parkway in Cincinnati
- Coen Tunnel, Wheeling & Lake Erie Railway tunnel in Mingo Junction, Ohio
- Dalton Street Tunnel, vehicular tunnel under Union Terminal, Cincinnati
- Lytle Tunnel, tri freeway tunnels, I-71 under Lytle Park, downtown Cincinnati, 1,099 feet (335 m); the tri tunnels are side by side, from west to east:
  - a two-lane I-71 southbound tunnel
  - a one lane southbound tunnel for the I-71 exit ramp to Downtown/Riverfront/Third Street
  - a three-lane I-71 northbound tunnel
- Riverfront Transit Center, under Second Street, Cincinnati
- Tunnel Hill Tunnel, Columbus and Ohio River Railroad under U.S. Route 40 in Cambridge, Ohio.

== Oklahoma ==
- Jenson Tunnel, located in LeFlore County (just southwest of Bonanza, Arkansas), is the first and only railroad tunnel in Oklahoma. It was built through Backbone Mountain during the mid 1880s in Indian Territory by the Fort Smith & Southern Railway. It is still in operation today, primarily used by the Kansas City Southern Railway.

== Oregon ==
name	location	type	length (ft)	opened	notes	ref
Arch Cape Tunnel	US 101, 8 mi (13 km). south of Cannon Beach	automobile	1,228.1	1937	goes through Arch Cape	
Cape Creek Tunnel	Lane County on US 101	automobile	714	1931?	refs disagree over year and length 1,228.1' vs. 714'	
Cornelius Pass Tunnel	Portland	railway abandoned	4,100(?)	March 21, 1911	now owned by State of Oregon, but maintained by PWRR; closed by fire September 1994 – July 1998	
Cornell Tunnel No. 1	Portland	automobile	497.1	1940	NW Cornell Road	
Cornell Tunnel No. 2	Portland	automobile	247.1	1941	NW Cornell Road	
Dennis L. Edwards Tunnel	Sunset Highway southwest of Vernonia	automobile	772	1940	formerly called "Sunset Tunnel"	
Elk Creek Tunnel	Douglas County on OR 38	automobile	1,080.1	1938?	refs disagree over year	
Elk Rock Tunnel	Clackamas County under OR 43	rail	1,396	1921	single track S-shaped route	
Knowles Creek Tunnel	Lane County on OR 126	automobile	1,430.2	1958		
Mitchell Point Tunnel	Columbia River Gorge west of Hood River	automobile, 2 lane	385	1915	closed in 1954, demolished in 1966, part of Historic Columbia River Highway	
Mosier Twin Tunnels	Columbia River Gorge east of Mosier (near The Dalles)	automobile, 2 lane	350 (combined)	1921	part of Historic Columbia River Highway	
Oneonta Tunnel	Columbia River Gorge near Multnomah Falls	automobile, 2 lane	125	1914	part of Historic Columbia River Highway	
Robertson Tunnel	Portland	light commuter rail twin tunnels	16,368	1998	MAX Light Rail	
Rocky Butte Tunnel	NE Rocky Butte Rd. Portland	automobile	370.0?	1939	through Rocky Butte; refs disagree over length	
Salt Creek Tunnel	Lane County on OR 58	automobile	904.9	1939		
Tooth Rock Tunnel	I-84 near Cascade Locks State Park	automobile interstate	827.1?	1936	where Historic Columbia River Highway goes through Tooth Rock; refs disagree over length	
Vista Ridge Tunnels	Sunset Highway/US 26, Portland	automobile twin tunnels	1,001.0	1969	3 lanes each direction, 6% grade, curved	
Walcott Tunnel	Washington County at 45.70694°N 123.26222°W	railroad				
West Burnside Tunnel	Portland	automobile	230.0	1940	W Burnside Road	
West Side CSO Tunnel	Portland	sewer	18,000	2006	Waterfront Park	

- Many unnamed, numbered railroad tunnels exist within Oregon.

== Puerto Rico ==
- Minillas Tunnel, twin tunnels, Puerto Rico Highway 22, Santurce, San Juan
- Tren Urbano, automated subway section between Universidad and Río Piedras.
- Túnel Vicente Morales Lebrón, Puerto Rico Highway 53, Emajagua, Maunabo

== Rhode Island ==
- East Side Railroad Tunnel, abandoned and sealed rail tunnel, 5,080 feet (1,550 m), between Gano Street and Benefit Street under College Hill, in Providence
- East Side Trolley Tunnel, transit bus tunnel (converted from trolley use), 1914, 2,000 feet (610 m), between North Main Street and Thayer Street under College Hill, in Providence

== South Carolina ==
- Stumphouse Mountain Tunnel, never completed rail tunnel, Blue Ridge and Atlantic Railroad, northwest of Walhalla

== South Dakota ==
- CC Gideon Tunnel, US Route 16A in Custer State Park
- Doan Robinson Tunnel, US Route 16A in Custer State Park
- Scovel Johnson Tunnel, US Route 16A in Custer State Park
- Hood Tunnel, South Dakota Highway 87 in Custer State Park
- Needle's Eye Tunnel, South Dakota Highway 87 in Custer State Park

== Tennessee ==
- Cowan Tunnel/Cumberland Mountain Tunnel, rail tunnel, 1853, CSX Railroad (originally Nashville and Chattanooga Railroad), 2,200 feet (670 m), east of Cowan
- Cumberland Gap Tunnel, twin tunnels, US 25E, under Cumberland Gap National Historical Park, between Harrogate, Tennessee and Middlesboro, Kentucky
- Bachmann Tubes, which carry Ringgold Road through Missionary Ridge from Chattanooga into the neighboring town of East Ridge.
- Missionary Ridge Tunnels (also unofficially known as McCallie Tunnels), which carry McCallie and Bailey Avenues through Missionary Ridge where the route continues as Brainerd Road.
- US Highway 441:
  - Tunnel (northbound only), 2.7 miles north of Gatlinburg
  - Tunnel 0.2 miles west of the Chimney Tops trailhead, Great Smoky Mountains National Park between Gatlinburg and Cherokee, NC
  - The Loop, Great Smoky Mountains National Park between Gatlinburg and Cherokee, NC
  - Morton Mountain Tunnel, Great Smoky Mountains National Park between Gatlinburg and Cherokee, NC
- Wilcox Tunnel, which carries Wilcox Boulevard through Missionary Ridge and connects to Shallowford Road.
- Whiteside Tunnel (Missionary Ridge Railroad Tunnel) carries the Tennessee Valley Railroad Museum trains between East Chattanooga and Grand Junction. Construction of the tunnel was started by the Chattanooga, Harrison, Georgetown and Charleston Railroad which went bankrupt before the work was completed. The tunnel was completed by the East Tennessee and Georgia Railroad as part of their Chattanooga Branch. The railroad named the tunnel after Col. James A. Whiteside-a well known Chattanoogan and major stockholder of the East Tennessee and Georgia Railroad.
- Winchester Road Tunnel, an approximately 1,100 feet (340 m) long cut and cover tunnel going under runway 18C/36C at the Memphis International Airport in Memphis carrying 7 lanes of Winchester Road and constructed in the 1990's.

== Texas ==
- Addison Airport Toll Tunnel, Keller Springs Road under Addison Airport, Addison
- DART tunnel, twin light-rail tunnels, 3.5 miles long, between Pearl/Arts District station and SMU/Mockingbird station, Dallas
- Dallas Pedestrian Network, pedestrian tunnels, downtown Dallas
- Dead Mans Curve, tunnel, Park Route 12, Big Bend National Park
- East R.L. Thornton Freeway (Interstate 30), four tunnels under Hotel Street and four railroad lines between Stemmons Freeway (I-35E) and Botham Jean Boulevard in downtown Dallas 32.770172°N 96.801756°W
- (two) Houston Ship Channel tunnels, road tunnels; from east to west:
  - Baytown Tunnel, abandoned road tunnel, between Baytown and La Porte, demolished by 1998
  - Washburn Tunnel, under Houston Ship Channel/Buffalo Bayou, between Galena Park and Pasadena, east of Houston
- Houston tunnel system, pedestrian tunnels, downtown Houston
- Judge Alfred Hernandez Tunnel, Main Street between Naylor and Burnett Streets north of downtown Houston
- Memorial Drive, new wildlife tunnels thru Memorial Park in Houston (opened in March 2022)
- Navigation Boulevard, under Commerce Street and four railroad lines east of downtown Houston 29.757608°N 95.349464°W
- Santa Fe Terminal Complex, abandoned rail tunnels, downtown Dallas
- South R.L. Thornton Freeway (Interstate 35E), cut-and-cover tunnel between Ewing and Marsalis Avenues in the Oak Cliff neighborhood southwest of downtown Dallas; Southern Gateway Deck Park (currently under construction) will cover the freeway
- Spring Valley Road, under Central Expressway (US 75) in Richardson
- Tandy Center Subway, abandoned light rail tunnel, operated 1963–2002, Fort Worth
- Woodall Rodgers Freeway (Spur 366), cut-and-cover tunnel between Saint Paul and Pearl Streets in downtown Dallas (Klyde Warren Park covers the freeway)

== Utah ==
- Red Canyon Arches (two) on SR-12
- Twin tunnels on US 189 in Provo Canyon
- Zion – Mount Carmel Highway tunnels, 1930, 1.1 miles (1.8 km) and 480 feet (150 m) long in Zion National Park

== Vermont ==
- two New England Central Railroad tunnels, rail tunnels; from south to north:
  - Bellows Falls Tunnel, 1851, formerly Vermont Valley Railroad, Bellows Falls
  - Burlington Tunnel, 1861, formerly Central Vermont Railway, Burlington
- Middlebury Tunnel, rail tunnel under Main Street and Merchants Row, Vermont Railway used by Amtrak's Ethan Allen Express, Middlebury

== Virginia ==
- Airport Tunnel, VA 118 (Airport Road) beneath the east–west runway of Roanoke–Blacksburg Regional Airport in Roanoke.
- Bee Rock Tunnel, Appalachia
- Big Walker Mountain Tunnel, Interstate 77 south of Bland
- Blue Ridge Tunnel - 4,263 feet (1,299 m) - Chesapeake and Ohio Railway (now Buckingham Branch Railroad), Rockfish Gap
- Bluff Mountain Tunnel - 630 feet (192 m) - Blue Ridge Parkway, milepost 53.1
- Brookville Tunnel - 864 feet (263 m) - Chesapeake and Ohio Railway near Greenwood, demolished
- Chesapeake Bay Bridge-Tunnel, US 13 beneath Chesapeake Bay between Virginia Beach and Northampton County
- Church Hill Tunnel - 4,000 feet (1,200 m) - Chesapeake and Ohio Railway, Richmond, abandoned
- Colonial Parkway tunnel beneath Colonial Williamsburg historic district, Williamsburg
- Downtown Tunnel, Interstate 264 beneath Elizabeth River between Portsmouth and Norfolk
- East River Mountain Tunnel, twin tunnels, I-77, between Bland County, Virginia and Mercer County, West Virginia
- Greenwood Tunnel - 535.5 feet (163.2 m) - Chesapeake and Ohio Railway near Greenwood, abandoned
- Hampton Roads Bridge-Tunnel, Interstate 64 beneath Hampton Roads between Hampton and Norfolk
- Marys Rock Tunnel, 1932, 670 ft (200 m), mile marker 32.2 on Skyline Drive, Shenandoah National Park, south of US 211
- Midtown Tunnel, US 58 beneath Elizabeth River between Portsmouth and Norfolk
- Monitor-Merrimac Memorial Bridge-Tunnel, Interstate 664 beneath Hampton Roads between Newport News and Suffolk
- Natural Tunnel, Norfolk Southern Railway near Duffield, actually a naturally formed cave used as a railroad tunnel
- Pedestrian tunnel beneath Shirley Highway (I-395) between Army Navy Drive and Pentagon south parking lot, Arlington

== Washington ==
- Battery Street Tunnel, State Route 99, Seattle (closed and filled in 2019)
- Beacon Hill tunnel, Link light rail, Seattle
- Burwell Tunnel, Bremerton Ferry Terminal to westbound State Route 304, Bremerton
- Cascade Tunnel, BNSF Railway, near Stevens Pass
- Downtown Seattle Transit Tunnel, Link light rail (and formerly buses), Downtown Seattle
- Great Northern Tunnel, BNSF Railway, Seattle
- (three) Hurricane Ridge Road, Olympic National Park
- Keechelus Lake Wildlife Overcrossing, Interstate 90 at Keechelus Lake
- Knapp's Hill Tunnel, U.S. Route 97A, south of Lake Chelan
- Mount Baker Tunnel, twin tunnels, Interstate 90, Link light rail, and a bicycle / pedestrian tunnel, Seattle
- Northgate Link tunnel, Link light rail, Seattle
- Snoqualmie Tunnel, formerly Chicago, Milwaukee, St. Paul and Pacific Railroad, now rail-trail, near Snoqualmie Pass
- (seven) State Route 14 in the Columbia River Gorge
- (two) State Route 20 near Gorge Lake, North Cascades National Park
- State Route 99 Tunnel, State Route 99, Downtown Seattle
- State Route 123 south of Cayuse Pass, Mount Rainier National Park
- (two) Stevens Canyon Road, Mount Rainier National Park
- Stampede Tunnel, BNSF Railway, near Easton
- University Link tunnel, Link light rail, Seattle
- U.S. Route 2, west of Skykomish
- U.S. Route 12 at Rimrock Lake
- Wilburton Tunnel, Interstate 405 southbound, in Bellevue (demolished in 2008)

== West Virginia ==
- (two) Big Bend Tunnels, rail tunnels, CSX (formerly Chesapeake and Ohio Railway), just west of Talcott
  - Great Bend Tunnel, abandoned rail tunnel, in use 1873–1974, 6,477 feet (1,974 m), Chesapeake and Ohio Railway
  - Big Bend Tunnel, active rail tunnel, 1932, 6,188 feet (1,886 m)
- Board Tree Tunnel, abandoned rail tunnel, 1858, 2,350 feet (720 m), Baltimore and Ohio Railroad, north of Littleton
- Breeden Tunnel, former Norfolk and Western Railway tunnel and present-day road tunnel, near Breeden
- Dingess Tunnel, former Norfolk and Western Railway tunnel and present-day road tunnel, near Dingess
- (four) Magnolia Cutoff Tunnels, twin-track rail tunnel, 1914, CSX (formerly Baltimore and Ohio Railroad), northeast of Paw Paw, one in Maryland; from northeast to southwest:
  - Randolph Tunnel, 1,015 feet (309 m), northeast of Hansrote
  - Stuart Tunnel, 3,355 feet (1,023 m), between Hansrote and Magnolia
  - (Graham Tunnel, 1,592 feet (485 m), Allegany County, Maryland; northeast of Paw Paw, West Virginia)
  - Carothers Tunnel, 996 feet (304 m), just northeast of Paw Paw
- East River Mountain Tunnel, twin tunnels, I-77, between Mercer County, West Virginia and Bland County, Virginia
- (two) Kingwood Tunnels, rail tunnels, Baltimore and Ohio Railroad, just west of Tunnelton
  - abandoned rail tunnel, 1858, 4,137 feet (1,261 m), abandoned and sealed 1962
  - active rail tunnel, twin tracks, 1912
- Knobley Tunnel, abandoned rail tunnel on the Patterson Creek Cutoff
- Memorial Tunnel, abandoned and bypassed 2-lane road tunnel, 2,802 feet (854 m), formerly West Virginia Turnpike/I-77
- Tunnel No. 1, Baltimore and Ohio Railroad, Wheeling
- Wheeling Tunnel, twin tunnels, 0.27 miles (430 m), I-70, Wheeling

== Wisconsin ==
- Mitchell Interchange (three tunnels) in Milwaukee 42.962178°N 87.935369°W
  - Interstate 43 (northbound only) with first tunnel under Interstate 41 and second tunnel under Interstate 94
  - Interstate 41 (northbound only) transition road under Interstate 94
- South Howell Avenue (Wisconsin Highway 38) beneath Runway 7R at Milwaukee Mitchell International Airport in Milwaukee 42.941144°N 87.909384°W
- Kilbourn Tunnels (two) in Milwaukee, on/off ramps from northbound Interstate 43 to Kilbourn Avenue 43.041607°N 87.920297°W

== Wyoming ==
- Cody Mountain Tunnels, three tunnels, US 14 / US 16 / US 20 east of Yellowstone National Park near the Buffalo Bill Dam
- Green River Tunnel, twin tunnels, 1,138 feet (347 m) (0.22 miles) long, I-80, Green River Mile Marker 89
- Tunnel on Hayden Arch Road near the Buffalo Bill Dam (pedestrian / bicycle tunnel with limited vehicular access)
- Wind River Canyon:
  - Three highway tunnels on US 20 north of the Boysen Dam.
  - Five railroad tunnels (one abandoned and collapsed) on the BNSF Railway line north of the Boysen Dam.
  - Boysen Railway Tunnel, 1.25 miles long, on the BNSF Railway line at Boysen Reservoir, built in 1950 to re-route the railroad due to construction of the nearby Boysen Dam and Reservoir.
