= Eugene Tunnel =

Tunnel in Eugene, Missouri, U.S.

- Interactive map of Eugene Tunnel

Overview
- Location: Under Missouri Route 17 at Eugene, Missouri
- Coordinates: 38.352118°N 92.396704°W
- System: Formerly the Chicago, Rock Island and Pacific railroad

Operation
- Opened: 1903
- Closed: 1980

Technical
- No. of tracks: Single

The Eugene Tunnel is a railway tunnel in Cole County, Missouri. It was built by the Chicago, Rock Island and Pacific Railroad (the Rock Island) in 1903, and is tunnel number three of four on this line from Kansas City to St. Louis, Missouri line. The tunnel is a pointed-arch shape, and goes west to east in direction.

Regular, daily service on this portion of the Rock Island's network ended in August, 1979, with the final train passing through the tunnel in December of that year. The Rock Island Railroad ceased operations entirely, and was liquidated, after March 31, 1980. Many court hearings, and wants of this line have happened over the years. Union Pacific Railroad originally owned the line after the Rock's bankruptcy. It then was sold to the Missouri Central Railroad. Later the MRC was bought by utility giant Ameren, which now owns the line.
