= Vale Tunnel =

- Interactive map of Vale Tunnel

Overview
- Line: Formerly the Kansas City to St. Louis, Missouri line
- Coordinates: 38°56′52″N 94°26′07″W
- System: Formerly Missouri Central Railroad
- Crosses: Bannister Road, Kansas City, Missouri, USA

Operation
- Opened: 1904
- Closed: 1980
- Reopened: 2021

Technical
- No. of tracks: Single

The Vale Tunnel is a railway tunnel south of Raytown, Missouri in the Kansas City metropolitan area. It was built by the Chicago, Rock Island and Pacific railroad in 1903-1904, and became the final tunnel of four to be built on the entire Rock Island railroad, all of which were in Missouri. The tunnel is part of the Kansas City to St. Louis, Missouri line, and travels beneath Bannister Road. In 1980, the Rock Island was liquidated in court and the tunnel and line across Missouri was eventually sold to the St. Louis Southwestern Railway (or Cotton Belt).

The tunnel is 441 feet (134 m) long.

Since 1980, the line changed owners several times after the Rock Island went bankrupt. Most of the line remains intact, as does the tunnel, except for a few places where it has been cut for road improvements.

In 2016, the line was bought by Jackson County, Missouri. The line was converted into the Rock Island Rail Trail. The first phase was completed in June 2019, and was 6.4 miles (10.3 km). The second phase was opened in July 2021 with an additional 7 miles, for a total length of 13.5 miles (21.7 km). Vale Tunnel has received lighting and is a centerpiece of the trail.
