= Koeltztown Tunnel =

Railway tunnel in Osage County, Missouri, U.S.

Coordinates: 38.31375°N 92.08076°W

- Interactive map of Koeltztown Tunnel

Overview
- Official name: Argyle Tunnel (CRI&P Tunnel 2)
- Line: Formerly the Kansas City to St. Louis, Missouri line
- Location: Under the CR 541 country road, Osage County, Missouri, USA
- System: Formerly Missouri Central Railroad

Operation
- Opened: 1903
- Closed: 1980

Technical
- No. of tracks: Single

The Koeltztown Tunnel is a railway tunnel in Osage County, Missouri. It was built in 1903 by the Chicago, Rock Island and Pacific railroad. The tunnel is part of the former Kansas City to St. Louis, Missouri line, and is tunnel two of four. The line was once owned by the Missouri Central Railroad, but now is owned by the utility giant Ameren.
