= Missouri Eastern Railroad =

American shortline railroad

Overview
- Reporting mark: MER
- Locale: Missouri
- Dates of operation: 2022–

Technical
- Track gauge: 4 ft 8 1/2 in (1,435 mm) standard gauge

The Missouri Eastern Railroad is a class III American shortline railroad in Missouri that began operations in 2022. It operates a 53-mile (85-km) long railroad in the St. Louis suburbs between Vigus in Union and Rock Island Junction in Overland.

The rail line was once part of the mainline of the Chicago, Rock Island and Pacific Railroad. When the Rock Island was liquidated in 1980, the line was purchased by the Southern Pacific Railroad's subsidiary the St. Louis Southwestern Railway, known as the Cotton Belt. The Cotton Belt merged into its parent in 1992. The line became part of the Union Pacific Railroad in 1996 when the Southern Pacific merged with the U.P. The U.P. leased the track to the Central Midland Railway. The U.P. sold the track to the Missouri Eastern in 2021 and the Central Midland ceased operations.

The railroad owns part of its line and leases the remainder.

In 2021, the Missouri Eastern bought from V&S Railway, LLC, 42.89 miles (69.02 km) of track between milepost 19.0 near Vigus in Maryland Heights and milepost 61.89 near Union.

The Missouri Eastern assumed from the Central Midland the lease of 8.65 miles (13.92 km) of track between Vigus and Rock Island Junction. The Union Pacific owns the track. When it acquired the lease, the Missouri Eastern assumed Central Midland's obligations as a common carrier.

The Missouri Eastern interchanges with the Terminal Railroad Association of St. Louis at Overland.

The Missouri Eastern is a subsidiary of Jaguar Transport Holdings, based in Joplin, Missouri.
