= Edwardsville, Indiana =

- Unincorporated community
- Location within Indiana Location within the United States
- Coordinates: 38°17′03″N 85°54′34″W
- Country: United States
- State: Indiana
- County: Floyd
- Township: Georgetown
- Elevation: 912 ft (278 m)
- ZIP code: 47122
- FIPS code: 18-20476
- GNIS feature ID: 434034

Edwardsville is an unincorporated community in Georgetown Township, Floyd County, Indiana. The Duncan Tunnel is located within the community.

== History ==
Edwardsville was platted in 1853 by Henry H. Edwards, and named for him. A post office was established at Edwardsville in 1858, and remained in operation until it was discontinued in 1905.

In 1881, the Duncan Tunnel (commonly called the Edwardsville Tunnel) was completed by the Southern Railway. Spanning about 4,295 feet, it remains the longest railroad tunnel in Indiana, originally constructed to navigate the difficult terrain of Floyds Knobs and now in use by Norfolk Southern Railway.

== Geology ==
The Edwardsville Formation is a geological structure in the Borden Group, of the Lower Mississippian sub system, (Osagean, late Tournaisian). Crinoids fossils can be found in the formation.
