= Ely's Peak =

Geological feature in Minnesota

Coordinates: 46°40′54″N 92°15′14″W

Ely's Peak is a geological geographic feature located in Gary - New Duluth, Duluth, Minnesota. It is 1,133 ft. at its tallest point. Ely’s Peak is a public recreation site, used for both hiking and rock climbing. For hikers, there is a section of the Superior Hiking Trail that ascends and rounds the peak and then continues up the North Shore. Those seeking to rock climb have several route options, as there are 18 established routes on the peak’s face. A train tunnel under the peak, no longer used as a railway, had been a part of the Duluth, Winnipeg and Pacific Railway, or DWP. The peak itself was named after Edmund F. Ely, a Presbyterian missionary from Wilbraham, Massachusetts. In 1834 he began teaching the Fon Du Lac Native American community. He was also responsible for the founding and settlement of Oneota (Duluth), located in present-day West Duluth.

== Superior Hiking Trail ==
The Superior Hiking Trail has two optional routes near Ely’s Peak; one is a 300-ft "spur trail" that ascends the peak, arriving on the top; the other rounds the peak and descends into a maple-forest area that overlooks the City of Duluth. Together, these two trails provide 0.9 miles of hiking at Ely's Peak.

== Train Tunnel and the Railway ==
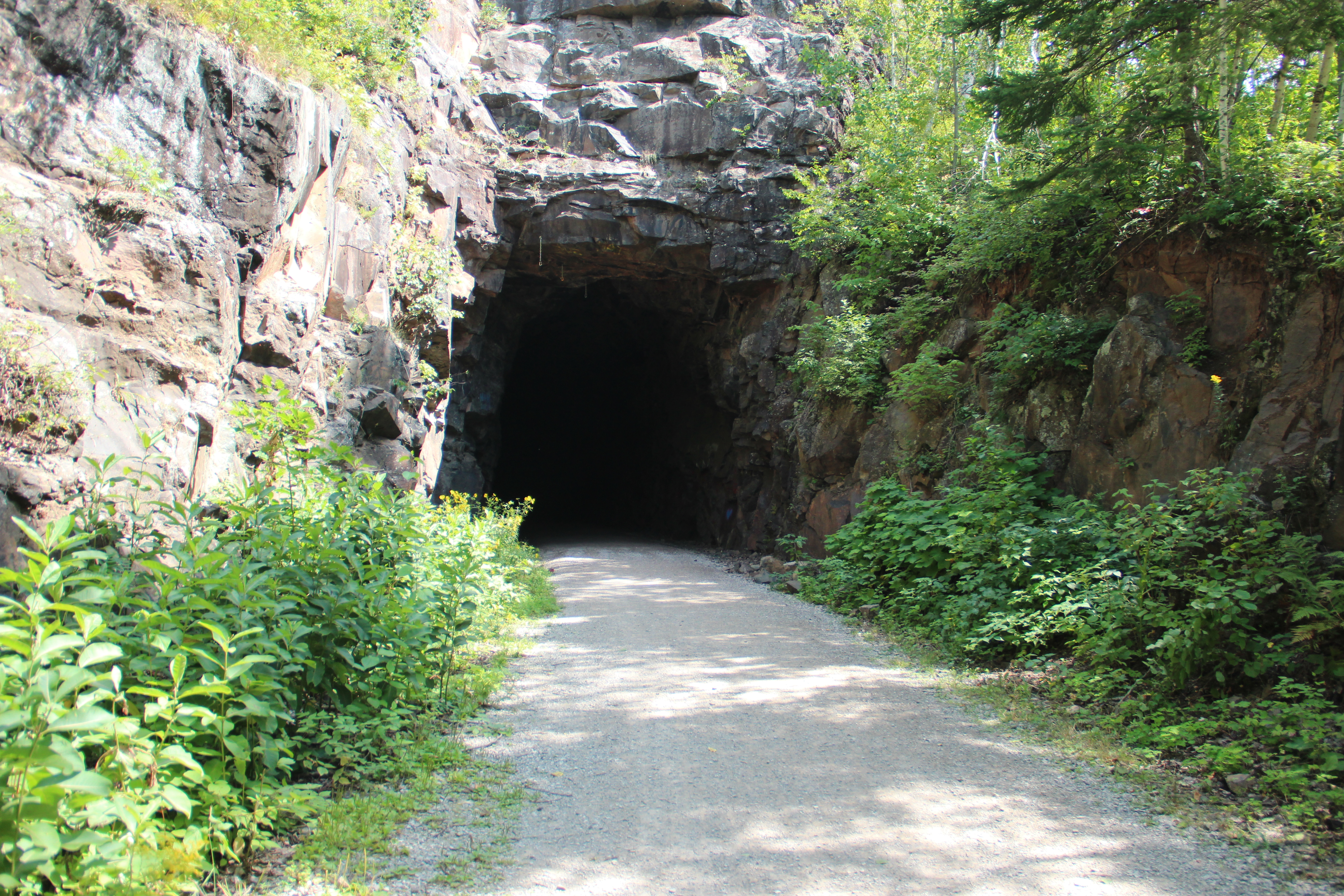
Duluth, Winnipeg and Pacific Railway tunnel

The Duluth, Winnipeg and Pacific Railway had a tunnel carved through Ely’s Peak, with excavation beginning in August 1910. The DWP decided constructing a tunnel would be better than constructing a railway over or around Ely's Peak. The excavation crew included 120 men – 60 on each side of the mountain – and these crews would meet in the middle a year later. On August 15, 1911, the tunnel was ready for train tracks to be laid. The tunnel lies on a 7 degree curve, is about 520 ft long, and 18 ft wide. In 1912, the railway finally reached Duluth, allowing it to then connect with several other US Railways. This tunnel was used heavily up until 1996, when Canadian National Railway took over DWP, and the tunnel was abandoned.
