= Duncan Tunnel =

Coordinates: 38°17′22.5″N 85°55′07″W

- Interactive map of Duncan Tunnel

Overview
- Other name: Edwardsville Tunnel
- Location: Edwardsville, Floyd County, Indiana

Operation
- Opened: 1881
- Operator: Norfolk Southern Railway

Technical
- Line length: 4,295 ft

The Duncan Tunnel (also known as the Edwardsville Tunnel) is a railroad tunnel in Edwardsville, Floyd County, Indiana, USA. At 4,295 feet (1,309 m) long, it is the longest tunnel in Indiana. The tunnel was initially built for the Air Line, who were unable to find a suitable route over the Floyds Knobs, so they decided to tunnel through them. The tunnel was completed by the Southern Railway in 1881 at a total cost of $1 million. It is still in use by the Norfolk Southern Railway. The tunnel passes beneath I-64 intersection #118.
