= Pitkin Tunnel =

- Interactive map of Pitkin Tunnel

Overview
- Other name: Pitkin Street Tunnel
- Location: New Haven, Connecticut
- Start: Elm Street

The Pitkin Tunnel or Pitkin Street Tunnel is a below-ground-level, roofed but not entirely enclosed roadway, in downtown New Haven, Connecticut, United States. It accommodates simultaneous motor vehicle traffic in both directions. The tunnel runs from the eastbound one-way Elm Street between Church and Orange Streets (), with the southbound lanes of State Street between Court and Chapel Streets () across from State Street station. It passes under Orange Street. It runs under or next to the New Haven City Hall and County Courthouse and the Federal Courthouse on Church Street, the local Emergency Operations Center, and at least three more buildings that house banks and the headquarters of United Illuminating, the electric utility serving much of New Haven and Fairfield counties.

The tunnel provides access to a parking garage and to loading docks; motorists with no interest in those facilities are reported to use the tunnel as a convenient route to avoid traffic lights and congestion.

== Security ==
In 2003, the United States Marshals Service and General Services Administration provided funds which were used to install surveillance cameras, gates for closing the tunnel, and booths to accommodate guards. As of 2005, the gates are open 16 hours a day, five days a week, with the only security personnel in the tunnel being occasional patrols by city police. The lack of guards to control access at those times has drawn attention of the state's news media.

In February 2007, plans were announced to enhance security, apparently in anticipation of extradition from the United Kingdom, and trial in New Haven, of a person charged with conspiracy in a terrorism-related case. One measure is to be armed guards who are not visible to the public.
