= Cowan Tunnel =

Railroad tunnel near Cowan, Tennessee, U.S.

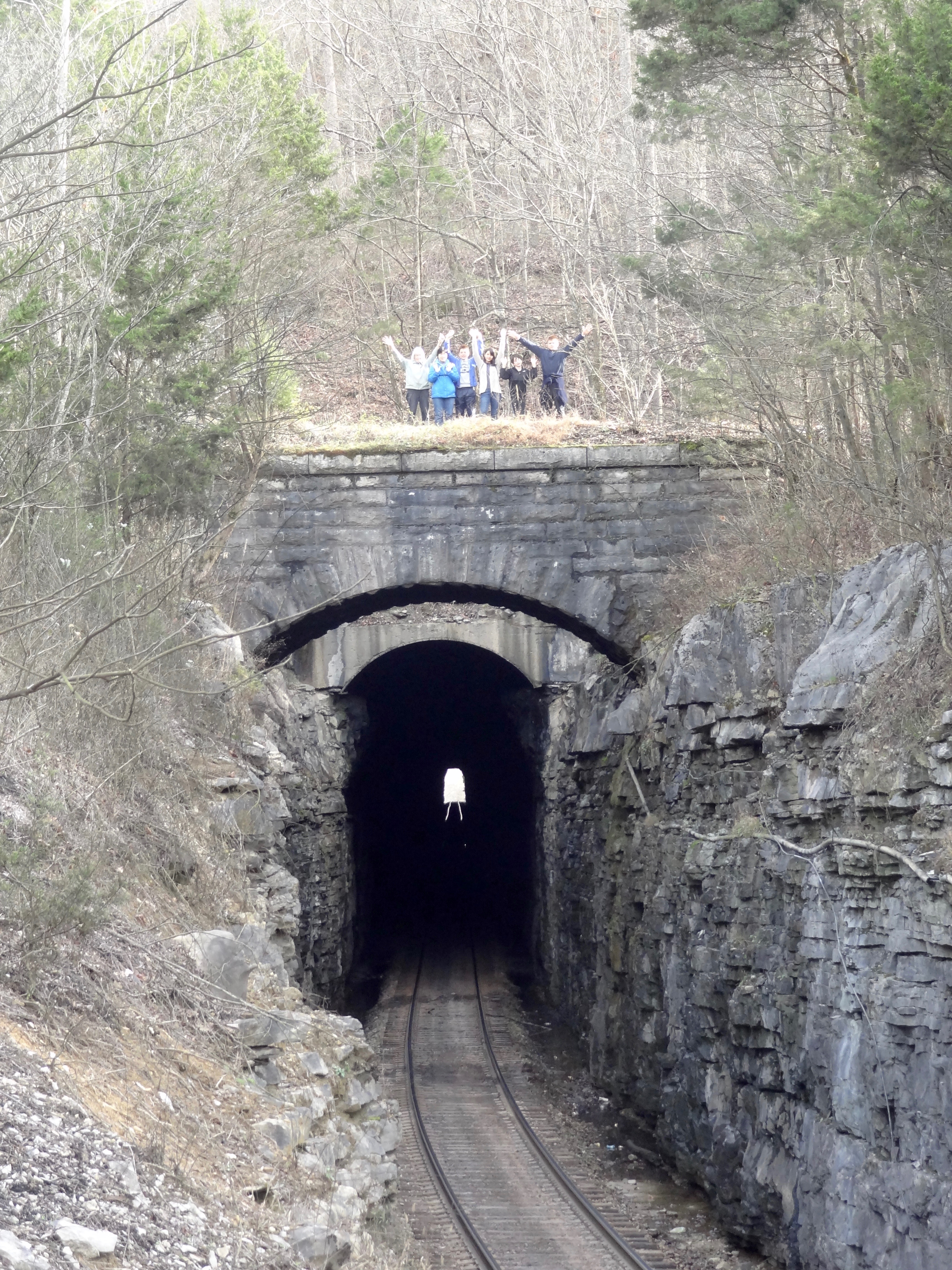
- View from north end into tunnel interior. The old Mountain Goat rail bed bridge is in the foreground.
- Interactive map of Cowan Tunnel

Overview
- Coordinates: 35°09′08″N 85°58′31″W
- Status: Open
- Start: 35°09′15.3828″N 85°58′42.2004″W
- End: 35°09′2.4336″N 85°58′21.2268″W

Operation
- Constructed: 1849–1853
- Opened: 1853
- Owner: CSX Railroad

Technical
- Length: 2,200 ft (670 m)
- Cumberland Mountain Tunnel
- U.S. National Register of Historic Places
- Location within Tennessee Location within the United States
- Nearest city: Cowan, Tennessee
- Area: 42 acres (17 ha)
- Built: 1849
- Built by: Thomas C. Bates
- Engineer: James H. Grant (chief); E. D. Sanford, Minor Merriweather (assistants)
- NRHP reference No.: 77001270
- Added to NRHP: August 22, 1977

The Cowan Tunnel, or Cumberland Mountain Tunnel, is a railroad tunnel near Cowan, Tennessee.

The tunnel was built by the Nashville & Chattanooga Railroad Company and was completed in 1852 with the tracks laid in 1853 with a total length of 2,200 ft (670 m). The strategically important tunnel, part of the rail linkage between the Midwestern United States and the Southeastern United States, played a vital role during the American Civil War. It was considered a major engineering feat at the time. It is still operational and owned by CSX Railroad. The tunnel was listed on the National Register of Historic Places in 1977.

== History ==
Construction on the tunnel began in 1849 and was completed in 1852 with the tracks completed in 1853. Work was undertaken by slaves, Irish immigrants, and local workers with Swiss engineers. Three ventilation shafts approximately 170 ft (52 m) deep were created during the construction to facilitate air circulation, provide additional work areas, and to enable evacuation of steam and smoke from the steam locomotives during use. The importance of the tunnel was recognized during the American Civil War with both sides fighting over but never destroying the tunnel. The use of the tunnel continues today with freight trains frequently running through it.

== Gallery ==
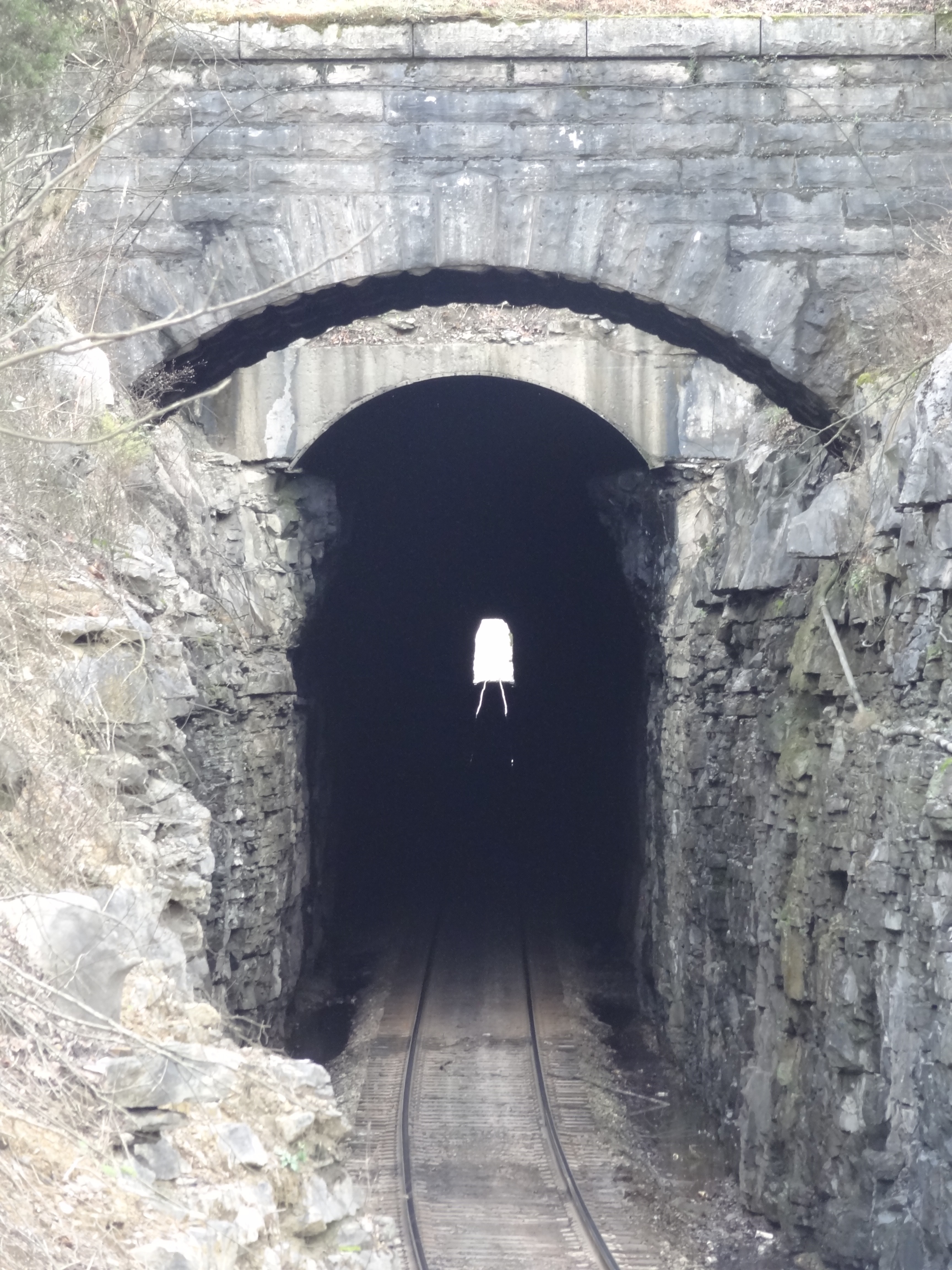
Tunnel interior from the north with the Mountain Goat rail bridge in the foreground.

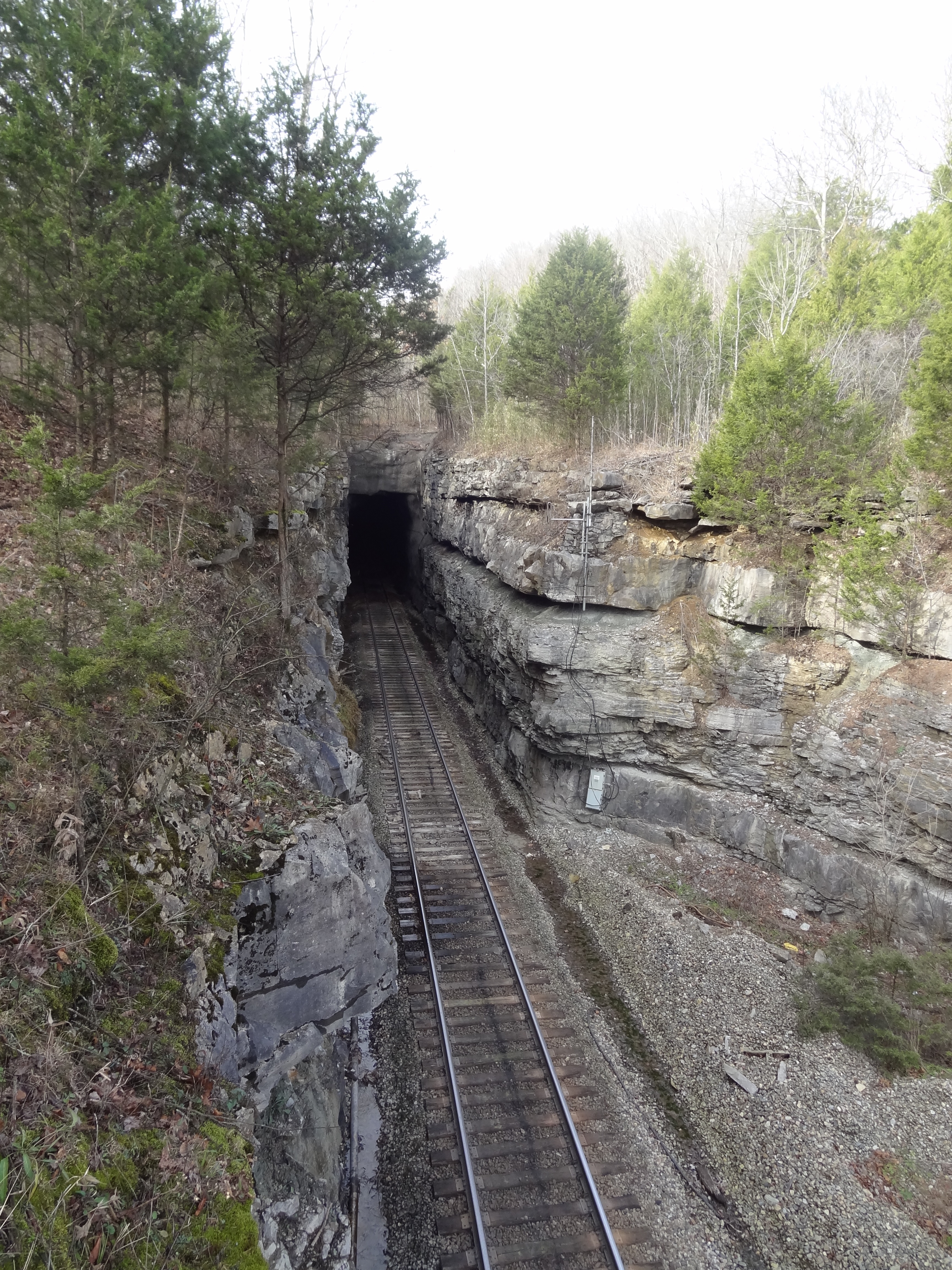
Tunnel entrance from the south looking north.

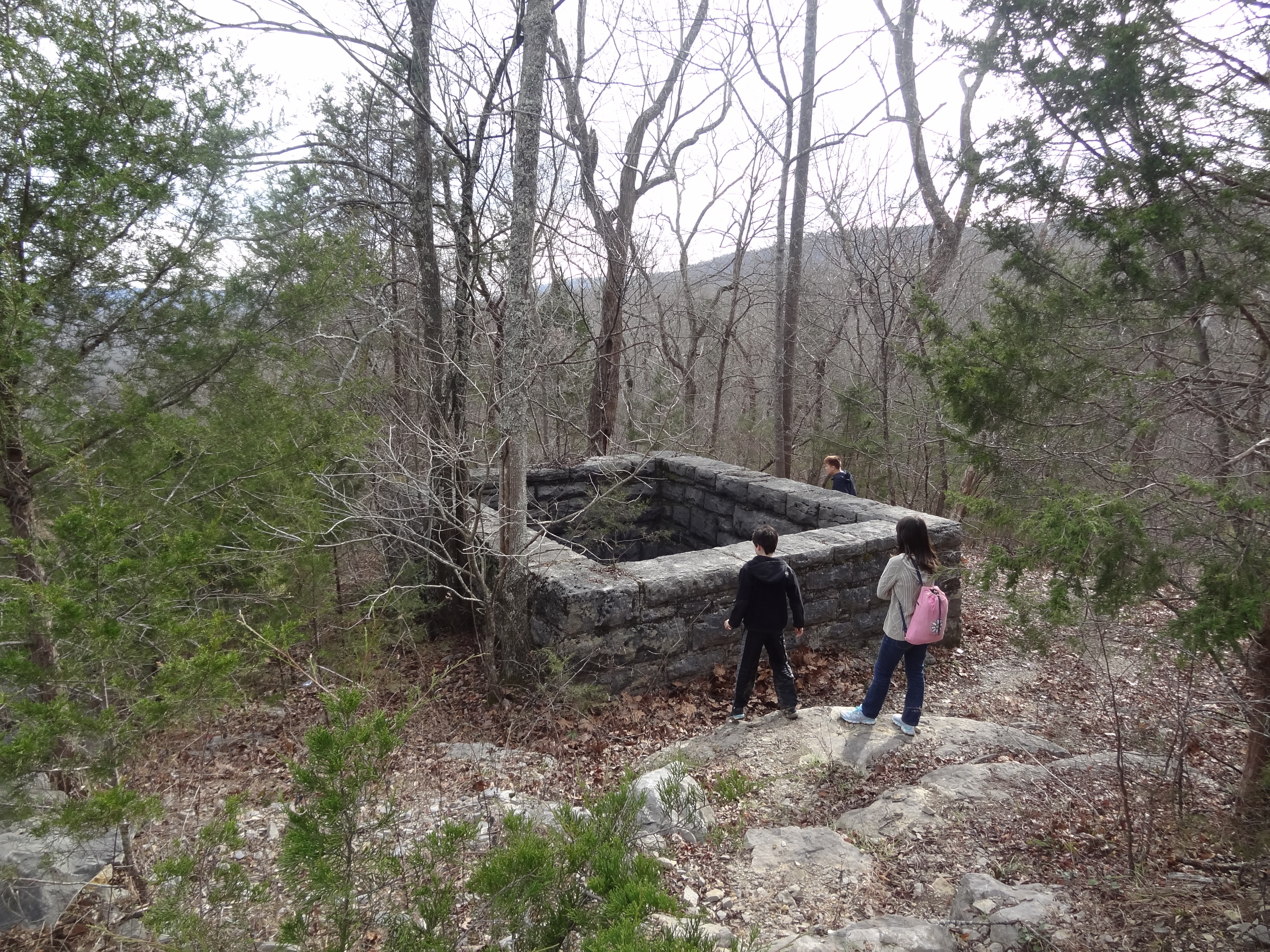
Southern tunnel vent exterior.

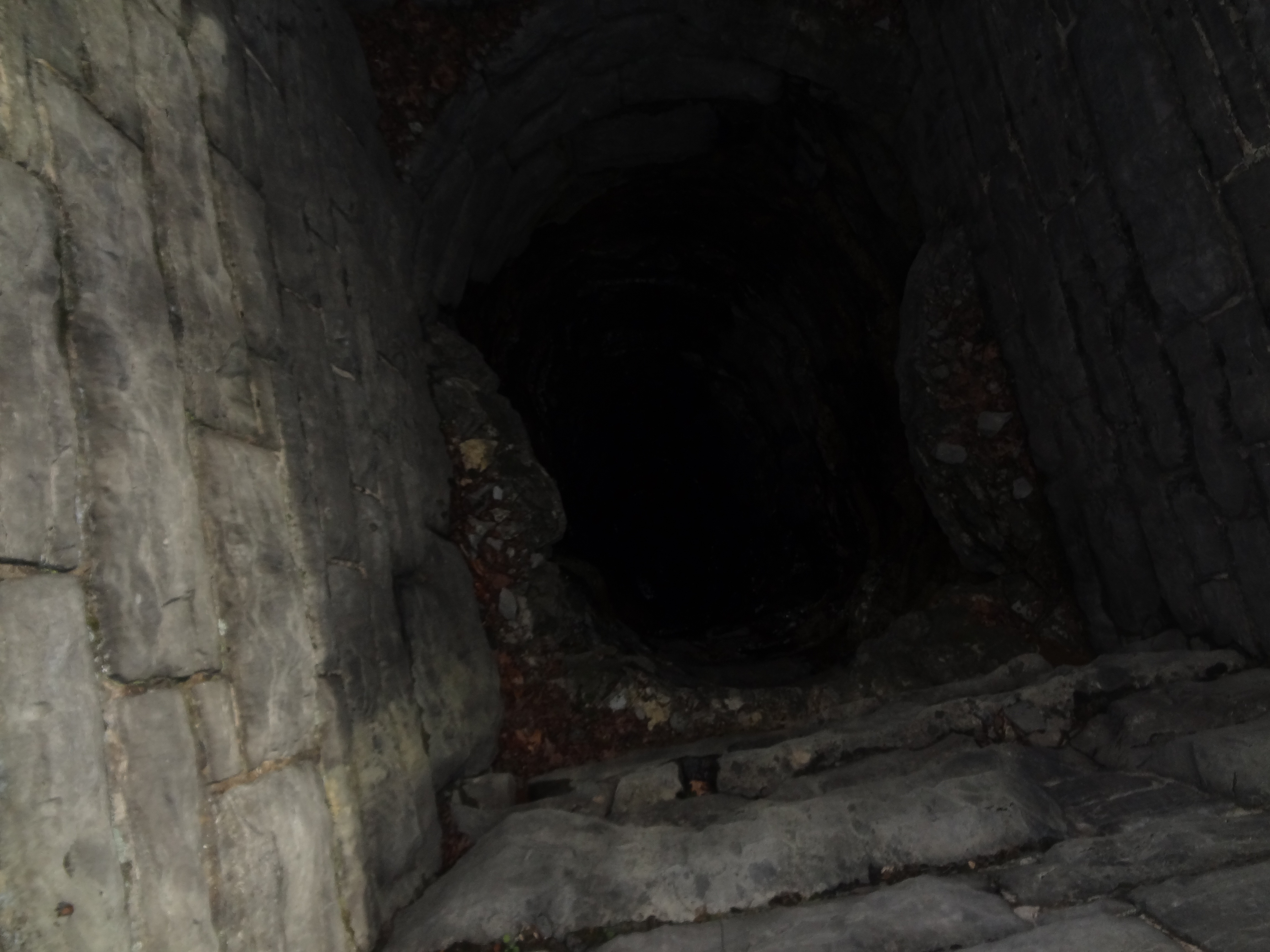
Southern tunnel vent interior.

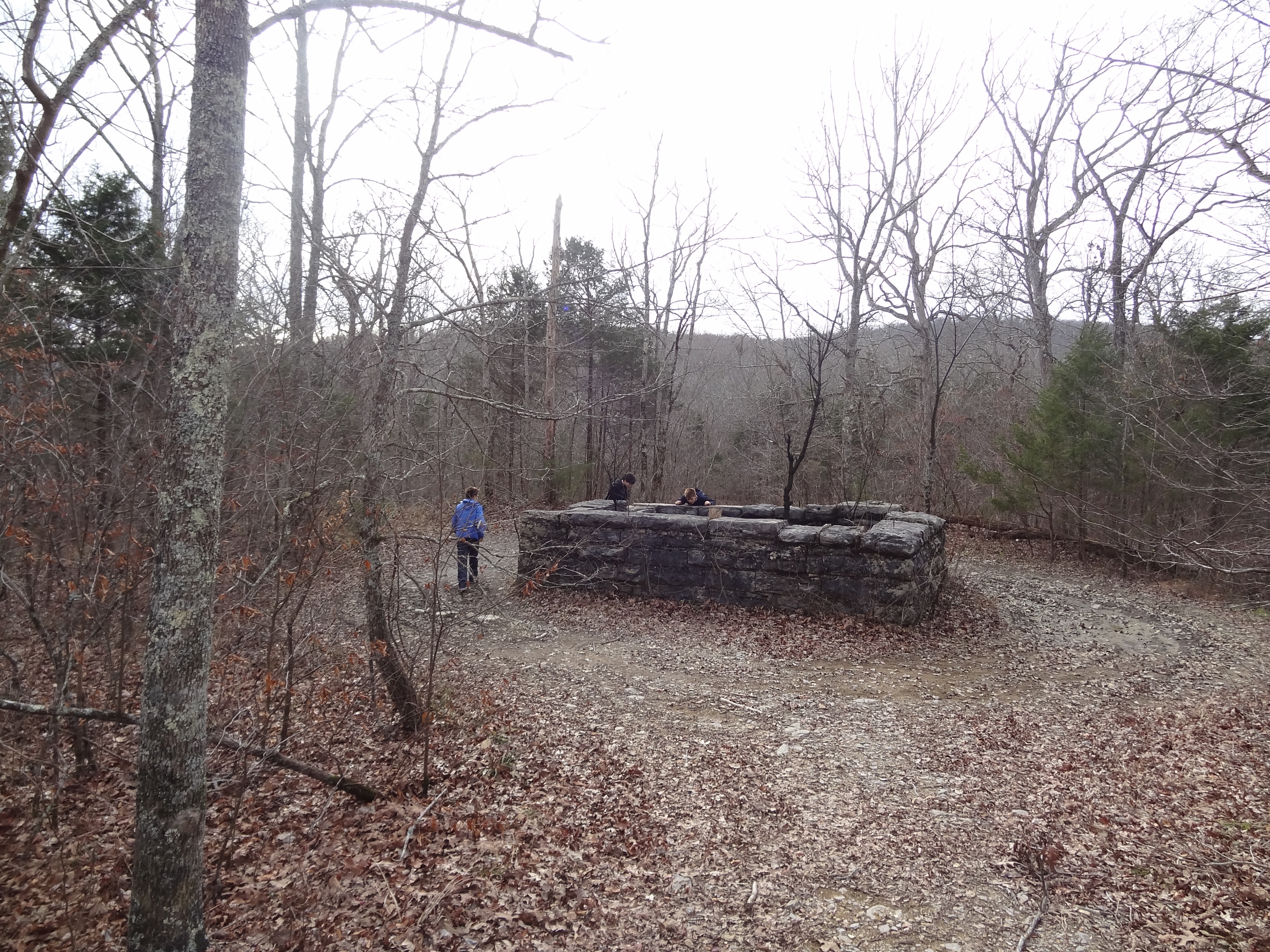
Middle tunnel vent exterior.

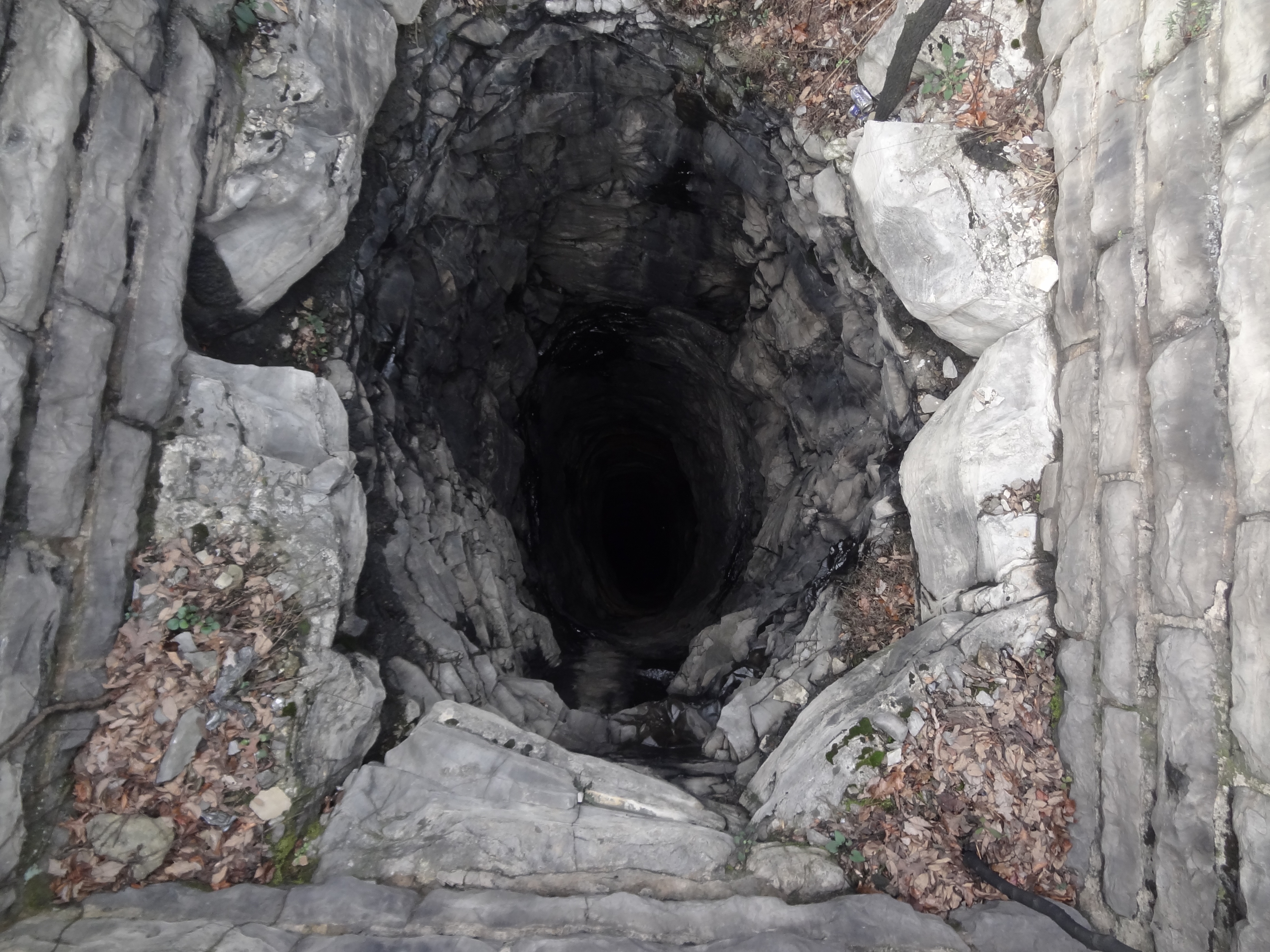
Middle tunnel vent interior.

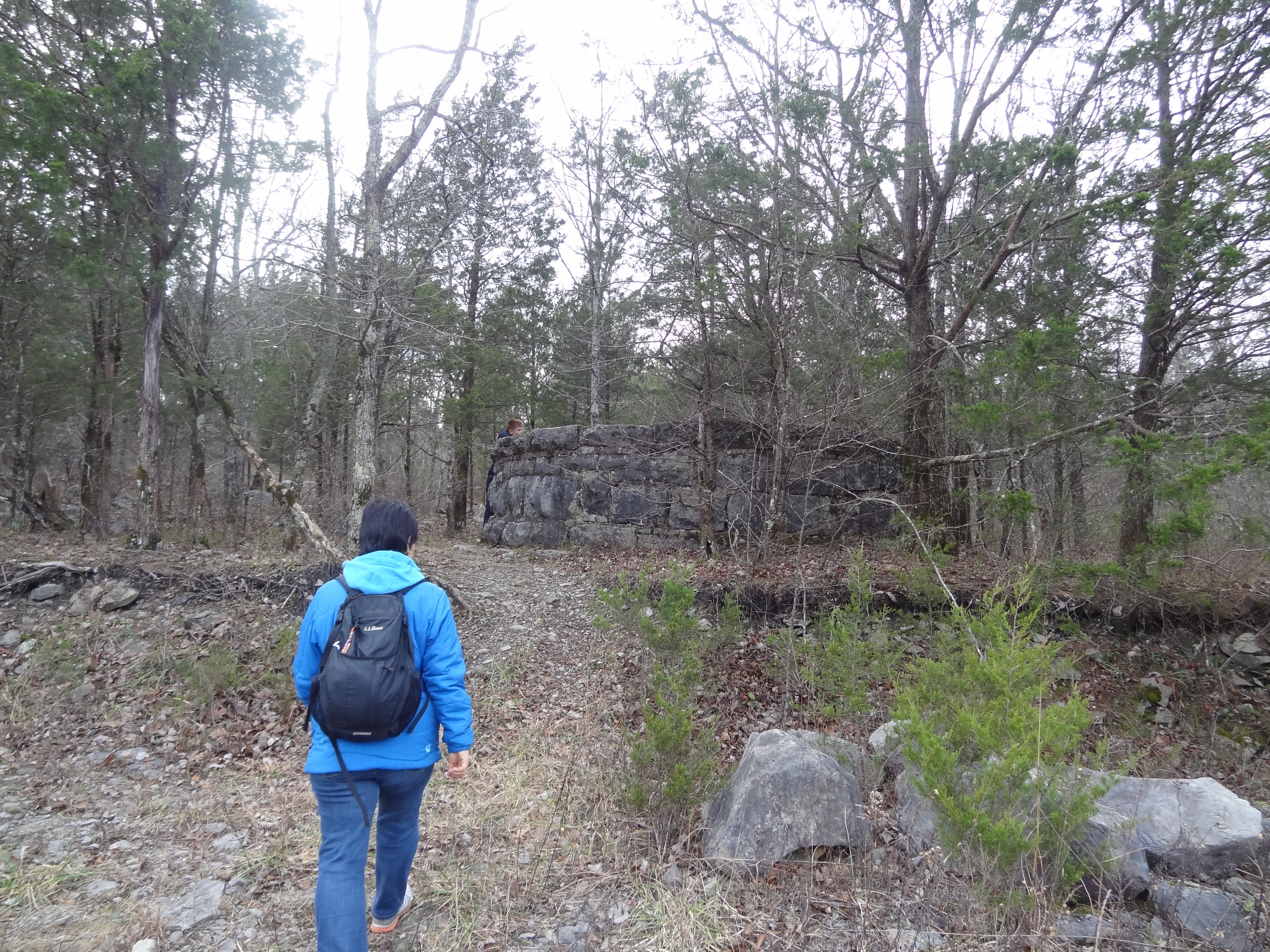
Northern tunnel vent exterior.

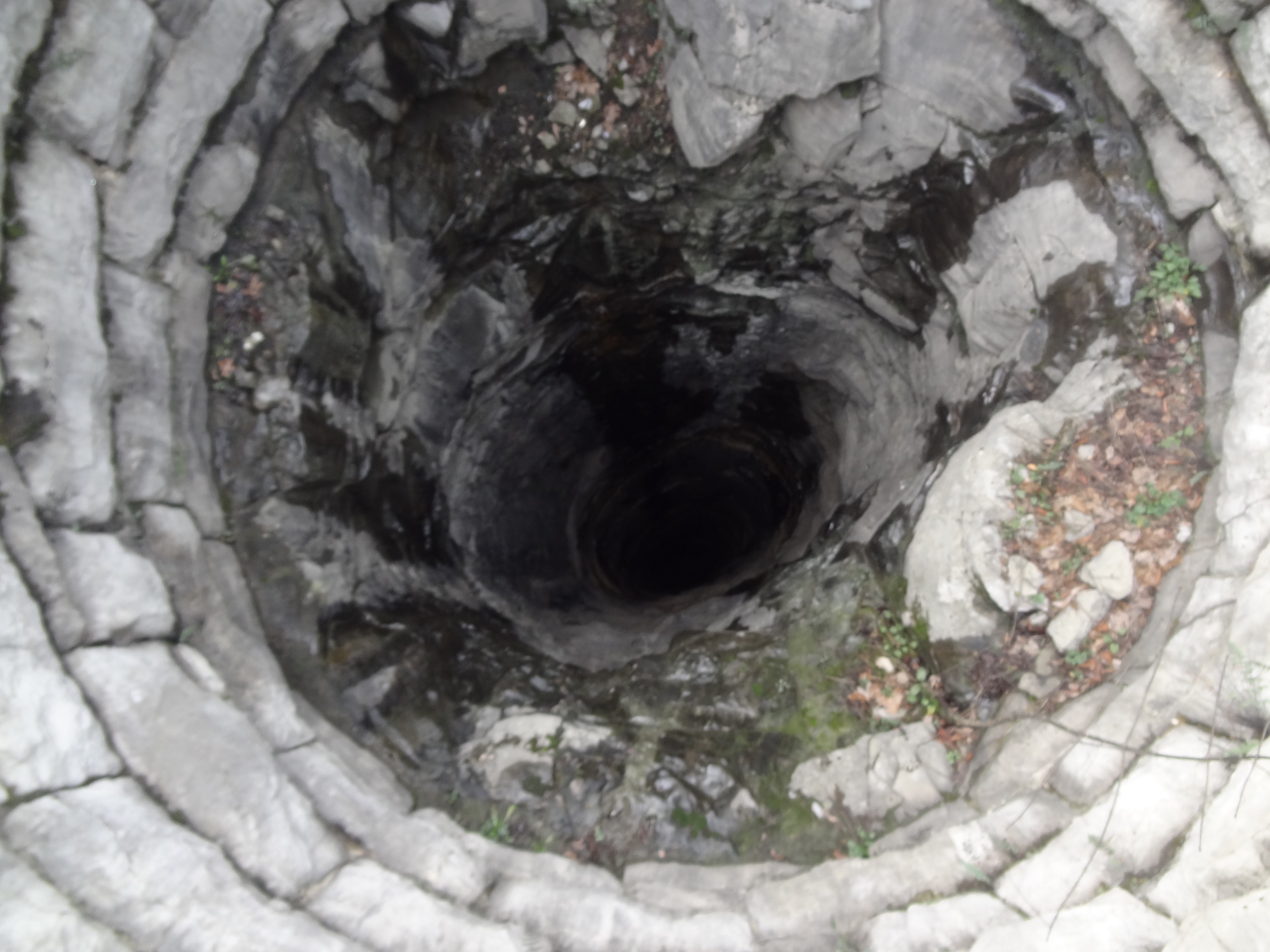
Northern tunnel vent interior.

== Bibliography ==
- Smith, Gerald (2010). Sewanee Places. The University of the South. ISBN 978-0-918769-57-2.
