= Cricket and Crest Tunnels =

- Cricket and Crest Tunnels Historic District
- U.S. National Register of Historic Places
- U.S. Historic district
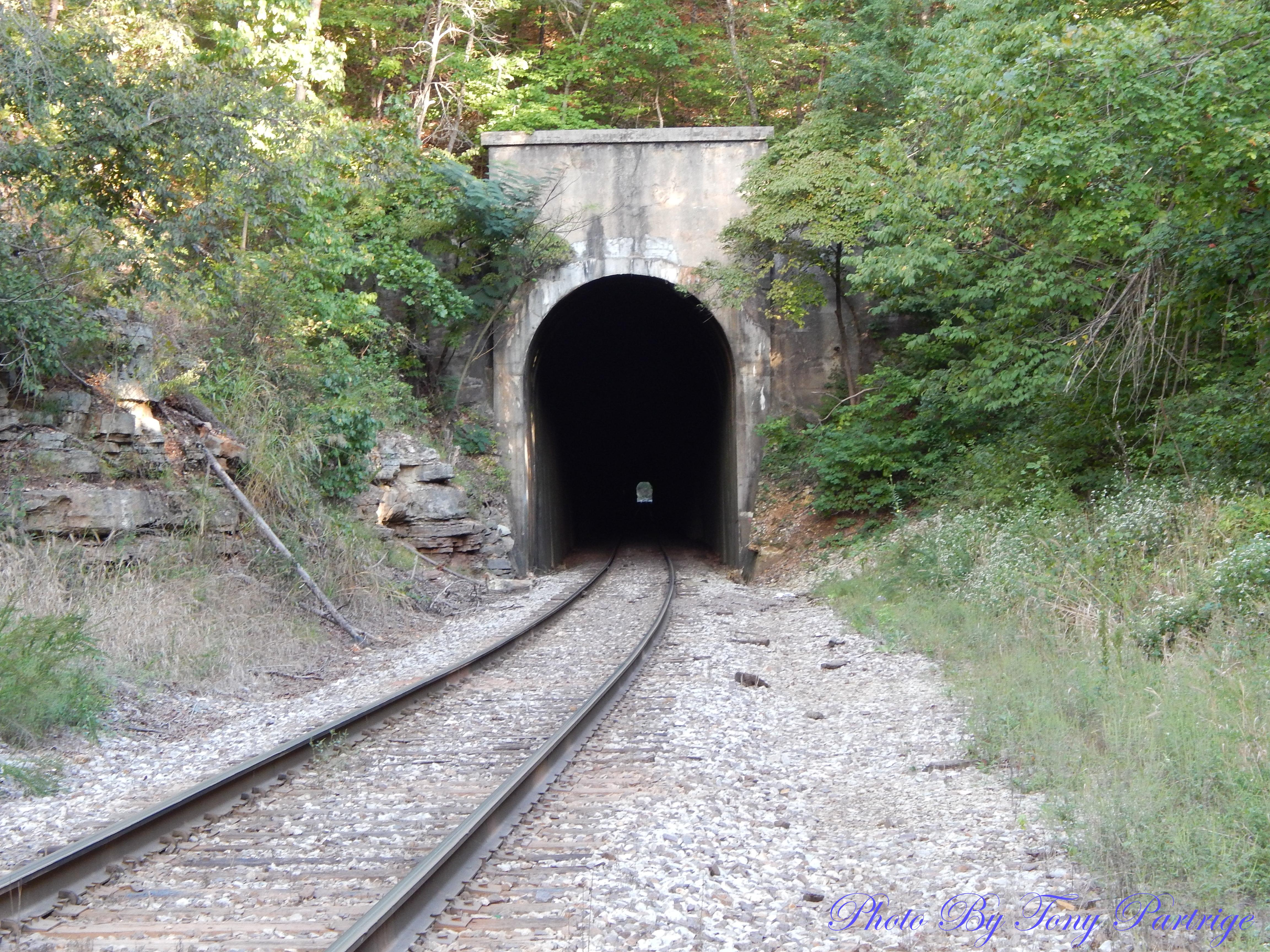

- Location within Arkansas Location within the United States
- Nearest city: Omaha, Arkansas
- Area: 25.5 acres (10.3 ha)
- Built: 1903
- NRHP reference No.: 07000954
- Added to NRHP: September 19, 2007

The Cricket Tunnel and Crest Tunnel are a pair of railroad tunnels in northern Arkansas, near the city of Omaha in Boone County. The Crest Tunnel, at 3,500 feet (1,100 m) is the longest tunnel in Arkansas, and is its only curved tunnel. Both tunnels were built by the White River Division of the Missouri Pacific Railroad in the early 20th century. The tunnels were listed on the National Register of Historic Places in 2007.

== Cricket Tunnel ==
The Cricket Tunnel is oriented roughly northwest to southeast, and passes under Old United States Route 65 south of Omaha. It is 2,657 feet (810 m) long, with a concrete-finished northwestern portal from which retaining walls extend, topped by a projecting cornice. The southeast portal is unfinished, as its opening was excavated out of bedrock. Much of the interior of the tunnel is lined with steel and concrete, as it passes through an area of mud and watery clay.

Both tunnels were built at the same time in 1903-05 by crews of the Missouri Pacific Railroad. Construction of the Cricket Tunnel took longer than anticipated due to the clay encountered, and by a rockslide in the tunnel in September 1904. The concrete lining was added to the tunnel in 1906 amid concerns of continuing rockfalls, and additional work in 1916 removed the top from the southern 500 feet (150 m) of the tunnel.

== Crest Tunnel ==
The Crest Tunnel also runs in a northwest-to-southeast direction, and is located northwest of Omaha, passing under Arkansas Highway 14 east of its junction with US 65. Its northwest portal is unfinished. The tunnel is, at 3,500 feet (1,100 m) in length, the longest in the state. It is also distinctive for a curve near the southwestern portal. It is bored entirely through bedrock.

== See also ==
- National Register of Historic Places listings in Boone County, Arkansas
- List of bridges on the National Register of Historic Places in Arkansas
