= Queen Creek Tunnel =

Highway tunnel in Arizona

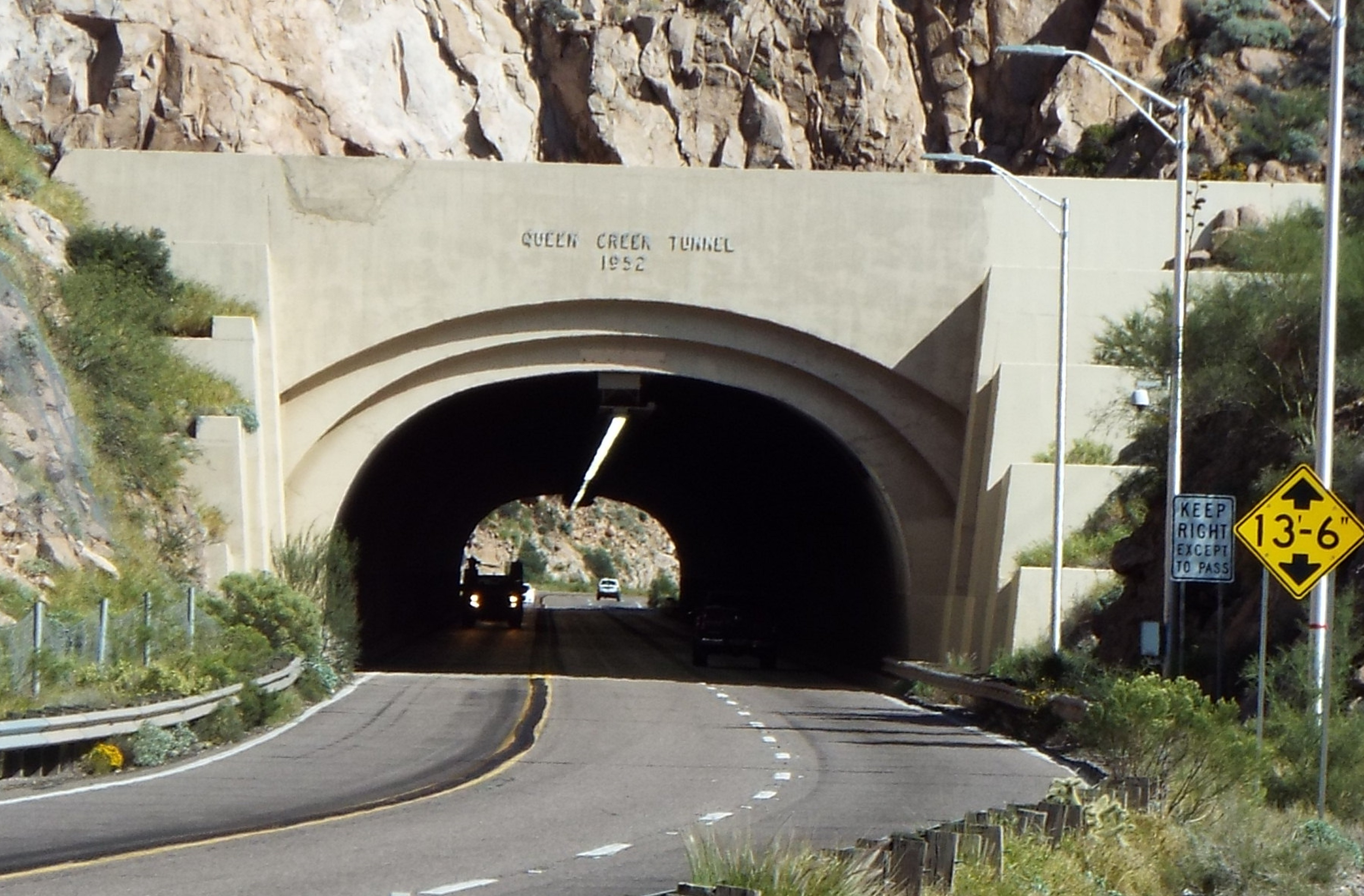
- Interactive map of Queen Creek Tunnel

Overview
- Location: Pinal County, Arizona
- Coordinates: 33.305°N 111.08056°W
- Route: US 60

Operation
- Work began: 1950
- Opened: 1952
- Owner: Arizona Department of Transportation
- Traffic: Automotive
- Vehicles per day: 7060 (2015 daily average)

Technical
- Length: 1,217 ft (371 m)
- No. of lanes: 3
- Tunnel clearance: 22 ft (6.7 m)
- Width: 42 ft (13 m)
- Grade: 6%

The Queen Creek Tunnel is a 1,217-foot-long (371 m) tunnel on US 60 in the Superstition Mountains, just east of Superior, Arizona. Completed in 1952, the Queen Creek Tunnel links Phoenix with Safford by way of Superior and Globe/Miami. It replaced the smaller Claypool Tunnel that had been built in 1926. The new tunnel was cut through the solid rock of the Queen Creek gorge, approximately 3 miles (4.8 km) from the 4,625-foot (1,410 m) mountain summit.. It is 22 feet (6.7 m) in height and 42 feet (13 m) wide at its base. The cost of the tunnel at the time of its construction was $550,000 and it was built by the Fisher Contracting Company.

At the 1952 dedication ceremony, a drill rig used in boring the tunnel was used as a platform for the speakers, other officials, and a brass band. The completion of the tunnel was the final part of an Arizona Highway Department program begun in 1937 to improve the original approximately 20-mile (32 km) section of US 60 between Superior and Miami that was constructed in 1920–22.

The roadbed in the tunnel climbs at a 6% grade, and the original lighting was insufficient to allow motorists good depth perception. The original lighting was improved with the installation of fluorescent lights in the 1960s. Assistance in design of the new lighting was given by Arizona Public Service and the California Division of Highways.

In October 2016, the tunnel lighting system was upgraded to light-emitting diode (LED) technology; it was the first tunnel in Arizona to get LEDs. The lighting system adjusts the lighting level based upon ambient light and weather conditions outside with an adaptive control system. The system offers improved visibility, reduced energy consumption, and lower maintenance.

Arizona Department of Transportation (ADOT) plans to eventually widen US 60 in the area and may bypass the tunnel to avoid the impact of such a project on an environmentally sensitive canyon.
