= Central Midland Railway =

The Central Midland Railway (reporting mark CMR), a division of Progressive Rail Incorporated of Lakeville, Minnesota, was a short line railroad in the U.S. state of Missouri, operating under lease of the former St. Louis Subdivision of the Chicago, Rock Island and Pacific Railroad. CMR operated the easternmost 60 miles (97 km) of the 298-mile (480-km) Rock Island line which used to stretch from St. Louis to Kansas City, Missouri. CMR's operation of the line was performed under two separate leases from the Union Pacific Railroad and the A&K Railroad Materials Corp, respectively, from Overland, Missouri - a suburb of St. Louis, to a location just west of Union, Missouri. CMR's first leased-segment was Union Pacific's "Lackland Subdivision" which extends from "Rock Island Junction" near the intersection of Page Avenue and I-170 in Overland to a location on the north-side of Creve Coeur Lake in Maryland Heights, Missouri, known as "Vigus." The second leased-segment was owned by A&K Railroad Materials and extends from Vigus to just east of Beaufort, Missouri, with active service terminating at Union.

== History ==
The Central Midland was made up of trackage from the former 18th and 19th subdivisions of the Chicago, Rock Island and Pacific Railroad (CRIP). The line was opened in 1904, and cut across the northern Ozark Mountains from St. Louis to Kansas City, Missouri. The entire route was 298 miles (480 km) long, and featured several large bridges, as well as four tunnels.

On March 31, 1980, the Rock Island ceased all operations as a condition of its bankruptcy, and the line was passed into the hands of the Kansas City Terminal Railroad. Soon after, the line was sold as part of a package deal which included the Kansas City to Tucumcari, New Mexico, "Golden State Route" to the St. Louis Southwestern Railway (SSW). SSW originally had plans to rehabilitate the Rock Island across Missouri as a part of its purchase. However, due to years of deferred maintenance by its previous owner, bringing the line up to modern class 1 mainline standards was deemed uneconomical by the SSW. Instead, the company acquired trackage rights to operate its trains over Missouri Pacific Railroad's (now Union Pacific) parallel St. Louis to Kansas City mainline.

SSW never ran a single through-train across Missouri since it acquired the line in 1980, and kept the far eastern segment between Overland, Missouri, to Owensville, Missouri open to local train service only. After the 1993 flood, reopening the line all the way to Kansas City was a possibility SSW briefly looked into, but was quickly decided against given the deteriorated condition of the line and its related infrastructure, combined with the fact that many of the original on-line customers had either closed, moved, or converted to semi-truck for deliveries. From 1993 to 1995, on-line traffic between Owensville and Union declined significantly, and by December 1995, SSW cut train service back further east to Union. SSW then quickly filed a request with the Interstate Commerce Commission (now the Surface Transportation Board) to abandon the route west of Union. However, a lawsuit filed by the "Save The Rock Island Committee" (or "STRICT") resulted in denial of the application, and the rails remained.

In 1996, SSW, which was a subsidiary of the Southern Pacific Railroad, officially merged into the Union Pacific Railroad. The entire St. Louis to Kansas City line was now entirely owned and retained by the Union Pacific. To regulate the route's competitive impact on UP's parallel ex-Missouri Pacific St. Louis to Kansas City main line, UP retained ownership of the extreme east and west ends of the Rock Island; specifically, from "Rock Island Junction" in Overland, Missouri, to "Vigus" in St. Louis County on the east, and between Pleasant Hill and Kansas City on the west. UP then sold the remainder of the line to Ameren, which formed a subsidiary for its railroad known as the "Missouri Central."

Union Pacific leased the operation of its eastern 9 miles (14 km), known as the "Lackland Subdivision" to the CMR from Overland to Vigus. From Vigus on west to Union, A&K Railroad Materials (who purchased the line from Ameren (but not the right-of-way)), leased the operation of Ameren's Missouri Central subsidiary to CMR. Union receives rail service on an as-needed basis. From Beaufort west to Leed's Jct. in Kansas City, the rails have been completely removed. In 2019 Ameren donated and the State of Missouri accepted it to be used as the Rock Island State Park Rail trail.

On March 1, 2022, the CMR officially ceased operations and was taken over by successor Missouri Eastern Railroad, which is a subsidiary to Jaguar Transport Holdings, LLC.

Today Since Progressive Rail chose not to pursue the purchase of the line from either Ameren or A&K, the line was sold in November 2021 to Jaguar Transport Holdings, LLC and will be operated as "Missouri Eastern Railroad".
