= Kaufer =

Kaufer is a surname. Notable people with the surname include:

- Aaron Kaufer, American politician
- Caroline Kaufer, American philanthropist
- David S. Kaufer, American scholar
- Evelin Kaufer, East German sprinter
- Jonathan Kaufer, American film director
- Virág Kaufer, Hungarian politician
- Stephen Kaufer, American entrepreneur
- Stephan A. Kaufer, American philosopher

== See also ==
- 216624 Kaufer, a minor planet
