= Prudential Tunnel =

Tunnel in Boston, Massachusetts

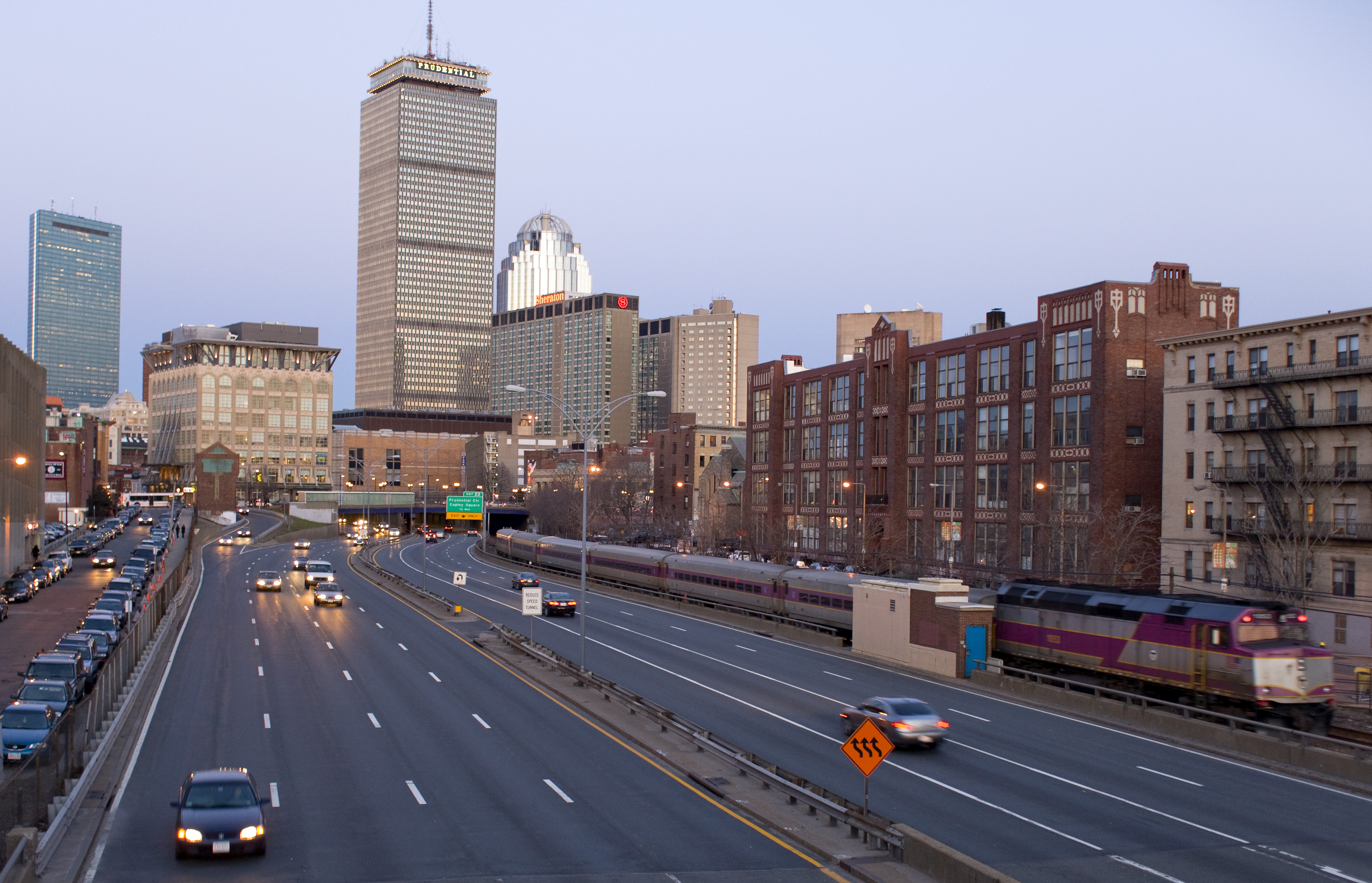
- Entrance to the Prudential Tunnel

Overview
- Location: Boston, Massachusetts
- Coordinates: 42.34752°N 71.08566°W
- Status: Open
- Route: I-90 / Mass Pike

Operation
- Constructed: 1965
- Opened: 1965
- Owner: Commonwealth of Massachusetts
- Operator: Massachusetts Department of Transportation

Technical
- Length: 0.6 mi (0.97 km)
- No. of lanes: 6
- Operating speed: 55 mph (89 km/h)

The Prudential Tunnel is a tunnel through which Interstate 90 (the Massachusetts Turnpike) runs underneath the Prudential Tower complex in Boston. It was created in 1965 as part of the first extension of the Turnpike into Boston.

The tunnel has been criticized for its poor lighting in comparison to the newer O’Neill, Fort Point, and Ted Williams Tunnels.

One exit is contained within the tunnel, the Copley Interchange on the Massachusetts Turnpike.

In 2014, a hole was punched in the wall of the tunnel following an accident involving a large truck.

In 2025, a non-structural piece of concrete fell from the ceiling, causing damage to several cars.
