= ApartmentAdvisor =

Apartment listing search website based in Cambridge, Massachusetts

- Type: Private
- Industry: Internet; Housing
- Founded: 2020; 6 years ago
- Founder: Langley Steinert; Oliver Chrzan; Josh Arnold
- Headquarters: Cambridge, Massachusetts, U.S.
- Website: www.apartmentadvisor.com

ApartmentAdvisor is a Cambridge, Massachusetts-based apartment listings search website that assists users in finding local apartment rentals.

== History ==
The company was founded in 2020 by entrepreneur Langley Steinert, a co-founder of TripAdvisor and the founder of CarGurus with co-founders Oliver Chrzan and Josh Arnold. The rental-search platform was launched in November 2021.

At launch, the company had raised less than $5 million from friends, family and angel investors. Investors included TripAdvisor CEO Stephen Kaufer, former TripAdvisor and CarGurus chief technology officer Nick Shanny, and Boston Scientific co-founder Pete Nicholas.

== Business ==
ApartmentAdvisor assists renters in finding apartments available to rent. The company also regularly publishes rent trend data and insights in its National Rent Report as well as other studies and reports which are frequently cited by the media.
