= Stephan A. Kaufer =

American philosopher

- Stephan Käufer
- Occupations: Philosopher; Professor

Education
- Education: Yale College (BA, 1991), Stanford University (PhD, 1999)

Philosophical work
- Era: Contemporary philosophy
- Region: Western philosophy
- School: Continental philosophy
- Institutions: Franklin & Marshall College
- Language: English
- Main interests: Phenomenology; Martin Heidegger; Philosophy of logic
- Notable works: Phenomenology: An Introduction; "On Heidegger on Logic"

Stephan A. Kaufer is an American philosopher and John Williamson Nevin Memorial Professor of Philosophy at Franklin & Marshall College. His primary research interest is Martin Heidegger and early Heideggerian themes, especially issues concerning logic, temporality, and the philosophy of life. He has also written on the history of logic and the neo-Kantian background to twentieth-century continental thought.

== Books ==
- Phenomenology: An Introduction (with Anthony Chemero) — 2nd ed., Wiley, 2023.
