= Langley Steinert =

American entrepreneur and business executive, founder of CarGurus and Tripadvisor

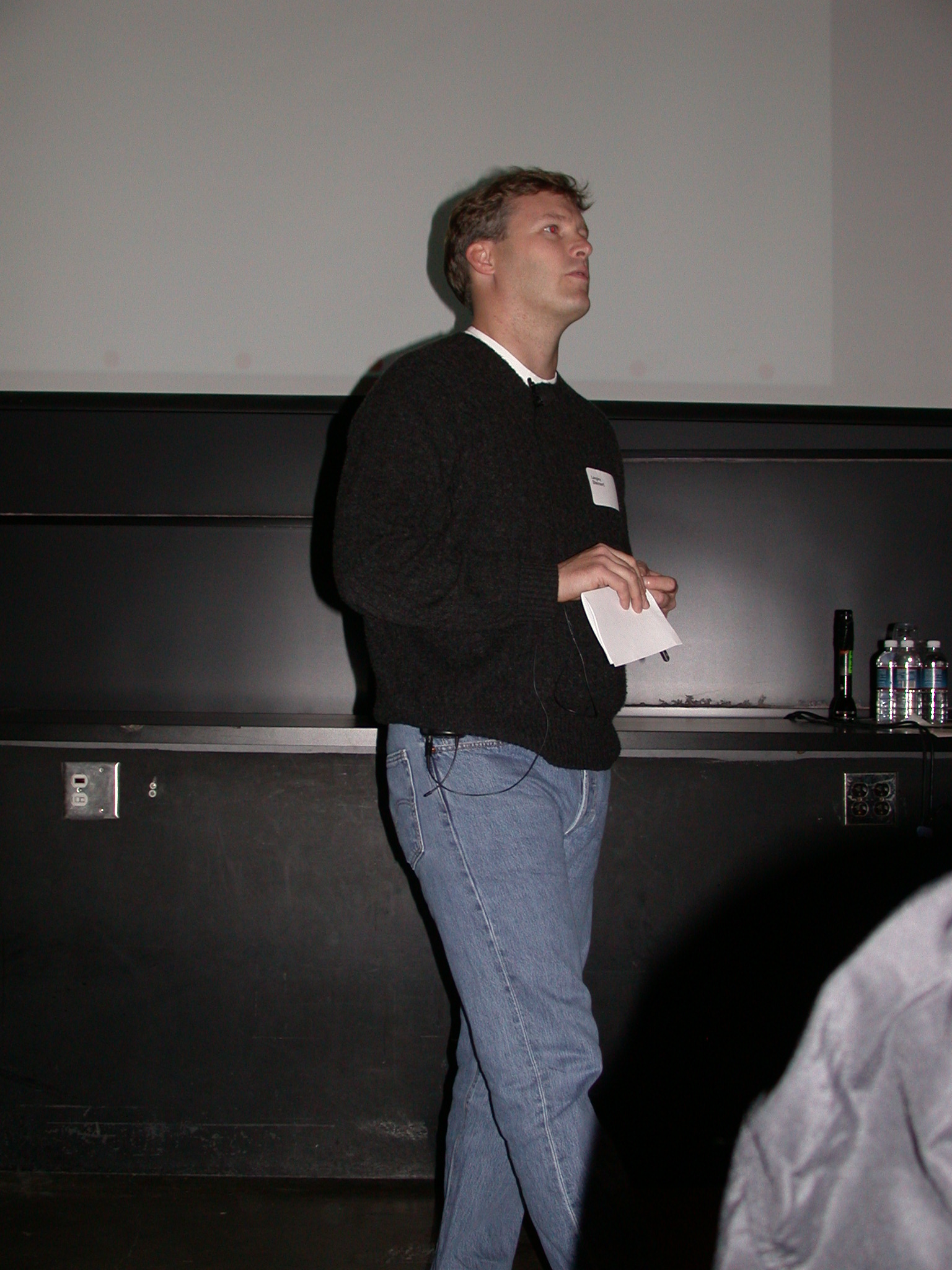
- Steinert at Harvard University, 2005
- Born: 1963 (age 62–63); Concord, United States
- Education: Tuck School of Business (MBA); Georgetown University (BA)
- Occupation: Entrepreneur
- Years active: 2000-present
- Title: Founder and former Chairman of Tripadvisor; Founder and Chairman of CarGurus; Founder and Chairman of ApartmentAdvisor

Langley Steinert (born 1963) is an American entrepreneur and business executive. He is most notable for being a founder of CarGurus and being a co-founder Tripadvisor along with Stephen Kaufer.

Steinert has been estimated to have a Net worth of US$522 million as of 2021.

== Education ==
Steinert attended Georgetown University from 1981 until 1985, finishing with a Bachelor's degree in Economics. From 1989 until 1991 he attended Tuck School of Business earning his Master of Business Administration.

== Career ==
=== Early career ===
After graduating from business school, Steinert spent three years from 1991 until 1994 as a product manager at the now defunct Lotus Development. After his stay at Lotus, he later spent three years at Papyrus and then spent another two years at Viaweb, joining as the fifth employee of the company. Steinert then became a partner at the venture capital company Flagship Pioneering (then Flagship Ventures), where he then met Stephen Kaufer, who he would later co-found Tripadvisor with.

=== Tripadvisor ===
Steinert along with Kaufer, raised US$4.5 million from family and friends to later found their company Tripadvisor, a company that utilizes user-generated reviews for places such as Hotels, Museums and Restaurants, in February 2000. He later stepped down as chairman of the company in February 2006 to found his new company CarGurus.

=== CarGurus ===
Steinert founded the company CarGurus, a company that assists users in comparing local listings for used and new cars, and contacting sellers, in January 2006. Steinert served as CEO of the company until 2021, when he stepped down and was replaced with former CFO of the company, Jason Trevisan.

=== ApartmentAdvisor ===
In 2021, along with Josh Arnold and Oliver Chrzan, Steinert founded the company ApartmentAdvisor, a search website that helps users find apartment rentals.
