= PistonHeads =

Motoring website and forum

- Website type: Automotive Website
- Headquarters: London, {{{location_country}}}
- Owner: CarGurus
- Founder: David Edmonston
- Website: www.pistonheads.com
- Launched: December 27, 1998; 27 years ago
- Current status: Active

PistonHeads is a London, UK based online motoring community and premium car marketplace, featuring the latest automotive news and reviews, active discussion forums and premium cars for sale.

== History ==
PistonHeads was founded in 1998 by David Edmonston. Originally petrolheads.co.uk, PistonHeads disrupted traditional print publishing and was one of the first to bring automotive news online.

Hailed as the Mumsnet for men by The Times, the forums were born as a base for car enthusiasts in London to meet to talk about cars and quickly grew to be the largest online motoring community in the UK.

The classifieds were originally created as a tool for members to sell cars to each other amongst trustworthy enthusiasts.

Founder David Edmonston sold PistonHeads to Haymarket Media Group in 2007 for an undisclosed sum.

CarGurus acquired PistonHeads in 2019.

== Business ==
PistonHeads is known for its online motoring community, editorial tone, used car marketplace and auction platform.

Owned by CarGurus, PistonHeads operates as an independent brand, maintaining its popular forums and editorial content, while applying CarGurus’ technology to enhance the classifieds and site experience.

== See also ==
- List of Internet forums
