= Anthony Chemero =

American Philosopher

Anthony Chemero is Professor of Philosophy and Connected Computing at Vanderbilt University. Before this, he was Distinguished Research Professor of Philosophy and Psychology at the University of Cincinnati. He also served as a primary member of the Center for Cognition, Action, and Perception (CAP) and the Strange Tools Research Lab (STRL).

Chemero's research is both philosophical and empirical, with a focus on nonlinear dynamical modeling, ecological psychology, complex systems, phenomenology, and social cognition. He is the author of more than 100 articles and the books Intertwined Creatures: The Embodied Cognitive Science of Self and Other (2026, Columbia University Press), Radical Embodied Cognitive Science (2009, MIT Press), and Phenomenology: An introduction (2015/2023, Polity; with Stephan Käufer ). His first book was a finalist for the Lakatos Prize for Philosophy of Science.

He has recently received the Richard M. Shiffrin Distinguished Alumni Award from Indiana University (2026), The Graduate Student Mentor Award from Student Success at the University of Cincinnati (2026), the Rieveschl Award for Creative/Scholarly Activity (2022), and the University Distinguished Research Award, the Latino Faculty Association Excellence in Research Award (2019).

Chemero received his Ph.D. in philosophy and cognitive science from Indiana University in 1999. From then until 2012, he taught at Franklin & Marshall College (F&M), where he was Professor of Psychology. He then taught as Distinguished Research Professor of Philosophy and Psychology at the University of Cincinnati. In the Fall of 2026, Chemero became Professor of Philosophy and Connected Computing at Vanderbilt University.

== Publications ==
=== Books ===
- Chemero, A. (2026). Intertwined Creatures: The Embodied Cognitive Science of Self and Other. Columbia University Press
- Kaufer, Stephan and A. Chemero. (2015) Phenomenology: An Introduction 2nd ed., Wiley
- Chemero, A. (2009). Radical embodied cognitive science. MIT Press.
- M. Heras Escribano and A. Chemero, (eds.) (2026). Selected Writings of Edward S. Reed, Routledge.
- Di Paolo, E. A., Chemero, A., Heras-Escribano, M., McGann, M., (eds.) (2021). Enaction and Ecological Psychology: Convergences and Complementarities. Frontiers Media SA.

=== Select Articles ===
- M. Gastelum, A. Chemero, and V. Raja, “Places for reasoning”, Philosophical Transactions of the Royal Society B, 2024.
- A. Chemero, “LLMs differ from human cognition because they are not embodied”, Nature Human Behavior, 2023, https://rdcu.be/drzoz.
- V. Raja, D. Villuri, E. Baggs, A. Chemero, and M. Anderson, The Markov blanket trick: On the scope of the free energy principle and active inference”, target article with commentary, Physics of Life Reviews, 2021.
- L. Cecutti*, A. Chemero, and S. Lee, “Technology may change cognition without necessarily harming it, Nature Human Behavior, 2021. https://doi.org/10.1038/s41562-021-01162-0
- P. Nalepka, P. Silva, R. Kallen, K. Shockley, A. Chemero, E. Saltzman, M. Richardson, “Task dynamics define the contextual emergence of human corralling behavior”, PLOSOne, https://doi.org/10.1371/journal.pone.0260046, 2021.
- V. Raja and A. Chemero, “In defense of impropriety” (Commentary on Heras-Escribano), Constructivist Foundations, 15, 213-2162, 2020
- G. Sanches de Oliveira*, V. Raja*, and A. Chemero, “Radical embodied cognitive science and ‘real thinking’, Synthese, 2019, https://doi.org/10.1007/s11229-019-02475-4
- P. Nalepka*, M. Lamb, R. Kallen, K. Shockley, A. Chemero, E. Saltzman, and M. Richardson, “Employing human social-motor for robust human-machine interaction: A dyadic shepherding example”, Proceedings of the National Academy of the Sciences of the United States of America, 2019, https://doi.org/10.1073/pnas.1813164116
- E. Baggs and A. Chemero, “Radical embodiment in two directions”, Synthese, 2018, https://doi.org/10.1007/s11229-018-02020-9.
- D. van der Schiff, A. Schiavio, A. Walton*, V. Velardo, and A. Chemero, “Musical creativity and the embodied mind: Exploring the possibilities of 4E cognition and dynamical systems theory”, Music and Science,https://doi.org/10.1177/2059204318792319, 2018.
- J. Bruineberg*, A. Chemero, E. Rietveld, “General ecological information supports engagement with affordances for ‘higher’ cognition”, Synthese, https://doi.org/10.1007/s11229-018-1716-9, 2018.
- A. Walton*, A. Washburn*, P. Langland-Hassan, A. Chemero, H. Kloos, and M. Richardson, “Creating time: Social collaboration in music improvisation”, Topics in Cognitive Science, 10, 95-119, 10.1111/tops.12306, 2018.
- C. Baber, A. Chemero, and J. Hall, “What the jeweller’s hand tells the jeweller’s brain: Tool use, creativity, and embodied cognition”, Philosophy and Technology, https://doi.org/10.1007/s13347-0170292-0, 2018.
- P. Nalepka*, R. Kallen, E. Saltzman. A. Chemero, and M. Richardson, “Emergent multiagent coordination and behavioral mode switching”, Psychological Science, 28, 630-650, 2017.
- A. Chemero, “Sensorimotor Empathy”, Journal of Consciousness Studies, 23, 5-6, 138-152, 2016.
- A. Walton*, M. Richardson, P. Langland-Hassan, and A. Chemero, “Improvisation and the self-organization of multiple musical bodies”, Frontiers in Psychology, doi: 10.3389/fpsyg.2015.00313, 2015.
- A. Chemero, “Antyreprezentacjonizm i nastawienie dynamicizne”, Przegląd-filozoficzno-literacki, 2, 79107, 2014. (Polish translation of “Anti-representationalism and the dynamical stance” for special issue on “Classic Papers on Representation”. Translated by P. Gładziejewski.)
- M. Silberstein and A. Chemero, “Constraints on Localization and Decomposition as Explanatory Strategies in the Biological Sciences”, Philosophy of Science, 80, 958-970, 2013.
- M. Anderson and A. Chemero, “The problem with brain GUTS”, Behavioral and Brain Sciences, 36, 204-5, 2013.
- M. Anderson, M. Richardson, and A. Chemero, “Eroding the boundaries of cognition: Implications of embodiment”, Topics in Cognitive Science, 4, 717-730, 2012.
- C. Heyser and A. Chemero, “Novel Object Exploration in Mice”, Behavioural Processes, 89, 232-238, 2012.
- M. Silberstein and A. Chemero, “Complexity and Extended Phenomenological-Cognitive Systems”, Topics in Cognitive Science, 4, 35-50, 2012. (Target article, appears with peer commentary)
- N. Stepp*, A. Chemero, and M. Turvey, "Philosophy of the Rest of Cognitive Science", Topics in Cognitive Science, 3, 425-437, 2011.
- D. Dotov*, L. Nie*, and A. Chemero, “A Demonstration of the Transition from Readiness-to-hand to Unreadiness-to-hand”, PLoS ONE 5(3): e9433. doi:10.1371/journal.pone.0009433, 2010.
- R. Dale, E. Dietrich, and A. Chemero, “Pluralism in the Cognitive Sciences”, Cognitive Science, 33, 739-742, 2009.
- A. Chemero and M. Silberstein, “After the Philosophy of Mind”, Philosophy of Science, 75, 1-27, 2008.
- A. Chemero and M. Turvey, “Autonomy and Hypersets”, BioSystems, 91, 320-330, 2008.
- A. Chemero and M. Turvey, “Gibsonian Affordances for Roboticists”, Adaptive Behavior, 15, 473-480, 2007.
- A. Chemero and M. Turvey, “Hypersets, Complexity, and the Ecological Approach to Perception-Action”, Biological Theory, 2, 23-36, 2007.
- A. Chemero and C. Heyser, “Object Exploration and a Problem with Reductionism”, Synthese, 147, 3, 403423, 2005.
- A. Chemero, “An Outline of a Theory of Affordances”, Ecological Psychology, 15, 2, 181-195, 2003.
- A. Chemero, “Dynamical Explanation and Mental Representation”, Trends in Cognitive Science, 5, 4, 140141, 2001.
- A. Chemero, “What We Perceive When We Perceive Affordances”, Ecological Psychology, 13, 2, 111116, 2001.
- A. Chemero, “Anti-representationalism and the Dynamical Stance”, Philosophy of Science, 67, 4, 625-647, 2000.
