= Stephen Kaufer =

American businessman (born 1962)

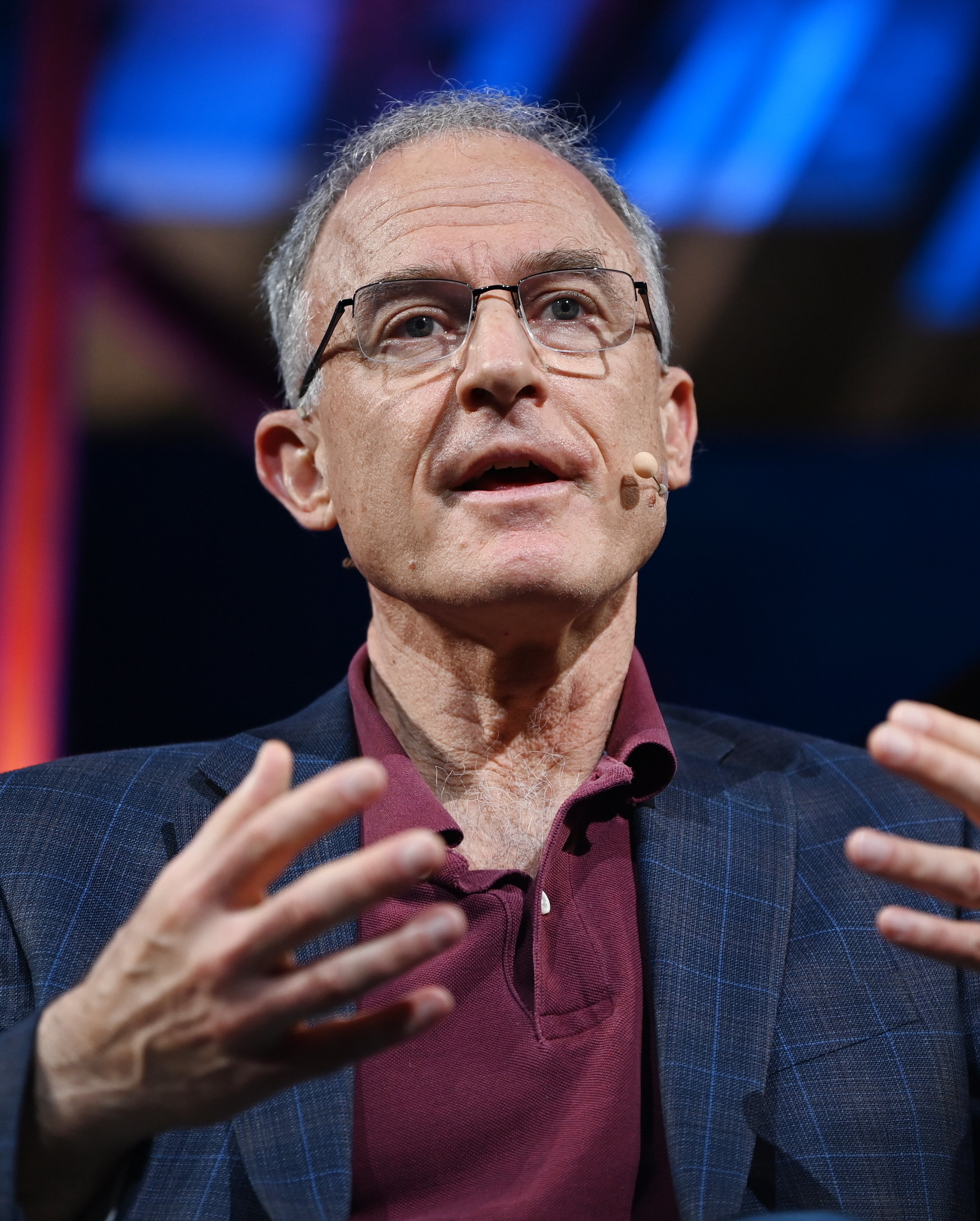
- Kaufer in 2021
- Born: September 7, 1962; Hollywood, California, U.S.
- Education: Harvard University (BA)
- Occupation: Businessman
- Years active: 1985–2022
- Known for: Co-founder and former CEO, TripAdvisor
- Spouse: Caroline
- Children: 4

Stephen Kaufer (born September 7, 1962) is an American businessman who co-founded the travel services company TripAdvisor. Kaufer launched TripAdvisor in 2000 with Langley Steinert. He served as the company’s president and chief executive officer until his retirement in 2022.

== Early life and education ==
Kaufer was born in Hollywood, California. His father was a trial lawyer who had grown up in an Orthodox Jewish household but raised his children in a Reform Jewish culture. His mother was disabled by multiple sclerosis and died when he was in his early 20s. He fenced in high school, competed in the Junior Olympics at age 16, and was the captain of the fencing team at Harvard. While there, he majored in computer science.

== Career ==
=== Early career ===
In 1985, Kaufer co-founded CenterLine Software, a company that developed programming and testing tools for software developers. In 1998, he and his co-owners sold half of the company’s assets to Rational Software. The remaining assets became CenterLine Development Systems, which was headed by his wife, Caroline Kaufer.

=== TripAdvisor ===
In 1998, while planning a vacation, Kaufer struggled to find unbiased information and candid opinions about specific hotels. Caroline suggested that he build a website to help other travelers, but he did not act on the idea for over a year.

He launched the site a few years later. Initially, the company followed a business-to-business model, partnering with other travel-related websites rather than engaging directly with travelers. Kaufer later adopted a consumer-focused model, making TripAdvisor publicly accessible, aggregating information on hotels and attractions, encouraging user reviews, and structuring contracts that generated revenue through referral fees from travel companies.

As the company expanded, Kaufer remained in leadership roles, declining a proposed sale to Yahoo and later overseeing TripAdvisor through a $210 million sale to IAC/InterActiveCorp in 2011. As of 2022, the site attracted more than 400 million visitors per month. In 2022, Kaufer retired after 22 years as TripAdvisor's CEO.

== Personal life ==
Kaufer's wife died from pancreatic neuroendocrine cancer in 2005 at age 42, leaving Kaufer with four children, then aged 13, 12, 7, and 5. In 2012, he remarried a woman with four kids of her own.

Through the Stephen and Caroline Kaufer Fund for Neuroendocrine Research, and through contributions to the Caring for Carcinoid Foundation, Kaufer has supported medical research related to his wife's illness.
