= Fort Point Channel Tunnel =

- Interactive map of Fort Point Channel Tunnel

Overview
- Location: Boston, Massachusetts, U.S.
- Coordinates: 42.3470°N 71.0547°W
- Status: Open
- Route: I-90 / Mass Pike
- Crosses: Fort Point Channel

Operation
- Owner: Commonwealth of Massachusetts
- Operator: Massachusetts Department of Transportation
- Traffic: Automotive

Technical
- No. of lanes: 4
- Operating speed: 45 mph (72 km/h)

The Fort Point Channel Tunnel is a tunnel in Boston, Massachusetts, United States. It carries the Massachusetts Turnpike (Interstate 90) underneath the Fort Point Channel and South Boston streets.

== History ==
The tunnel was built during 1991–1994 as part of the Big Dig. It was built using a casting basin.

In July 2006, a ceiling tile and associated debris weighing 26 short tons (52,000 lb; 24,000 kg) collapsed, causing the death of a passenger in a vehicle in the tunnel and severe injury to the driver. This incident and the resulting inspections and repairs delayed the Big Dig construction project by a year.
