= Caroline Kaufer =

American business executive and philanthropist (1962–2005)

- Born: Caroline Lipson; August 4, 1962
- Died: March 22, 2005 (aged 42)
- Education: Harvard University
- Occupation: Business executive

Caroline Kaufer (née Lipson; August 4, 1962 – March 22, 2005) was an executive of a software development company, Centerline Development Systems, and a philanthropist, especially for research into neuroendocrine cancer, the disease from which she died. Before her death, Mrs. Kaufer and her husband Stephen Kaufer gave $1.05 million to the Dana–Farber Cancer Institute to fund research of this rare disease. They also donated $250,000 to the Massachusetts General Hospital for similar research. The Stephen and Caroline Kaufer Fund for Neuroendocrine Research continues to support medical research around the world.

Kaufer was a graduate of Newton South High School (class of 1980), Harvard College (class of 1984) and Harvard Business School (class of 1988). She was head of Centerline Development Systems, based in Newton. Her husband managed and was co-founder of TripAdvisor. The money that they donated has been used for research at, among other places, Dana–Farber Cancer Institute, Massachusetts General Hospital and Stanford University.
