= CarGurus =

Car shopping and research website based in Cambridge, Massachusetts

CarGurus, Inc.

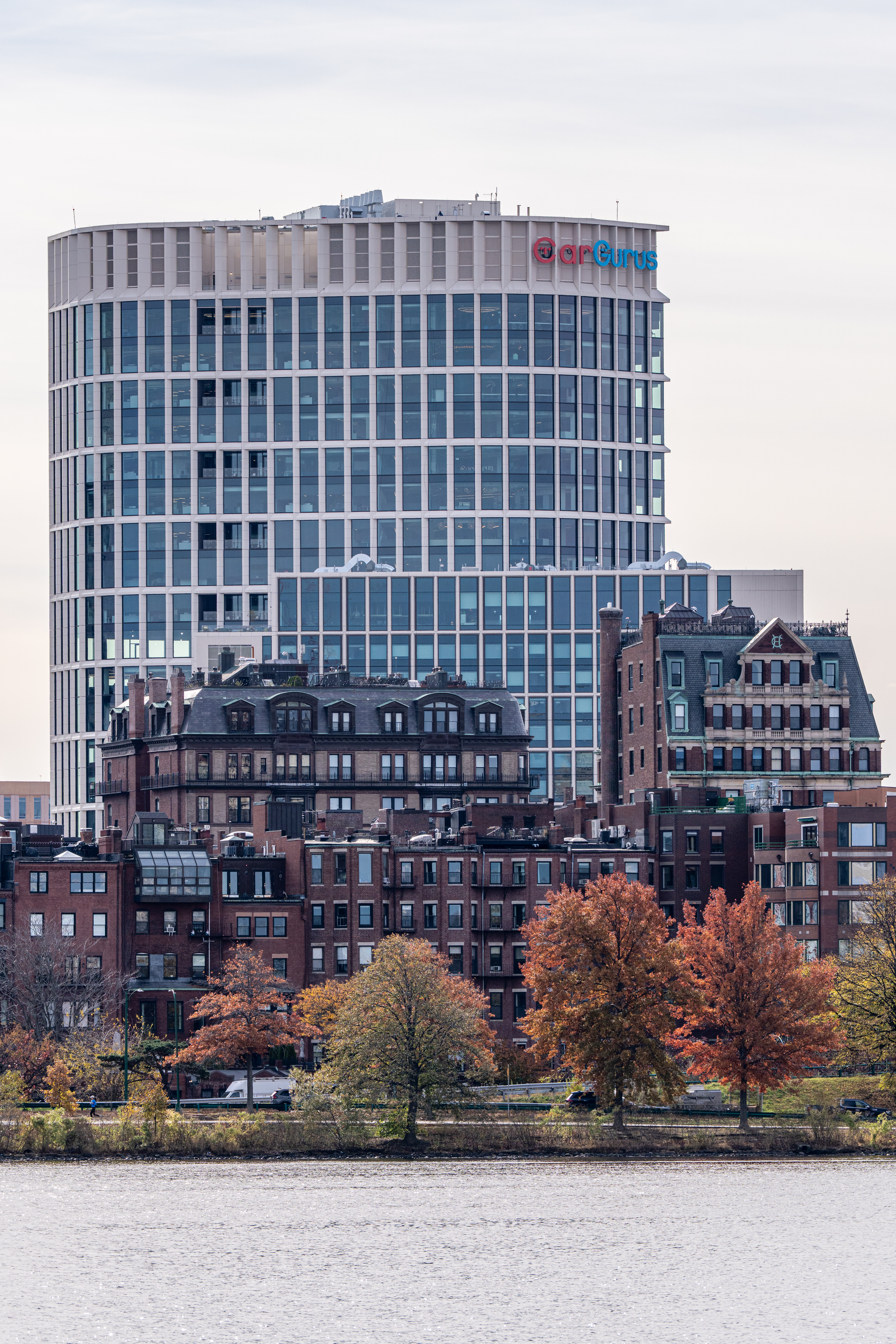
- Headquarters in Boston
- Type: Public
- Traded as: Nasdaq: CARG (Class A); Russell 2000 Component; S&P 600 Component
- Industry: Internet; Automotive
- Founded: 2006; 20 years ago
- Founder: Langley Steinert
- Headquarters: Boston, Massachusetts, U.S.
- Key people: Jason Trevisan (CEO); Langley Steinert (Founder)
- Revenue: ▲US$907 million (2025)
- Net income: ▲US$156 million (2025)
- Website: cargurus.com

CarGurus, Inc. is a Boston-based automotive research and shopping website operating in the U.S., U.K., and Canada that assists consumers and auto dealers in comparing local listings for used and new cars and contacting sellers. Its platform provides vehicle listings, pricing, pricing and dealer information, and tools for researching and financing vehicle purchases.

== History ==
CarGurus was founded in 2006 by Langley Steinert, a co-founder of TripAdvisor. Langley Steinert served as the company's chief executive officer until January 2021, when he became executive chair and was succeeded as CEO by Jason Trevisan, the company's former chief financial officer. The company began as an automotive community blog where consumers could post reviews and questions about local dealers, shops, and types of cars. Dealers expressed interest in advertising on the site, and the company changed its business strategy to connect dealers and consumers by putting inventory on the site along with "Deal Ratings" to help shoppers understand if they were getting a good deal.

The company avoided institutional venture capital because it reached positive cash flow early. It started with roughly $4 million raised in a friends-and-family round and later took money from mutual funds. Revenue rose from $98.6 million in 2015, a year in which the company lost $1.6 million, to $198.1 million in 2016 with a profit of $6.5 million.

From 2009 to 2011, the company's visitor traffic increased from 9 million per month to 21 million per month. Today, CarGurus is one of the most visited automotive shopping websites in the United States, with over 40 million monthly visitors.

In March 2016 the company announced that its European headquarters would be in Dublin, its first office outside the United States, with 100 positions to be added over three years and operations due to begin that June. The site was intended to house inside sales, dealer account services and technical development staff building country-specific operations across Europe. CarGurus was brought to Ireland through ConnectIreland, a state-backed scheme that paid intermediaries for introducing foreign employers.

CarGurus was privately owned until its $150 million IPO on October 12, 2017. The shares were priced at $16 and closed their first session at $27.58, about 72% above the offering price. More than 40,000 dealerships were using the platform at the time, a figure Trevisan described as over 90% of dealers in the country, under a freemium arrangement in which the company charged subscriptions rather than taking a share of each sale. CarGurus said it would direct the proceeds towards entering markets beyond Canada, the United Kingdom and Germany and towards hiring engineering staff.

In 2018, CarGurus purchased the UK website and forum PistonHeads for an undisclosed amount.

In 2019, CarGurus announced a partnership with Capital One Auto Financing to integrate vehicle financing prequalifications into its online marketplace for participating dealerships. In 2024, they furthered their partnership with services from Chase Auto.

In January 2020, CarGurus purchased US auto listings site Autolist. In April 2020 the company said it would wind down its businesses in Germany, Spain and Italy and treat the United Kingdom and Canada as its only international markets, while also shelving entry into any further territories. It attributed the retrenchment to trading conditions during the COVID-19 pandemic and said the resources released would go into product work in the two remaining markets.

Later in 2020, CarGurus purchased a 51% stake in wholesale vehicle platform CarOffer, subsequently acquiring the remaining stake in 2023. At the end of 2025, CarGurus completed a wind-down of CarOffer, removing a long-standing drag on profitability.

In September 2026 the company named Matthew Mandel chief financial officer with effect from 19 October 2026. Trevisan, who had been acting as principal financial and accounting officer, gave up those duties on that date and remained chief executive. Mandel arrived from the fleet software firm Fleetio, where he had been chief financial and operating officer since November 2023, and had earlier worked at the beverage technology company Cometeer, serving as co-chief executive during 2023, at Wayfair between 2017 and 2020, and as a vice-president at the private equity firm Advent International.

== Business ==
CarGurus is an automotive research and shopping website that assists users in comparing local listings for used and new cars and contacting dealerships. CarGurus uses algorithms to analyze and compare prices and features on cars for sale. Users can search for specific cars in their local area and compare listings by price, features, and dealership reputation. The company operates websites in the United States, Canada, the United Kingdom.

The company's board of directors includes Steve Kaufer, co-founder and former CEO of TripAdvisor; Greg Schwartz, President Media and Marketplace of Zillow; Steve Conine, Co-founder of Wayfair; Lori Hickok, former EVP, Chief Financial and Development Officer for Scripps Networks Interactive; and Manik Gupta, Corporate VP, Microsoft Teams at Microsoft Corporation. Full-year 2025 gross profit hit $841.5 million.

On 15 October 2026 the New York City Department of Consumer and Worker Protection sued CarGurus in the New York State Supreme Court, alleging that its price ratings presented vehicles as bargains while compulsory fees, deposit requirements and trade-in conditions appeared elsewhere in the listing. The department said it had counted more than 2,000 breaches of the municipal consumer protection law and asked the court to halt the practices permanently and levy civil penalties. It also objected to the company's AI assistant, which it said assembled lists of purported bargains without carrying the dealers' qualifying text. By way of illustration the department pointed to a listing from June for a 2018 Honda that was shown as $2,212 below market value but which, once the itemised charges were counted, exceeded market value by $1,473.

CarGurus rejected the allegations. Trevisan said the complaint disregarded the company's record on pricing disclosure and that it would contest the case, noting that its ratings cover the full range of assessments including overpriced listings, and that the site also shows price histories, time on the market, verified dealer reviews and vehicle history reports. The suit followed a policy change announced in June 2026 and applied from 14 July, under which used vehicle listings without disclosed fees lost their rating and fell in search results; at the end of July the company said more than 90% of used stock from subscribing dealers carried fee disclosures. The department contended that the rules had not been applied consistently.

== Recognition ==
CarGurus ranked on the Inc. 500 Fastest Growing Private Companies in 2011, 2012, and 2013, and the Inc. 5000 in 2014, 2015, and 2016. The company was also named to Forbes' Most Promising Companies list in 2015.

== Partnerships ==
In 2025, CarGurus became a founding partner of Boston Common Golf—part of Fenway Sports Group and one of six inaugural teams in TGL, a league that combines virtual simulation with live-action play. The team features major champions Rory McIlroy, Hideki Matsuyama, Adam Scott, and Keegan Bradley.
