= List of bridges documented by the Historic American Engineering Record in West Virginia =

This is a list of bridges documented by the Historic American Engineering Record in the U.S. state of West Virginia.

== Bridges ==
Survey No.	Name (as assigned by HAER)	Status	Type	Built	Documented	Carries	Crosses	Location	County	Coordinates
MD-16	Baltimore and Ohio Railroad, Harpers Ferry Bridge Piers	Ruin		1836	1970	Former Baltimore and Ohio Railroad	Potomac River	Harpers Ferry, West Virginia, and Maryland Heights, Maryland	Jefferson County, West Virginia, and Washington County, Maryland	39°19′25″N 77°43′38″W
WV-2	Wheeling Suspension Bridge	Extant	Suspension	1849	1987	US 40 (former)	Ohio River	Wheeling	Ohio	40°04′13″N 80°43′38″W
WV-8	Barrackville Covered Bridge	Extant	Burr truss	1853	1972	Pike Street	Buffalo Creek	Barrackville	Marion	39°30′21″N 80°10′05″W
WV-11	Northwestern Virginia Railroad, Grafton Bridge	Replaced	Fink truss	1854	1972	North Western Virginia Railroad	Tygart Valley River	Grafton	Taylor	39°20′22″N 80°01′26″W
WV-12	Baltimore and Ohio Railroad, Parkersburg Bridge	Extant	Parker truss	1871	1973	CSX Transportation	Ohio River	Parkersburg, West Virginia, and Belpre, Ohio	Wood County, West Virginia, and Washington County, Ohio	39°16′15″N 81°33′56″W
WV-13	Baltimore and Ohio Railroad, Rowelsburg Bridge	Extant	Warren truss	1910	1974	Former Baltimore and Ohio Railroad	Cheat River	Rowlesburg	Preston	39°20′54″N 79°39′58″W
WV-14	Baltimore and Ohio Railroad, Fairmont Bridge	Extant	Pratt truss	1912	1972	CSX Fairmont Subdivision	Monongahela River	Fairmont	Marion	39°28′00″N 80°08′52″W
WV-15	Baltimore and Ohio Railroad, Benwood Bridge	Extant	Parker truss	1870	1974	Former Baltimore and Ohio Railroad	Ohio River	Benwood, West Virginia, and Bellaire, Ohio	Marshall County, West Virginia, and Belmont County, Ohio	40°00′43″N 80°44′22″W
WV-18	Baltimore and Ohio Railroad, Tray Run Viaduct	Replaced	Trestle	1905	1974	Former Baltimore and Ohio Railroad	Tray Run	Rowlesburg	Preston	39°21′29″N 79°41′40″W
WV-20	Baltimore and Ohio Railroad, Cacapon River Viaduct	Extant	Stone arch	1910	1971	Former Baltimore and Ohio Railroad	Cacapon River	Great Cacapon	Morgan	39°37′12″N 78°16′58″W
WV-23	Bridgeport Lamp Chimney Company, Simpson Creek Bridge	Extant	Reinforced concrete through arch	1924	1984		Simpson Creek	Bridgeport	Harrison	39°17′03″N 80°15′21″W
WV-25	Bridgeport Bridge	Replaced	Pratt truss	1893	1988	US 40 (former)	Ohio River back channel	Wheeling, West Virginia, and Bridgeport, Ohio	Ohio County, West Virginia, and Belmont County, Ohio	40°04′21″N 80°44′19″W
WV-31	Staats Mill Covered Bridge	Relocated	Howe truss	1882	1982		Tug Fork of Mill Creek	Ripley	Jackson	38°47′41″N 81°41′13″W
WV-32	Milton Covered Bridge	Relocated	Howe truss	1876	1975	CR 25	Mud River	Milton	Cabell	38°25′40″N 82°08′04″W
WV-34	Baltimore and Ohio Railroad, Stone Bridges 1 and 2	Extant	Stone arch	1909	1987	Former Baltimore and Ohio Railroad	Little Buffalo Creek	Gassaway	Braxton	38°39′19″N 80°45′40″W
WV-41	New River Gorge Bridge	Extant	Steel arch	1977	1988	US 19	New River	Fayetteville	Fayette	38°04′06″N 81°05′00″W
WV-44	East Street Bridge	Replaced	Pennsylvania truss	1907	1992	WV 14 Alt.	Little Kanawha River	Parkersburg	Wood	39°15′31″N 81°32′47″W
WV-46	Chelyan Bridge	Replaced	Cantilever	1929	1993	WV 61 Spur	Kanawha River	Chelyan	Wood	38°11′52″N 81°29′47″W
WV-53	White's Creek Covered Bridge Abutments	Ruin		1877	1992	Big Sandy River Road	White's Creek	Cyrus	Wayne	38°18′33″N 82°34′16″W
WV-54	Cyrus Bridge	Ruin	Reinforced concrete cast-in-place slab	1918	1992	Norfolk and Western Railway	White's Creek tributary	Cyrus	Wayne	
WV-55	Cotton Hill Station Bridge	Replaced	Pratt truss	1927	1995	WV 16	New River	Cotton Hill	Fayette	38°06′50″N 81°08′37″W
WV-63	Gilbert Bridge	Replaced	Parker truss	1925	1995	US 52	Guyandotte River	Gilbert	Mingo	37°36′49″N 81°52′03″W
WV-60	Fayette Station Bridge	Extant	Pennsylvania truss	1889		CR 82	New River	Fayette	Fayette	38°03′48″N 81°04′24″W
WV-62	Water Street Bridge	Replaced	Parker truss	1934	1995	CR 119/26	Guyandotte River	Logan	Logan	37°50′56″N 81°59′48″W
WV-64	Easley Bridge	Demolished	Warren truss	1936	1997	Poplar Street	Norfolk Southern Railway	Bluefield	Mercer	37°15′51″N 81°14′24″W
WV-65	"S" Bridge	Demolished	Warren truss	1935	1996	US 40	Little Wheeling Creek	Elm Grove	Ohio	40°02′51″N 80°38′26″W
WV-66	Buffalo Creek Bridge	Replaced	Reinforced concrete open-spandrel arch	1934	1996	US 19	Buffalo Creek	Fairmont	Marion	39°29′47″N 80°08′27″W
WV-67	Back Run Bridge	Ruin		1915	2000	Harrisville Southern Railroad	Back Run	Harrisville	Ritchie	
WV-73	Williamstown–Marietta Bridge	Replaced	Cantilever	1903	1987	WV 31 / SR 60	Ohio River	Williamstown, West Virginia, and Marietta, Ohio	Wood County, West Virginia, and Washington County, Ohio	39°24′32″N 81°26′53″W
WV-78	Wheeling Stone Arch Bridge	Extant	Stone arch	1817	1974	Main Street	Wheeling Creek	Wheeling	Ohio	40°03′48″N 80°43′24″W
WV-80	Hempfield Viaduct and Tunnel No. 1	Extant	Stone arch		1974	Former Baltimore and Ohio Railroad	Wheeling Creek	Wheeling	Ohio	40°04′22″N 80°42′41″W
WV-81	Elk River Truss Bridge	Extant	Pratt truss		1975	Former Penn Central Railroad	Elk River	Charleston	Kanawha	38°21′30″N 81°37′49″W
WV-88	Parkersburg Suspension Bridge	Replaced	Suspension	1916	1973	US 50	Ohio River	Parkersburg, West Virginia, and Belpre, Ohio	Wood County, West Virginia, and Washington County, Ohio	39°16′15″N 81°33′58″W

== See also ==
- List of tunnels documented by the Historic American Engineering Record in West Virginia
