= Norfolk Southern Bridge =

Several notable bridges owned (or operated) by Norfolk Southern Railway include:

- Norfolk Southern Bridge (Kenova, West Virginia), crossing the Ohio River between South Point, Ohio and Kenova, West Virginia
- Norfolk Southern–Gregson Street Overpass, in Durham, North Carolina
- Norfolk Southern James River Bridge, in Richmond, Virginia
- Norfolk Southern Lake Pontchartrain Bridge, in Louisiana
- Norfolk Southern Six Mile Bridge No. 58, crossing the James River near Lynchburg, Virginia
- Norfolk Southern James River Trestle, also crossing the James River near Lynchburg, Virginia but is much larger than Six Mile Bridge No. 58
- Norfolk Southern Tennessee River Bridge, at Decatur, Alabama
