= List of tunnels documented by the Historic American Engineering Record in West Virginia =

This is a list of tunnels documented by the Historic American Engineering Record in the U.S. state of West Virginia.

== Tunnels ==
Survey No.	Name (as assigned by HAER)	Built	Documented	Carries	Crosses	Location	County	Coordinates
WV-16	Baltimore & Ohio Railroad, Kingwood Tunnel (abandoned)	1857	1984	Former Baltimore and Ohio Railroad		Tunnelton	Preston	39°23′22″N 79°45′34″W
WV-37	Board Tree Tunnel (abandoned)	1858	1984	Former Baltimore and Ohio Railroad		Littleton	Wetzel	39°43′19″N 80°31′49″W
WV-80	Hempfield Viaduct & Tunnel No. 1 (abandoned)		1974	Former Baltimore and Ohio Railroad	Wheeling Creek	Wheeling	Ohio	40°04′22″N 80°42′41″W
WV-93	Chesapeake & Ohio Railroad, Great Bend Tunnel	1872		Chesapeake and Ohio Railway		Talcott	Summers	37°38′57″N 80°46′04″W

== See also ==
- List of bridges documented by the Historic American Engineering Record in West Virginia
