= Board Tree Tunnel =

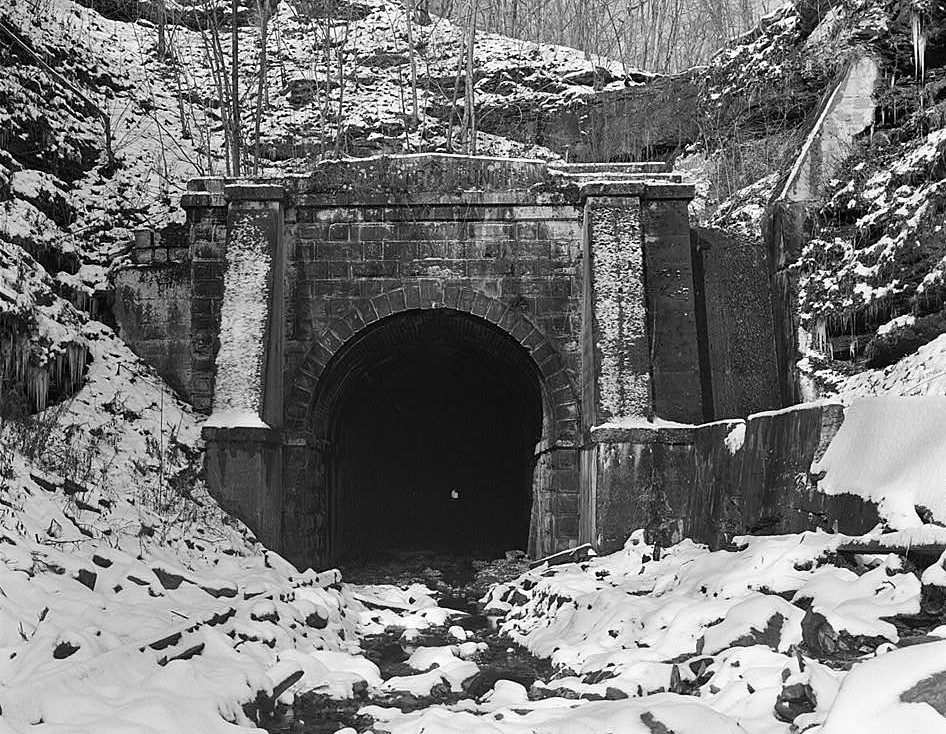
- South portal of Board Tree Tunnel in 1974
- Interactive map of Board Tree Tunnel

Overview
- Location: Littleton, West Virginia
- Coordinates: 39.72191°N 80.53021°W
- Status: abandoned

Operation
- Work began: 1851
- Constructed: brick and cut stone
- Opened: 1858

Technical
- Length: 2,350 feet (720 m)
- Track gauge: 4 ft 8 1/2 in (1,435 mm)

The Board Tree Tunnel, near Littleton, West Virginia, was built between 1851 and 1858 by the Baltimore and Ohio Railroad on its main line between Baltimore, Maryland, and Wheeling, West Virginia, under the supervision of B&O chief engineer Benjamin Henry Latrobe, II. The 2,350-foot (720 m) tunnel used a segmental cast iron lining system pioneered on the contemporaneous Kingwood Tunnel on the same line.

Workers were recruited from coal mines in the area to excavate the tunnel. The tunneling operations used black powder as explosive. About 30 deaths and 300 injuries occurred in the excavation of the Board Tree and Kingwood tunnels. The tunnel is now abandoned.

== See also ==
- List of tunnels documented by the Historic American Engineering Record in West Virginia
