= Fairmont Railroad Bridge =

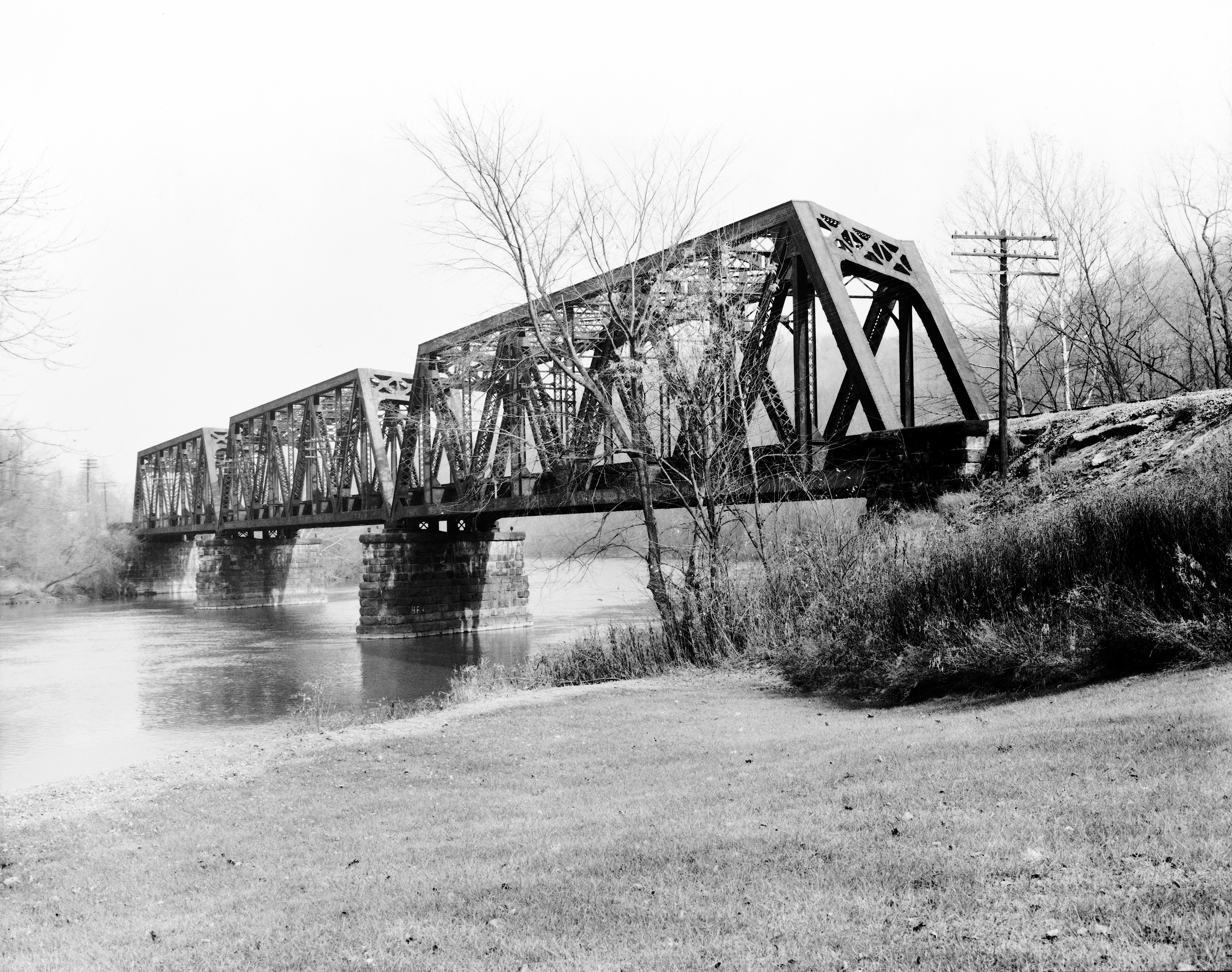
- Coordinates: 39°28′00″N 80°08′52″W
- Carries: CSX Fairmont Subdivision
- Crosses: Monongahela River
- Locale: Fairmont, West Virginia

Characteristics
- Design: Truss bridge

History
- Opened: 1912

The Fairmont Railroad Bridge is a truss bridge that carries the Norfolk Southern Railway across the Monongahela River just north of Fairmont, West Virginia. The bridge was built in 1853 as one of the early works of Albert Fink, the engineer who popularized the use of iron structures as opposed to those that are made of stone masonry or wood. It was reconstructed in 1912 and continues to serve as a major industrial route.

== See also ==
- List of bridges documented by the Historic American Engineering Record in West Virginia
