= Mud River Covered Bridge =

- U.S. National Register of Historic Places
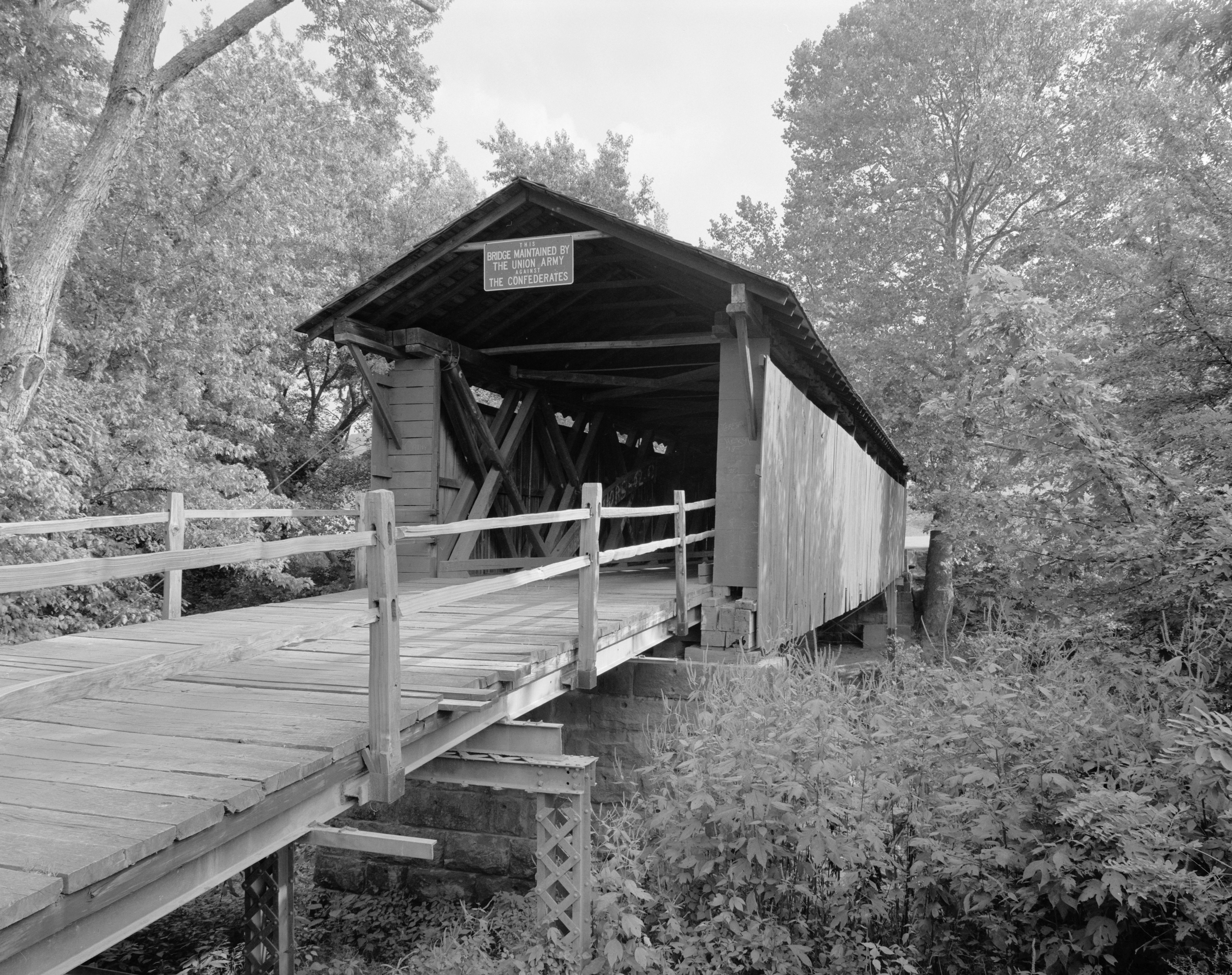
- Mud River Covered Bridge, August 1975

- Location within West Virginia Location within the United States
- Location: Off U.S. 60 on SR 25 over Mud River, Milton, West Virginia
- Coordinates: 38°25′40″N 82°8′4″W
- Area: 0.5 acres (0.20 ha)
- Built: 1875
- Architectural style: Modified Howe truss
- MPS: West Virginia Covered Bridges TR
- NRHP reference No.: 75001883
- Added to NRHP: June 10, 1975

Mud River Covered Bridge is a historic covered bridge that formerly spanned the Mud River at Milton, Cabell County, West Virginia. It was built about 1875, and is a single-span, modified Howe truss structure. It measures approximately 112 feet (34 m) in length and 14 feet (4.3 m) in width.

The bridge was restored in 1971 and listed on the National Register of Historic Places in 1975. It was relocated twice, first in 1997 to a temporary site near its original location, and then again in 2001 to a new location crossing a pond at the Cabell County Fairgrounds.

== See also ==
- List of covered bridges in West Virginia
- List of bridges documented by the Historic American Engineering Record in West Virginia
- National Register of Historic Places listings in Cabell County, West Virginia
