= Kenova, West Virginia =

City in West Virginia, US

- City
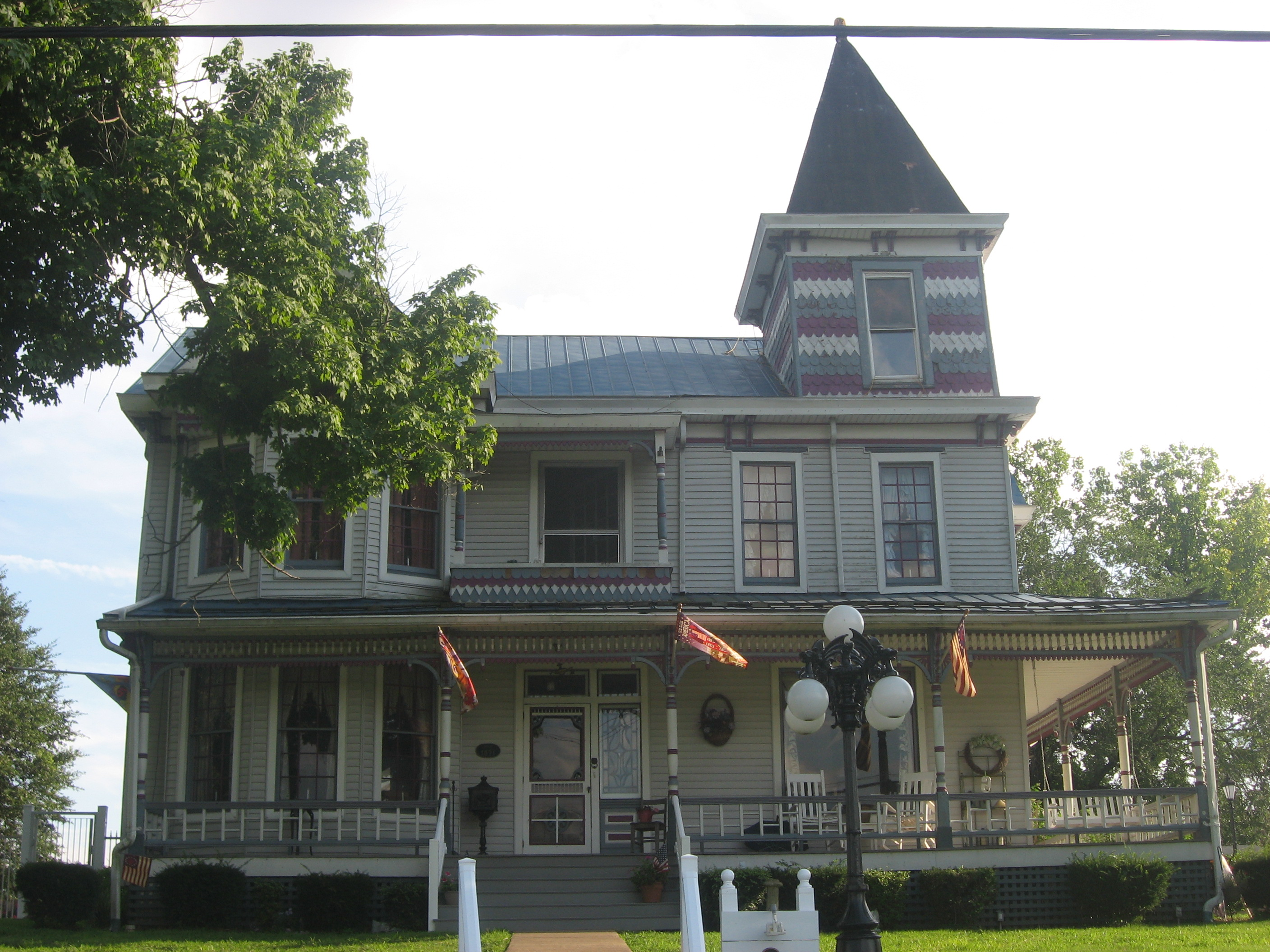
- Joseph S. Miller House

- Flag Seal Logo
- Nickname: Western Gate of the Mountain State
- Motto(s): Vox popoli vox Dei (English: The voice of the people is the voice of God)
- Location of Kenova in Wayne County, West Virginia.
- Coordinates: 38°23′59″N 82°34′43″W
- Country: United States
- State: West Virginia
- County: Wayne

Government
  - Type: Mayor–council
  - Mayor: Timothy Bias
  - Council president: Kent Keyser

Area
  - Total: 1.66 sq mi (4.30 km^{2})
  - Land: 1.32 sq mi (3.42 km^{2})
  - Water: 0.34 sq mi (0.88 km^{2})
- Elevation: 560 ft (170 m)

Population (2020)
  - Total: 3,033
  - Estimate (2021): 2,978
  - Density: 2,244.8/sq mi (866.71/km^{2})
- Time zone: UTC-5 (Eastern (EST))
  - Summer (DST): UTC-4 (EDT)
- ZIP code: 25530
- Area code: 304
- FIPS code: 54-43180
- GNIS feature ID: 1541155
- Website: https://kenovawv.com/

Kenova is a city in Wayne County, West Virginia, United States, situated at the confluence of the Ohio and Big Sandy rivers. The city's name is a portmanteau of Kentucky, Ohio, and Virginia (Va), owing to its location where the three states met before the creation of West Virginia. The population was 3,030 at the 2020 census. It is part of the Huntington–Ashland metropolitan area. Kenova was also formerly known as Morganza and Virginia Point.

== History ==
Founded in 1858, but not incorporated until 1894, the town's early history and development was centered on the railroad industry. It is home to a major Norfolk Southern Ohio River Bridge. CSX Transportation's former Chesapeake and Ohio Kanawha Subdivision travels through the town as well. The city is also near the site of the Southern Airways Flight 932 aviation disaster. In 1970, a plane carrying the Marshall University football team crashed on a hillside on approach to the Tri-State Airport, killing all on board. A movie about the tragedy, We Are Marshall, was released in 2006.

== Geography ==
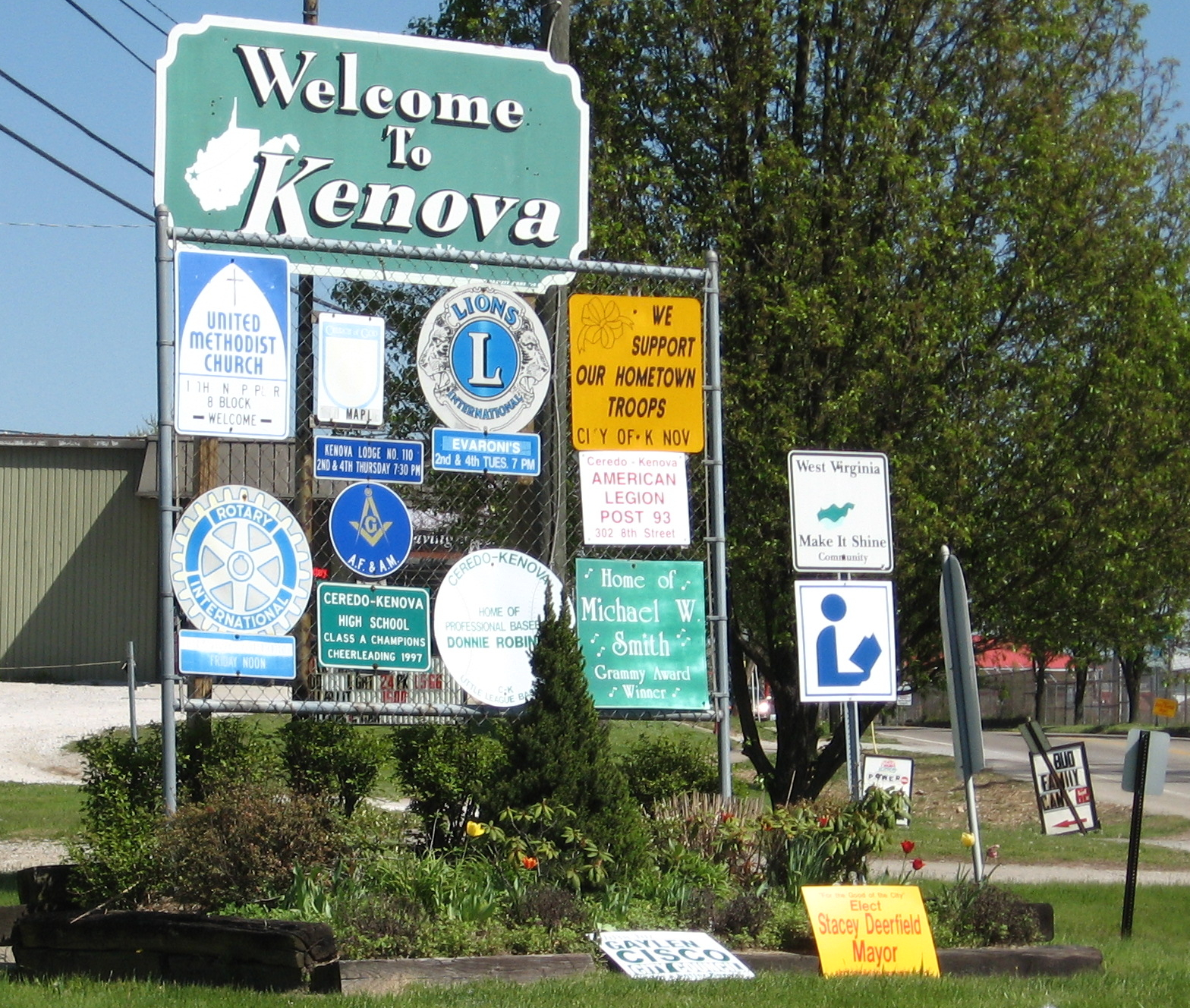
A sign welcoming motorists to Kenova along U.S. Route 60.

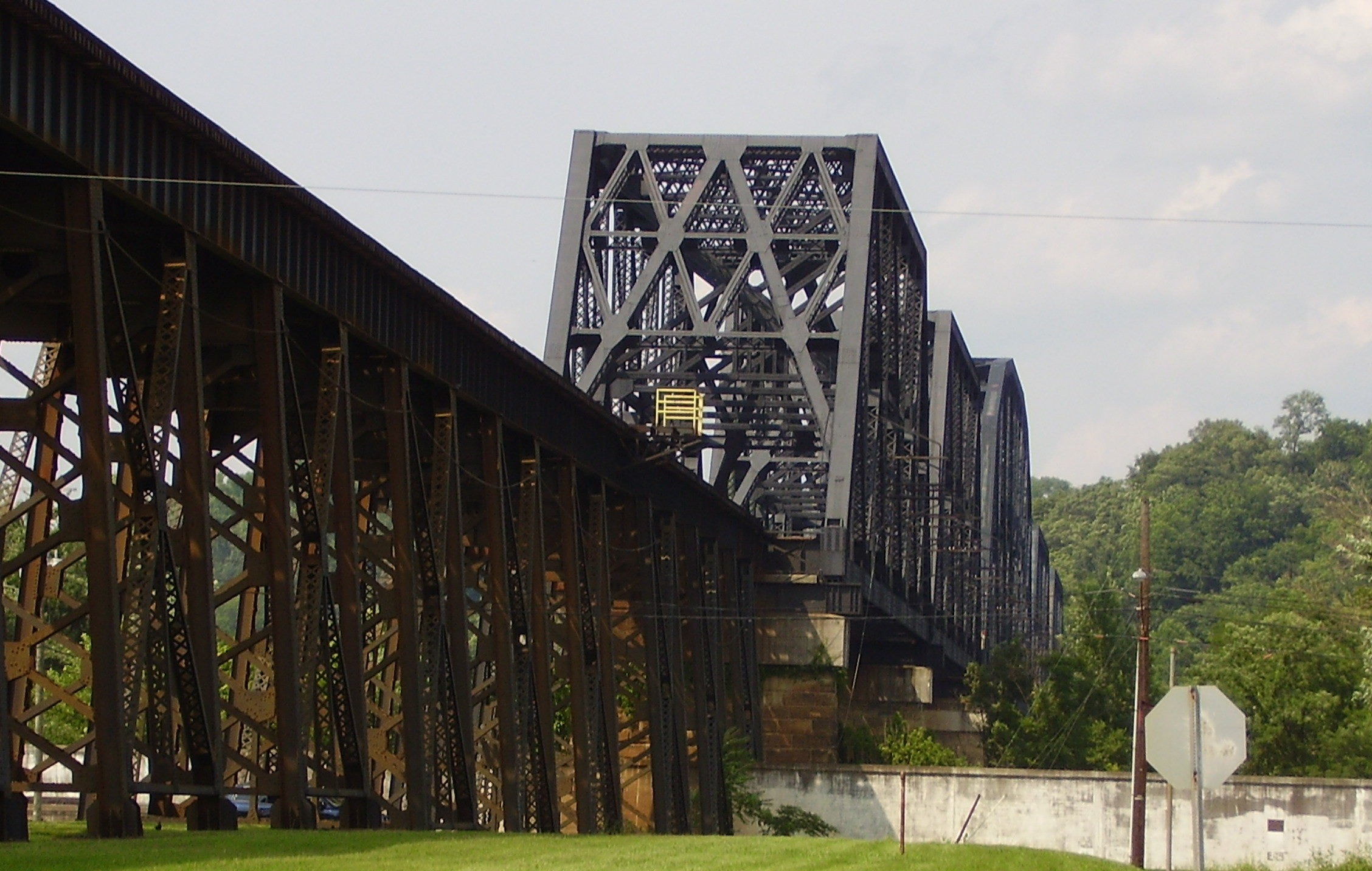
The Norfolk Southern Bridge as seen from Kenova

According to the United States Census Bureau, the city has a total area of 1.60 square miles (4.14 km^{2}), of which 1.26 square miles (3.26 km^{2}) is land and 0.34 square miles (0.88 km^{2}) is water.

== Demographics ==
Historical population
Census	Pop.	Note	%±
1900	863		—
1910	992		14.9%
1920	2,162		117.9%
1930	3,680		70.2%
1940	3,902		6.0%
1950	4,320		10.7%
1960	4,577		5.9%
1970	4,860		6.2%
1980	4,454		−8.4%
1990	3,748		−15.9%
2000	3,485		−7.0%
2010	3,216		−7.7%
2020	3,033		−5.7%
2021 (est.)	2,978		−1.8%

=== 2020 census ===
As of the 2020 census, Kenova had a population of 3,033. The median age was 43.3 years. 20.6% of residents were under the age of 18 and 20.6% of residents were 65 years of age or older. For every 100 females there were 89.0 males, and for every 100 females age 18 and over there were 86.5 males age 18 and over.

100.0% of residents lived in urban areas, while 0.0% lived in rural areas.

There were 1,371 households in Kenova, of which 25.2% had children under the age of 18 living in them. Of all households, 33.6% were married-couple households, 21.2% were households with a male householder and no spouse or partner present, and 37.3% were households with a female householder and no spouse or partner present. About 38.0% of all households were made up of individuals and 18.7% had someone living alone who was 65 years of age or older.

There were 1,563 housing units, of which 12.3% were vacant. The homeowner vacancy rate was 4.7% and the rental vacancy rate was 5.9%.

Racial composition as of the 2020 census
Race	Number	Percent
White	2,906	95.8%
Black or African American	12	0.4%
American Indian and Alaska Native	7	0.2%
Asian	5	0.2%
Native Hawaiians and Other Pacific Islander	0	0.0%
Some other race	12	0.4%
Two or more races	91	3.0%
Hispanic or Latino (of any race)	29	1.0%

=== 2010 census ===
As of the census of 2010, there were 3,216 people, 1,441 households, and 868 families living in the city. The population density was 2,552.4 inhabitants per square mile (985.5/km^{2}). There were 1,645 housing units at an average density of 1,305.6 per square mile (504.1/km^{2}). The racial makeup of the city was 98.8% White, 0.2% African American, 0.3% Native American, 0.1% Asian, 0.1% from other races, and 0.7% from two or more races. Hispanic or Latino of any race were 1.0% of the population.

There were 1,441 households, of which 29.3% had children under the age of 18 living with them, 38.0% were married couples living together, 16.7% had a female householder with no husband present, 5.6% had a male householder with no wife present, and 39.8% were non-families. 35.6% of all households were made up of individuals, and 16.3% had someone living alone who was 65 years of age or older. The average household size was 2.22 and the average family size was 2.84.

The median age in the city was 40.6 years. 22.1% of residents were under the age of 18; 8% were between the ages of 18 and 24; 24.8% were from 25 to 44; 26.6% were from 45 to 64, and 18.6% were 65 years of age or older. The gender makeup of the city was 45.8% male and 54.2% female.

=== 2000 census ===
As of the census of 2000, there were 3,485 people, 1,594 households, and 996 families living in the city. The population density was 2,887.9 people per square mile (1,112.0/km^{2}). There were 1,767 housing units at an average density of 1,464.3 per square mile (563.8/km^{2}). The racial makeup of the city was 99.23% White, 0.23% African American, 0.17% Native American, 0.06% Asian, 0.03% from other races, and 0.29% from two or more races. Hispanic or Latino of any race were 0.20% of the population.

There were 1,594 households, out of which 24.5% had children under the age of 18 living with them, 43.3% were married couples living together, 14.9% had a female householder with no husband present, and 37.5% were non-families. 34.8% of all households were made up of individuals, and 15.9% had someone living alone who was 65 years of age or older. The average household size was 2.18 and the average family size was 2.77.

In the city, the population was spread out, with 20.5% under the age of 18, 9.0% from 18 to 24, 25.7% from 25 to 44, 24.6% from 45 to 64, and 20.1% who were 65 years of age or older. The median age was 41 years. For every 100 females, there were 83.7 males. For every 100 females age 18 and over, there were 81.0 males.

The median income for a household in the city was $23,342, and the median income for a family was $29,688. Males had a median income of $27,656 versus $22,500 for females. The per capita income for the city was $16,485. About 14.5% of families and 18.6% of the population were below the poverty line, including 26.4% of those under age 18 and 12.6% of those age 65 or over.

== Arts and culture ==
Dreamland Pool, first opened in 1926, was once the largest swimming pool in the United States east of the Mississippi River, measuring 250 feet (76 m) by 125 feet (38 m). The original construction included a three-story pavilion that ran the length of the pool. The top floor of the pavilion included a dance floor, where many notable Big Bands played though the 1930s and 1940s and attracted big names such as Benny Goodman, Louis Armstrong, and Frank Sinatra. A fire in 1972 destroyed the pavilion, but the rest of the facility survived. The pool was conveyed to the City of Kenova in 1973. Presently, the Kenova Parks & Recreation Board oversees the operation and management of the facility. About the size of a football field, Dreamland sports two cement floats equidistant from each other in the middle of the pool to allow swimmers a place to rest. Dreamland Pool was recently renovated in 2015.

The 1891 Victorian Joseph S. Miller House is listed on the National Register of Historic Places and was once visited by President Grover Cleveland. In recent years it has become known as The Pumpkin House, because of the more than 3000 hand-carved Jack-o-Lanterns which adorn it each Halloween season. The Pumpkin House has received national media attention and has been featured on segments of NBC's The Today Show, The Ellen DeGeneres Show, and many other media outlets.

== Education ==
Since the closing of Ceredo-Kenova and Buffalo-Wayne High Schools in 1998, Kenova Elementary is the lone public education facility within Kenova city limits. The school has been awarded multiple national blue ribbons in academic achievement. Buffalo Elementary and Buffalo Middle schools are also located near Kenova, but just outside city limits. The former Ceredo-Kenova High School, locally known as "C-K," boasted a great number of athletic state championships, including 12 in football, two in basketball, one in cheerleading, and in 1995 won their only WV State Class A Region 4 Baseball championship. Buffalo can credit championships in boys' and girls' basketball and in football to their accomplishments. In 1998, Ceredo-Kenova and Buffalo-Wayne High Schools were closed and consolidated with Huntington-based Vinson High School to form Spring Valley High School. The former Vinson High School is now known as Vinson Middle School. In 2015 the former Ceredo-Kenova High School was demolished, and the former Buffalo-Wayne High School was razed in September 2019.

== Notable people ==
- Jeff Baldwin, MLB player
- Koka Booth, former politician and mayor of Cary, North Carolina
- Ric Griffith, former politician
- Bobby Joe Long, executed serial killer who raped and murdered 10 women in Tampa, Florida
- Wyatt Milum, NFL player
- Don Robinson, MLB pitcher
- Brad D. Smith, President of Marshall University and former chief executive officer of Intuit
- Michael W. Smith, musician, pastor, actor
- Charlie Snyder, former head coach for Marshall Thundering Herd football
- Rick Tolley, former Marshall University football coach who passed in the Southern Airways Flight 932

== See also ==
- List of cities and towns along the Ohio River
