= Morris Memorial Hospital for Crippled Children =

- U.S. National Register of Historic Places
- Location within West Virginia Location within the United States
- Location: Morris Memorial Rd. between the James River Turnpike and U.S. Route 60, Milton, West Virginia
- Coordinates: 38°25′14″N 82°06′28″W
- Area: 182.0 acres (73.7 ha)
- Built: 1936
- Built by: Works Progress Administration
- Architect: Frampton & Bowers
- Architectural style: Colonial Revival
- NRHP reference No.: 13000262
- Added to NRHP: May 8, 2013

Morris Memorial Hospital for Crippled Children, also known as Morris Memorial Nursing Home, is a historic hospital building located at Milton, Cabell County, West Virginia. It was built in 1936 by the Works Progress Administration as a hospital for children with polio. The modified U-shaped limestone building consists of a two-story central section, flanked by 1 1/2-story, Y-shaped wings. The central section features a domed and louvered cupola and a two-story portico. It has a T-shaped wing used as a school and a boiler house attached to the school wing by a hyphen. The hospital closed in 1960. It was subsequently used as a nursing home until 2009.

It was listed on the National Register of Historic Places in 2013.

== See also ==
- National Register of Historic Places listings in Cabell County, West Virginia
- Morris Memorial Hospital for Crippled Children at Abandoned
