= Joseph S. Miller House =

Historic house in West Virginia, United States

- U.S. National Register of Historic Places
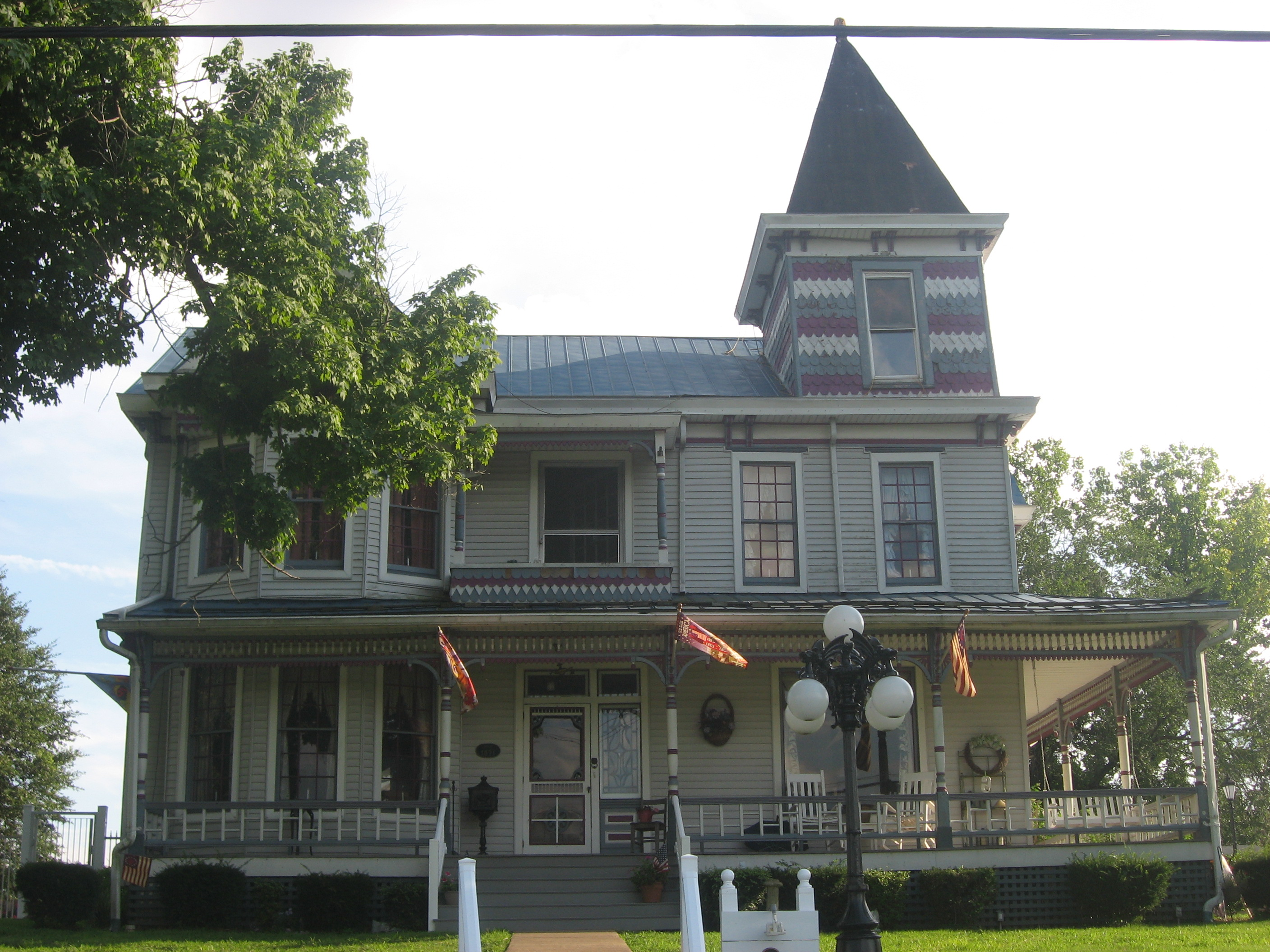
- Front of the house

- Location within West Virginia Location within the United States
- Location: 748 Beech St., Kenova, West Virginia
- Coordinates: 38°23′59″N 82°34′01″W
- Area: Less than 1 acre (0.40 ha)
- Built: 1891
- Architectural style: Stick/Eastlake, Queen Anne
- NRHP reference No.: 89000180
- Added to NRHP: March 29, 1989

Joseph S. Miller House is a historic home located at Kenova, Wayne County, West Virginia. It was built in 1891, in the Queen Anne style with Eastlake decorative elements. It is a two-story frame dwelling on a sandstone foundation with tower. It features a combination of wood fish scale, diamond and octagonal shingles on the balcony, the west bay, and tower sections.

It was listed on the National Register of Historic Places in 1989.

It is well known in the area for the annual tradition of decorating with thousands of pumpkins in the fall, colloquially known as the "Pumpkin House".

== Pumpkin House ==
The display features thousands of jack-o'-lanterns covering the home of Ric Griffith, the town pharmacist. The whole property is accessible to the public. It includes a wall of carved pumpkins called the Pumpkin Orchestra, which is synchronized to songs like "Dueling Banjos", "O Fortuna", and the 1812 Overture. It runs from October 25 to October 31. Aside from the display, it features Halloween-related activities, food vendors, and live entertainment.

The display is put together with the help of around 1,500 volunteers, with many from churches, youth groups, and schools, including students from Spring Valley High School. They make designs and carve the pumpkins. A wide variety of themes are found on them, including American presidents and designs related to Marshall University. Griffith provides instruction to carvers.

According to Griffith, about 100,000 people come to view the house, visiting from 46 countries and 48 states in 2024.

All the pumpkins come from a farmer in Proctorville, Ohio. After Halloween, the setup is disassembled and the pulp from carving and the pumpkins are donated for use as animal feed.

=== History ===
Kenova Pumpkin House in 2006

Griffith started the tradition in 1978 with just four pumpkins. The first jack-o'-lanterns were likenesses of each member of his family which he put on the porch of his house. He continued to carve more pumpkins each year to see how many he could create to decorate his house. After moving to a large Victorian home in 1991, the family took to the project even more to try to cover all the additional space. The 1891 Joseph S. Miller House is on the National Register of Historic Places due to its association with Joseph Miller, the Internal Revenue Service Commissioner under President Grover Cleveland, who once visited the house. The display eventually grew to over 3,000 pumpkins, with them even on the roof of the house.

In 2020, during the COVID-19 pandemic, Griffith decided it was too risky to do the display at his home due to the large crowds that congregate to view it. He opted instead to have members of the community come by and pick up a pumpkin so it can be carved and displayed at their own homes. He created printed out instructions to go with each pumpkin to help the children and their families carve them.

In 2024, pumpkins were carved in honor of noted West Virginians, including Shelley Moore Capito, Jennifer Garner, and Babydog, the English bulldog of former Governor and now senator Jim Justice.

In 2025, a scene of the horror film Self-Help was filmed at the Pumpkin House.

== Popular culture ==
- The Joseph S. Miller House is a location in the game Fallout 76, as the Pumpkin House
- Scenes of Self-Help were shot at the Joseph S. Miller House

== See also ==
- West Virginia Pumpkin Festival
