= Kingwood Tunnel =

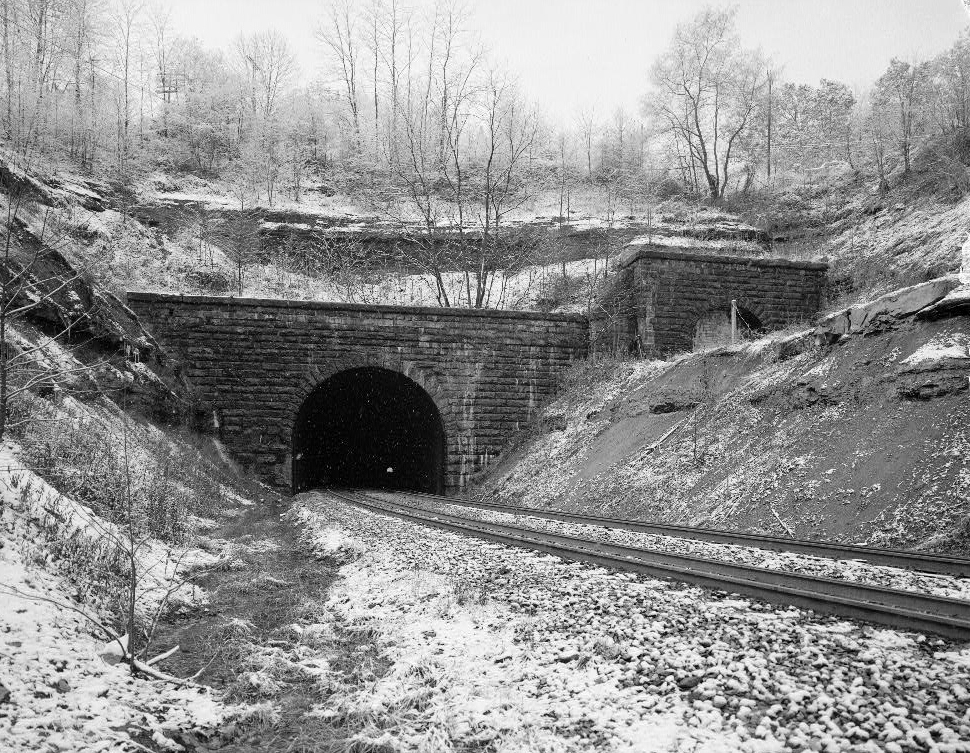
- The east portal of the 1911 Kingwood Tunnel, with the closed-up 1858 portal visible at above right
- Interactive map of Kingwood Tunnel

Overview
- Location: Tunnelton, West Virginia
- Coordinates: 39°23′22″N 79°45′34″W
- Status: abandoned

Operation
- Work began: 1849
- Constructed: brick and cut stone
- Opened: 1858

Technical
- Length: 4,137 feet (1,261 m)
- Track gauge: 4 ft 8 1/2 in (1,435 mm)

The Kingwood Tunnel, near Tunnelton, West Virginia, was built between 1849 and 1852 by the Baltimore and Ohio Railroad on its main line between Baltimore, Maryland and Wheeling, West Virginia, under the supervision of B&O chief engineer Benjamin Henry Latrobe, II. At the time of its completion the 4,137-foot (1,261 m) tunnel was the longest tunnel in the United States until it was surpassed by the Blue Ridge Tunnel in 1858.

Workers were recruited from coal mines in the area to excavate the tunnel. Three vertical shafts were established to allow work in two directions from each shaft, and from either end, using eight headings. The shafts were about 180 feet (55 m) deep and measured about 15 feet (4.6 m) by 20 feet (6.1 m). The hoists were operated using horses. The tunneling operations used black powder as explosive. Dangerous rock conditions at the east end of the tunnel and accidents with black powder caused many casualties, with a total of about 30 deaths and 300 injuries in the excavation of the Kingwood Tunnel and the contemporaneous Board Tree Tunnel on the same line.

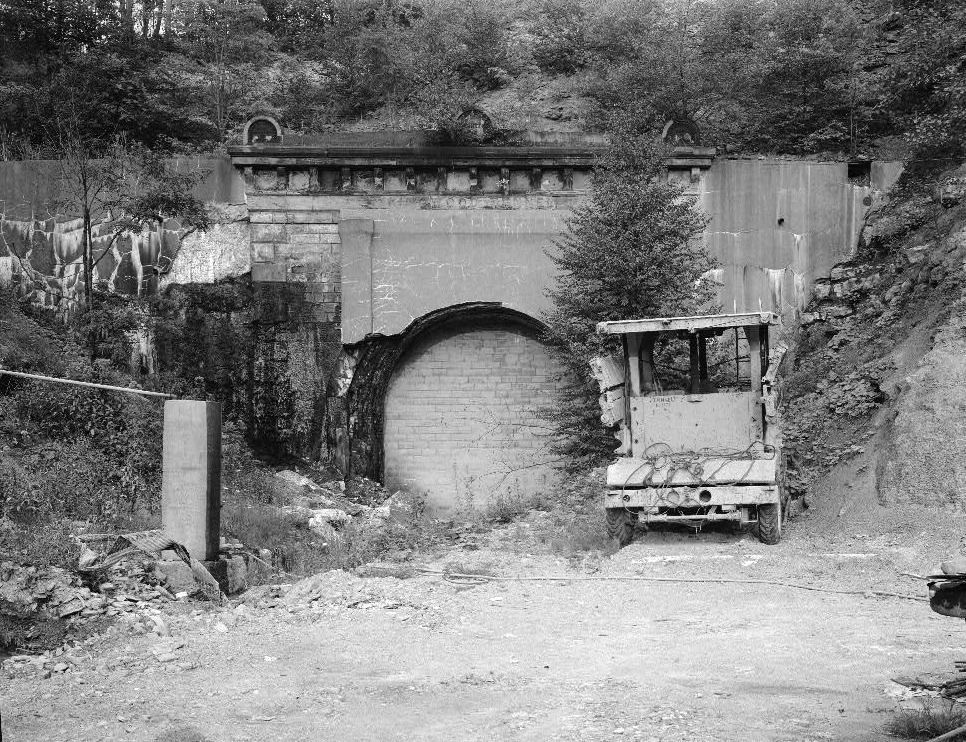
The west portal of the original tunnel in 1974

Although the tunnel itself was completed in 1852, track was not laid, due to problems with the east entrance. A temporary switchback track, requiring reversal at each stage, was built to provide service until the tunnel was finished. Work began in 1854 on an arched liner using prefabricated sections of iron, faced with stone against the eventual deterioration of the iron liners. 1,200 feet (370 m) of this system were used at the east end, and another 1,700 feet (520 m) of the tunnel were lined with brick. Lining work, followed by track laying, was completed in 1858. It was completed with two tracks, but the increasing size of rolling stock necessitated a conversion to single track after 1865. Grouting and underpinning work was required in 1889 through the entire length of the tunnel, and additional brick lining was later installed in the section with iron liners.

The single-track tunnel was bypassed by a double-track tunnel in 1912. The new tunnel's east portal incorporated the old east portal, and the original tunnel continued in service. The old bore was abandoned and sealed in 1962.

== See also ==
- List of tunnels documented by the Historic American Engineering Record in West Virginia
