= West Virginia Pumpkin Festival =

- Nickname: Milton Pumpkin Festival
- Genre: food festivals
- Frequency: Annually
- Venue: West Virginia Pumpkin Park
- Location: Milton, West Virginia
- Country: United States
- Years active: 40–41
- Inaugurated: 1985
- Participants: +50,000
- Website: wvpumpkinfestival.com

The West Virginia Pumpkin Festival, or the Milton Pumpkin Festival, is an annual festival in Milton, West Virginia, dedicated to the fall season and harvests. The festival started in 1985, and has been hosted annually in October (except 2020) at the West Virginia Pumpkin Park. In 2025 the festival hosted over 50,000 participants.

== See also ==
- West Virginia Pumpkin House
