= Phillip Swann =

American singer

Phil Swann
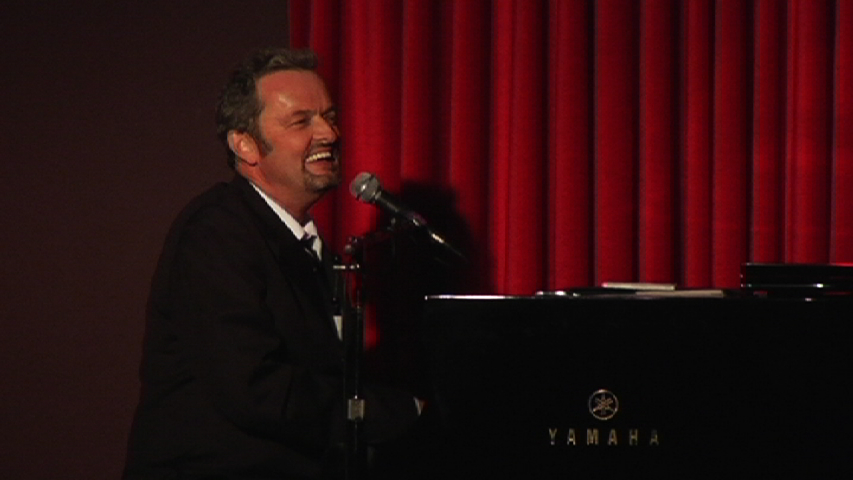
- Swann performing live at his CD release show on August 17, 2011

Background information
- Born: Phillip Douglas Swann; November 8, 1960; Milton, West Virginia
- Occupations: Singer-songwriter; composer; producer; arranger; teacher; author
- Years active: 1976–present
- Website: PhilSwann.com

Phil Swann (born Phillip Douglas Swann, November 8, 1960, in Milton, West Virginia, United States) is an American singer, songwriter, composer, record producer, arranger, teacher and author. His songs have been heard in television, film, and theater, and have been recorded by numerous artists including Clay Aiken, Lee Ann Womack, Eamonn McCrystal, Blake Shelton, Neal McCoy, Rodney Atkins, Kristin Garner and Lee Greenwood. He has also achieved international success as a playwright and mystery novelist.

== Early life ==
Phil Swann was born to Lewis Swann, a sign painter and engineer, and Nancy (née Douglas). He was raised outside Huntington in the small town of Milton, West Virginia. He has two older siblings, Linda and Greg.

At age 14, Swann began playing piano and singing in local churches, American Legions and civic organizations around the Tri-State area (West Virginia, Ohio and Kentucky). When he was 16, he was cast in the long running professional summer stock musical, The Hatfields and McCoys, in Beckley, West Virginia. Upon returning for his senior year of high school, Swann enrolled part-time at Marshall University where he studied theatre and speech in the evenings. He subsequently participated in the college's theatrical productions and concerts. After graduating from Milton High School, he moved to New York City to attend the American Academy of Dramatic Arts. In New York, Swann continued playing piano and singing as a way of supporting himself while in acting school. He performed with bands, played on recording sessions and worked as a solo performer in piano bars throughout the city.

After graduating from college, Swann went on the road acting in various productions but ultimately found playing music more lucrative. He formed numerous bands and performed all over the country in hotels, nightclubs and on the county and state fair circuit. He moved to Muscle Shoals, Alabama to break into the legendary Muscle Shoals music scene as a songwriter and session player. Though his time there was short-lived and unheralded, professional relationships were formed that would later become important in his career. After a brief stint in Nashville, Swann went back on the road playing music, with songwriting being the center of his focus. In 1988, he moved to Los Angeles.

== Songwriter ==
In 1991, Swann was signed to the newly formed Los Angeles based music publishing company Southern Cow Music, a company started by his friend, Hollywood talent agent Steve Bloch. Beyond writing songs for Southern Cow, Swann also listened to other songwriters' songs being pitched to the company. Swann has said in interviews that this period "on the other side of the desk" was one of the most valuable learning experiences in his career. "I started hearing my own songs with the ears of a executive and it changed everything." Swann established himself as a prolific and sought-after songwriter through the 90s, garnering cuts on many artists' albums and becoming a fixture in the LA songwriting scene. When Southern Cow Music relocated its main offices to Nashville in 1996, Swann stayed in Los Angeles to head the west coast office as vice president.

For most of the 90s and mid-2000s, Swann split his time between Los Angeles and Nashville, writing songs for the biggest names in country and pop music. He became very active with the Songwriter's Guild of America, initially by holding songwriting workshops for the organization's non-profit foundation, and ultimately being named to the organization's board of directors. Through the guild, he became friends and a collaborator with legendary songwriters such as Jack Segal, Bobby Troop, Vic Mizzy, Donald Kahn, Al Kasha and Ray Evans.

== Dreamworks ==
In 2000, Steve Bloch orchestrated a deal that landed Swann a songwriting and producer contract with DreamWorks SKG, the company owned by Steven Spielberg, Jeffrey Katzenberg and David Geffen. The music division of the company was headed up by iconic music chiefs, Mo Ostin, Chuck Kaye and James Stroud. At the time, the label was having success with artists such as Nelly Furtado, Papa Roach and All-American Rejects along with Nashville artists Toby Keith, Jessica Andrews, Tracy Lawrence and Randy Travis. Swann wrote for the company until its dissolution in 2005.

== Theatre ==
In 2005, actor, writer and Second City alumni Ron West, approached Swann to co-write a musical comedy based on Shakespeare's Romeo and Juliet. A year later, The People Vs. Friar Laurence, the Man Who Killed Romeo and Juliet was co-produced by The Second City and the Chicago Shakespeare Theater. The show was a critical and commercial success, and was nominated for three Jeffrey Joseph Awards including Best New Musical.

Swann has composed music for the award-winning off-Broadway musical Play It Cool, as well as DeLEARious (another Swann/West collaboration), which received the 2009 Garland Award from Backstage for Best New Score. Other musicals by Swann include In a Booth at Chasen's, Trombone, Neil Simon's Musical' Fools, Shakespeare's Greatest Hits, and It Had To Be You, a musical based on the life and songs of the famed lyricist Gus Kahn. Musical Fools premiered on February 1, 2013, at Ramone C Cortines School for the Visual and Performing Arts in Los Angeles, and has since been produced throughout the world in both professional and amateur theaters.

== Production ==
Swann's production credits include Helen Slater, Laura Hall, Kelly McCleod, Roberta Duchak, Daniel Nahmod, Jennifer Capelo, Adrina Thorpe, Daniela Kuri, The Sweet Potatoes, and Greg Rowles. Swann is also credited as the producer on the cast recordings of his musicals The People Vs Friar Laurence, the Man Who Killed Romeo and Juliet and Play It Cool. Play It Cool was selected as one of eight productions to present at the 2010 National Alliance for Musical Theatre festival in New York City. In 2013, Swann produced the folk rock band The Good Mad's EP Alta.

== Educator ==
Since 1998, Swann has taught on the art and craft of songwriting at UCLA through the school's extension program. He currently sits on the Board of Advisors for the school's music production program. He also sits on the faculty of the Los Angeles College of Music.

== Solo career ==
On May 24, 2011, Swann released his first solo CD, Stale Scotch and Cheap Cigars. It received critical acclaim.

Swann has performed shows in New York City and Los Angeles.

On November 30, 2012, Swann released the EP Age of Opportunity.

== Television ==
Swann has appeared as both an actor and musician in numerous TV shows, most notably playing the character Sam on NBC's Days of Our Lives.

== Author ==
Swann is the author of The Sideman Mysteries, (also known as the Trip Callaway Gig mystery book series) which include, Cold War Copa, Mekong Delta Blues, Tinsel Town Tango, Ships & Salsa and Stardust Shuffle. He is also the author of the one-off mystery thrillers The Song of Eleusis and The Mozart Conspiracy. The Mozart Conspiracy is also published in an Italian translation by TimeCrime under the title Il Codice Amudeus.

== Personal life ==
Phil Swann is married to theatre educator Amanda Swann. They currently reside in Los Angeles.

He is a cousin to country music superstar Brad Paisley. He has no relation, however, to Billy Swan.

== Other sources ==
- Phil Swann. UCLA Extension. Accessed 2010-12-22.
