= Mud River (West Virginia) =

River in the United States of America

Coordinates: 38°24′58″N 82°17′44″W

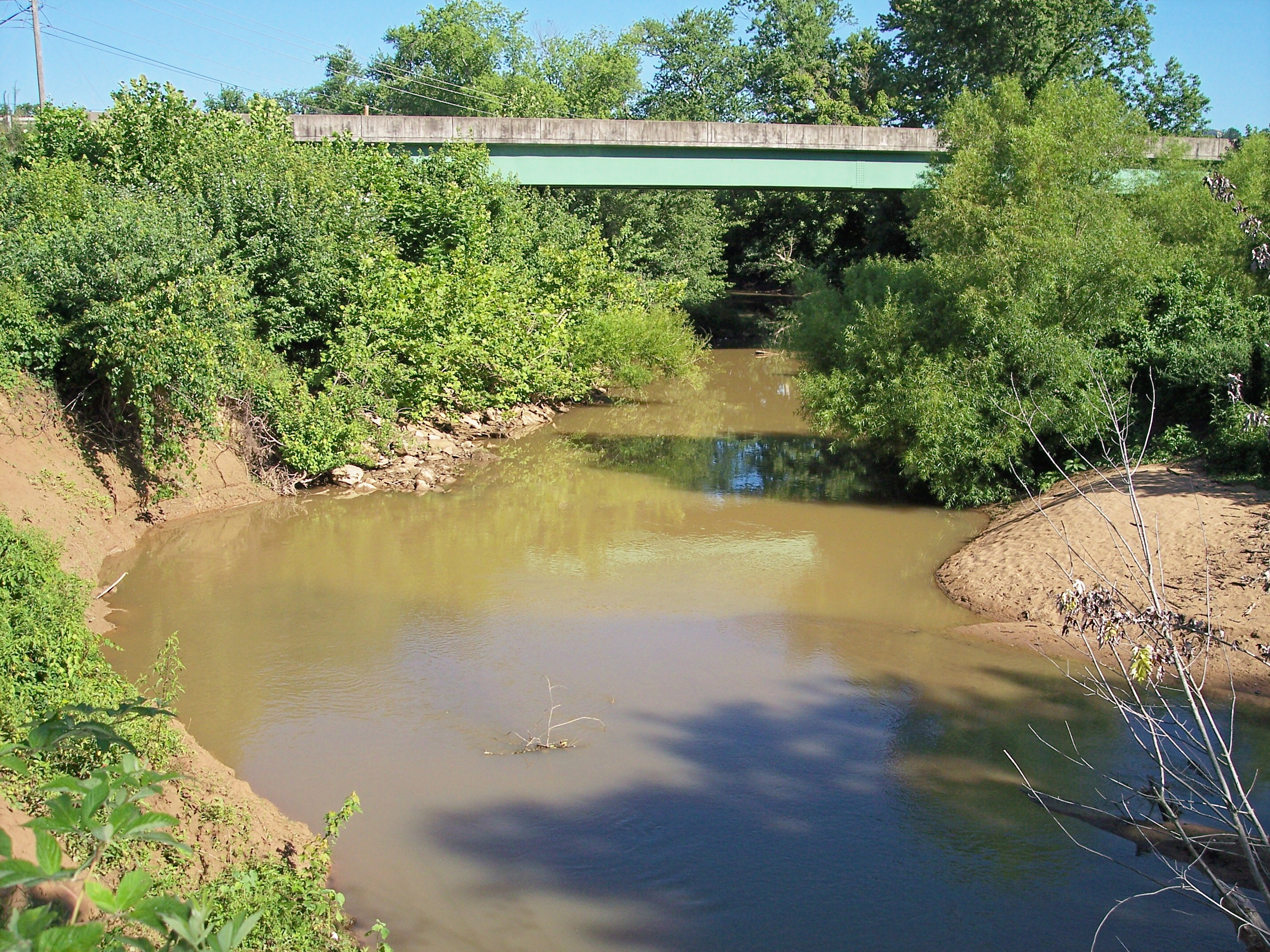
The Mud River in Milton in 2007

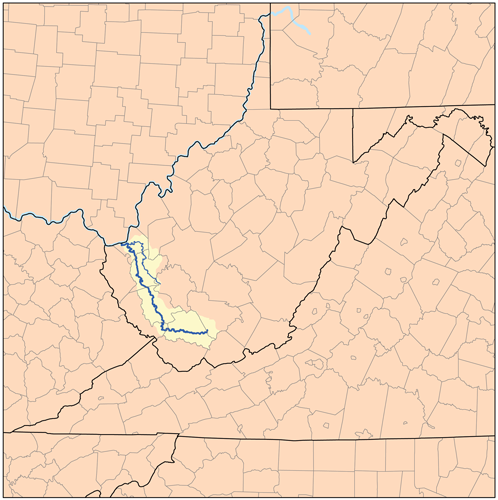
A map of the Guyandotte River watershed, including the Guyandotte and Mud rivers

The Mud River is a tributary of the Guyandotte River in southwestern West Virginia in the United States. Via the Guyandotte and Ohio Rivers, it is part of the Mississippi River watershed. The river is popular with muskellunge anglers.

The Mud River was so named on account of the muddy character of its water.

== Course ==
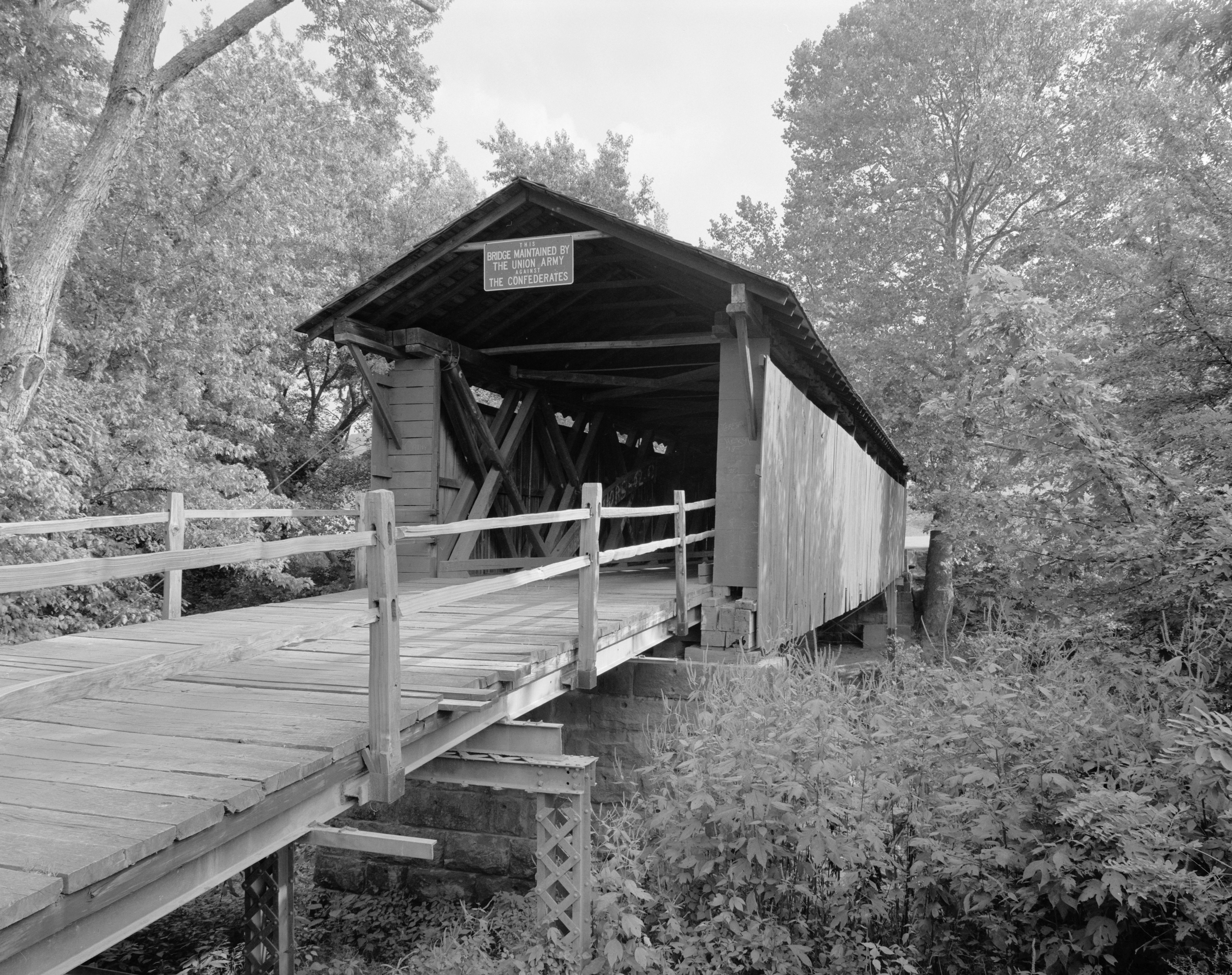
The Mud River Covered Bridge, registered on the U.S. National Register of Historic Places, formerly spanned across the river until it was relocated to the Cabell County Fairgrounds in 2001.

The Mud River rises in Boone County, west of Madison, and flows generally northwestward for 72 mi (116 km) through Lincoln and Cabell counties, past the towns of Hamlin and Milton. It meets the Guyandotte at the town of Barboursville. Near the stream's mouth, the Mud River meanders through the large, ancient valley of the Teays River.

== Milton levee project ==
A levee with sections of floodwall is planned to be built alongside the river in the town of Milton in Cabell County to protect the town from flooding. It is planned to be 1.5 miles in length.

== See also ==
- List of rivers of West Virginia
