= Milton, West Virginia =

City in Cabell County, West Virginia, United States

- Town
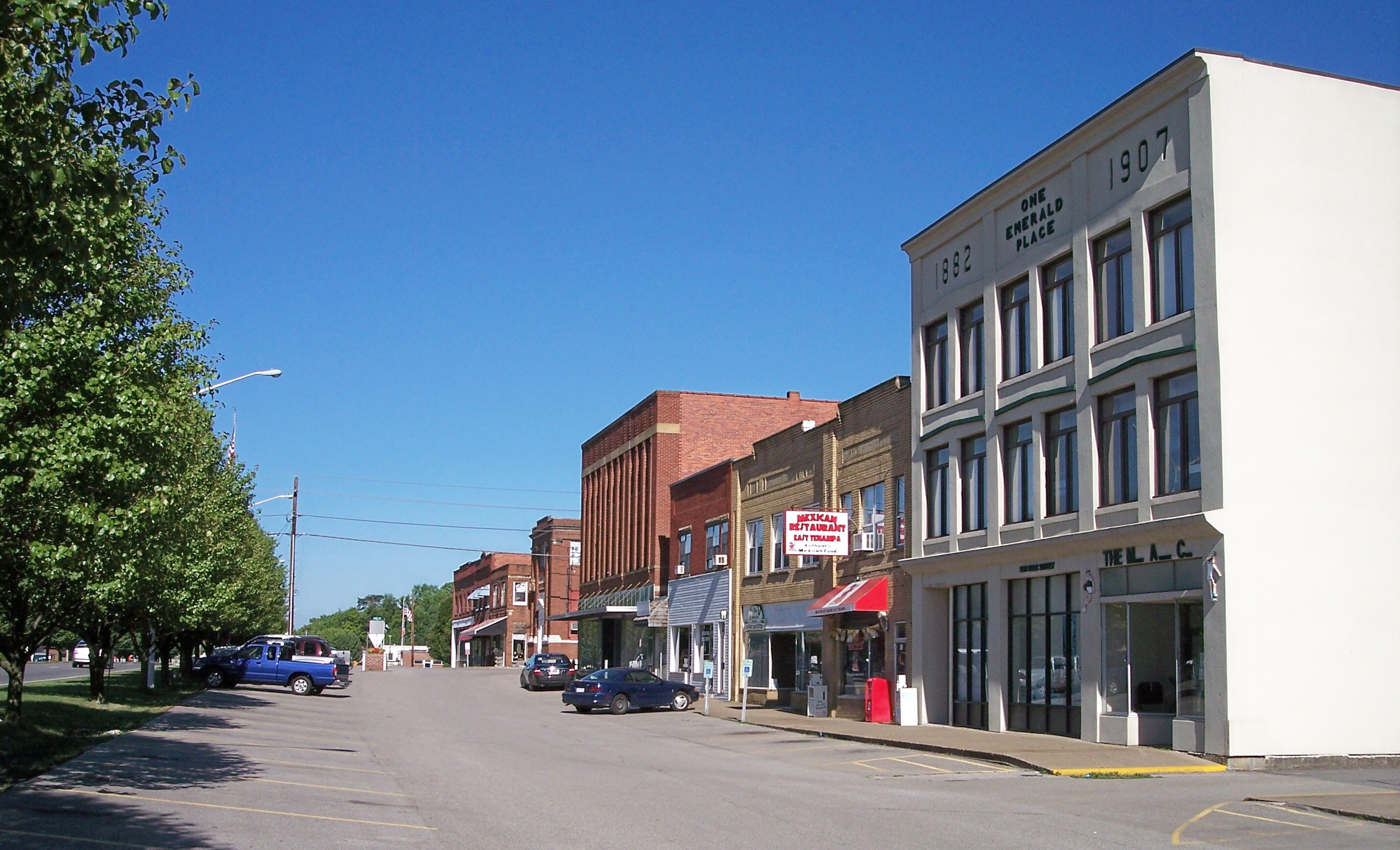
- Main Street along U.S. Route 60 in Milton in 2007
- Motto: “Where Living Is A Pleasure!”
- Location of Milton in Cabell County, West Virginia.
- Coordinates: 38°26′10″N 82°08′00″W
- Country: United States
- State: West Virginia
- County: Cabell
- Incorporated: 1876

Government
  - Mayor: Shane Evans

Area
  - Total: 2.01 sq mi (5.21 km^{2})
  - Land: 1.97 sq mi (5.10 km^{2})
  - Water: 0.042 sq mi (0.11 km^{2})
- Elevation: 584 ft (178 m)

Population (2020)
  - Total: 2,811
  - Estimate (2021): 2,809
  - Density: 1,286.7/sq mi (496.79/km^{2})
- Time zone: UTC-5 (Eastern (EST))
  - Summer (DST): UTC-4 (EDT)
- ZIP code: 25541
- Area code: 304
- FIPS code: 54-54484
- GNIS feature ID: 1543433
- Website: https://www.cityofmiltonwv.com/

Milton is a town in Cabell County, West Virginia, United States. The population was 2,831 at the 2020 census. It is part of the Huntington–Ashland metropolitan area.

== History ==
The town was named after Milton Reece, the original owner of the town site.

== Geography ==
Milton is located along the Mud River.

According to the United States Census Bureau, the town has a total area of 1.58 square miles (4.09 km^{2}), of which 1.54 square miles (3.99 km^{2}) is land and 0.04 square miles (0.10 km^{2}) is water.

== Demographics ==
Historical population
Census	Pop.	Note	%±
1880	377		—
1890	548		45.4%
1900	582		6.2%
1910	837		43.8%
1920	1,023		22.2%
1930	1,305		27.6%
1940	1,641		25.7%
1950	1,552		−5.4%
1960	1,714		10.4%
1970	1,597		−6.8%
1980	2,178		36.4%
1990	2,242		2.9%
2000	2,206		−1.6%
2010	2,423		9.8%
2020	2,811		16.0%
2021 (est.)	2,809	▼	−0.1%
U.S. Decennial Census

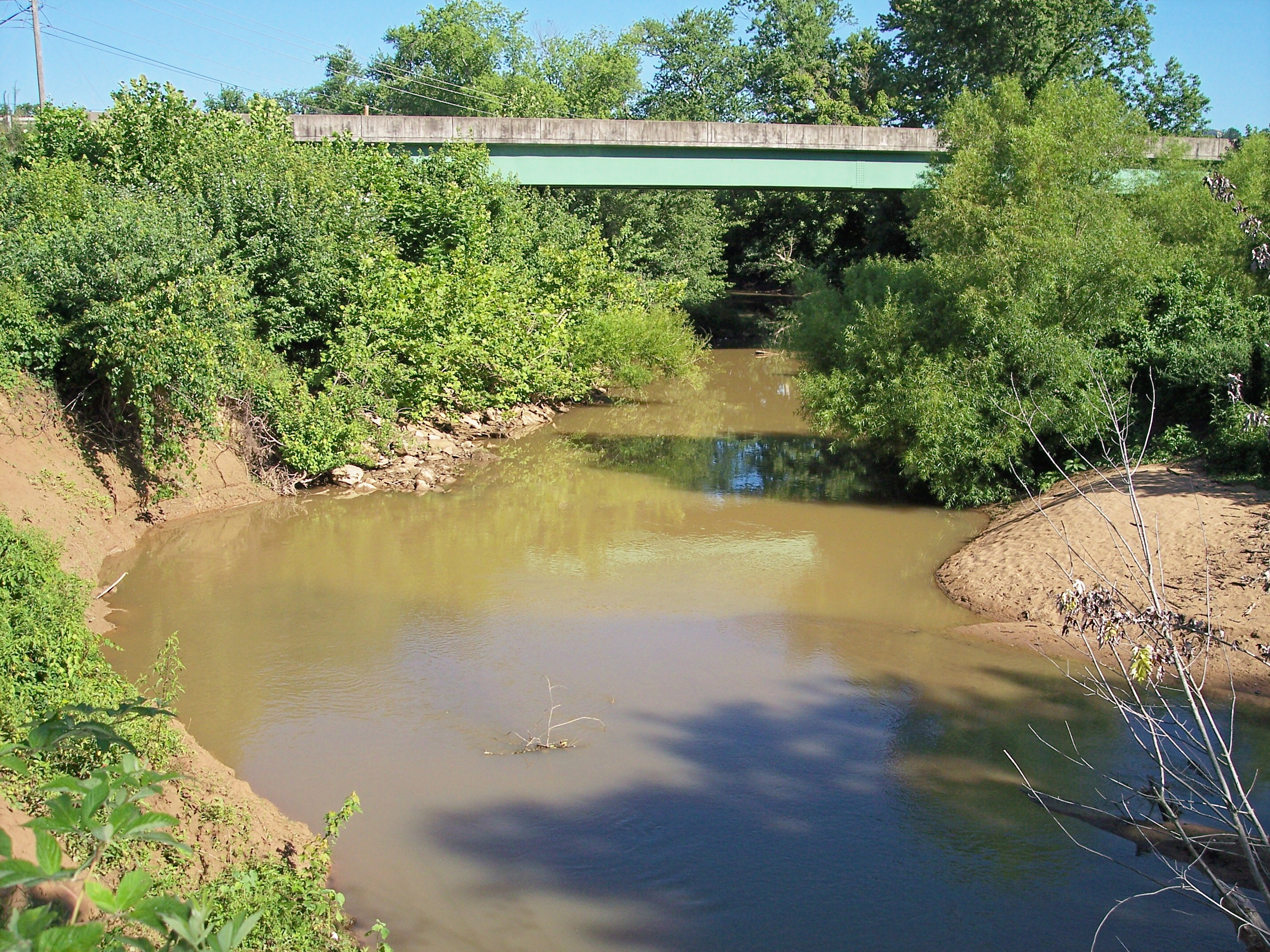
Mud River in Milton, 2007

=== 2000 census ===
As of the census of 2000, there were 2,206 people, 1,010 households, and 628 families living in the town. The population density was 1,400.0 inhabitants per square mile (539.1/km^{2}). There were 1,116 housing units at an average density of 708.2 per square mile (272.7/km^{2}). The racial makeup of the town was 99.23% White, 0.45% African American, 0.05% Native American, 0.05% Asian, 0.09% from other races, and 0.14% from two or more races. Hispanic or Latino of any race were 0.68% of the population.

There were 1,010 households, out of which 28.4% had children under the age of 18 living with them, 45.8% were married couples living together, 13.3% had a female householder with no husband present, and 37.8% were non-families. 34.2% of all households were made up of individuals, and 16.5% had someone living alone who was 65 years of age or older. The average household size was 2.18 and the average family size was 2.78.

In the town, the population was spread out, with 21.6% under the age of 18, 9.2% from 18 to 24, 27.6% from 25 to 44, 22.6% from 45 to 64, and 19.0% who were 65 years of age or older. The median age was 39 years. For every 100 females there were 87.4 males. For every 100 females age 18 and over, there were 83.8 males.

The median income for a household in the town was $29,348, and the median income for a family was $31,786. Males had a median income of $31,003 versus $19,457 for females. The per capita income for the town was $15,384. About 16.6% of families and 17.4% of the population were below the poverty line, including 28.2% of those under age 18 and 8.3% of those age 65 or over.

=== 2010 census ===
As of the census of 2010, there were 2,423 people, 1,132 households, and 666 families living in the town. The population density was 1,573.4 inhabitants per square mile (607.5/km^{2}). There were 1,243 housing units at an average density of 807.1 per square mile (311.6/km^{2}). The racial makeup of the town was 97.6% White, 0.7% African American, 0.1% Asian, 0.5% from other races, and 1.0% from two or more races. Hispanic or Latino of any race were 1.0% of the population.

There were 1,132 households, of which 25.6% had children under the age of 18 living with them, 42.2% were married couples living together, 12.4% had a female householder with no husband present, 4.2% had a male householder with no wife present, and 41.2% were non-families. 36.0% of all households were made up of individuals, and 17.8% had someone living alone who was 65 years of age or older. The average household size was 2.14 and the average family size was 2.76.

The median age in the town was 42.2 years. 20.5% of residents were under the age of 18; 7.6% were between the ages of 18 and 24; 24.8% were from 25 to 44; 28.4% were from 45 to 64; and 18.5% were 65 years of age or older. The gender makeup of the town was 46.7% male and 53.3% female.

=== 2020 census ===
According to the 2020 United States Census, the town of Milton had a population of 2,371 people. There were 1,052 households and 624 families living in the town. The population density was 1,270.2 inhabitants per square mile (491.4/km2). The racial makeup of the town was 97.5% White, 0.7% African American, 0.3% Native American, 0.1% Asian, 0.2% from other races, and 1.2% from two or more races. Hispanic or Latino of any race were 0.6% of the population.

Out of the 1,052 households, 24.6% had children under the age of 18 living with them, 44.0% were married couples living together, 12.4% had a female householder with no husband present, 4.7% had a male householder with no wife present, and 39.0% were non-families. 34.9% of all households were made up of individuals, and 17.8% had someone living alone who was 65 years of age or older. The average household size was 2.25 and the average family size was 2.80.

The median age in the town was 42.8 years. 18.9% of residents were under the age of 18; 8.7% were between the ages of 18 and 24; 27.4% were from 25 to 44; 28.4% were from 45 to 64; and 16.6% were 65 years of age or older. The gender makeup of the town was 47.4% male and 52.6% female.

== Economy ==
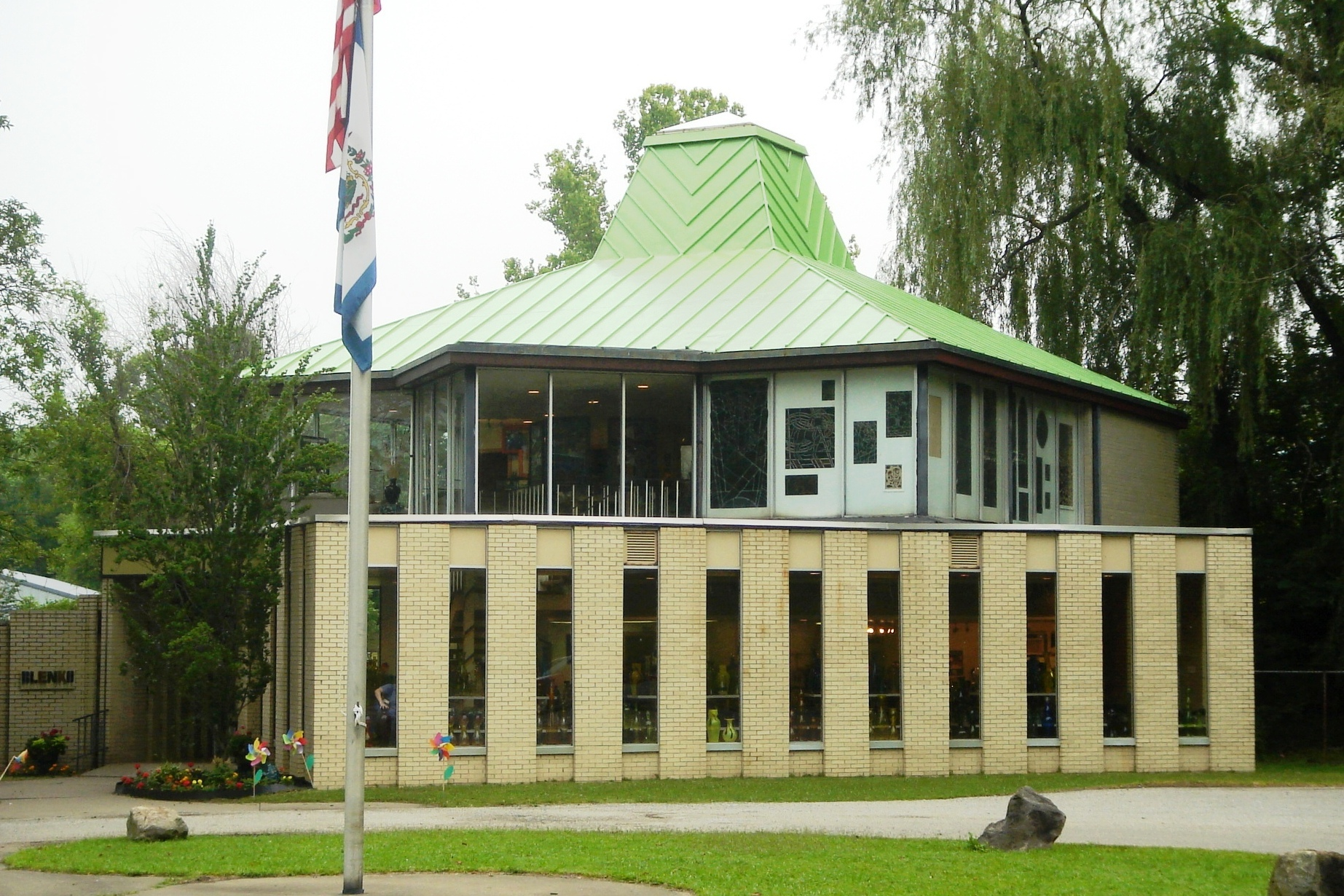
Blenko Glass visitor center

Blenko Glass Company is located in Milton.

== Arts and culture ==
Annual events include:

- Cabell County Fair
- Festival of Glass at Blenko Glass Company
- West Virginia Pumpkin Festival

Sites listed on the National Register of Historic Places include:

- Mud River Covered Bridge, in 2002, the bridge was moved to Pumpkin Park
- The former Morris Memorial Hospital for Crippled Children

== Education ==
Milton is served by the schools of the Cabell County Schools. Primary education is given at Milton Elementary, while middle school students attend Milton Middle School. High school students attend Cabell Midland High School, which opened in August 1994 upon the consolidation of Milton High School and Barboursville High School.

== Infrastructure ==
Milton holds the privately owned airport, Ona Airpark, serving the Huntington–Ashland metropolitan area.

== Notable people ==
- Katie Lee, food critic, former wife of Billy Joel, was raised in Milton.
- Breece D'J Pancake, short story author, was raised in Milton.
- Phillip Swann, known professionally as Phil Swann, singer, songwriter, actor, author, playwright, record producer, was raised in Milton.
- Morgan Zerkle, coach for Marshall Thundering Herd softball

== See also ==
- List of municipalities in West Virginia
