= Norfolk Southern Bridge (Kenova, West Virginia) =

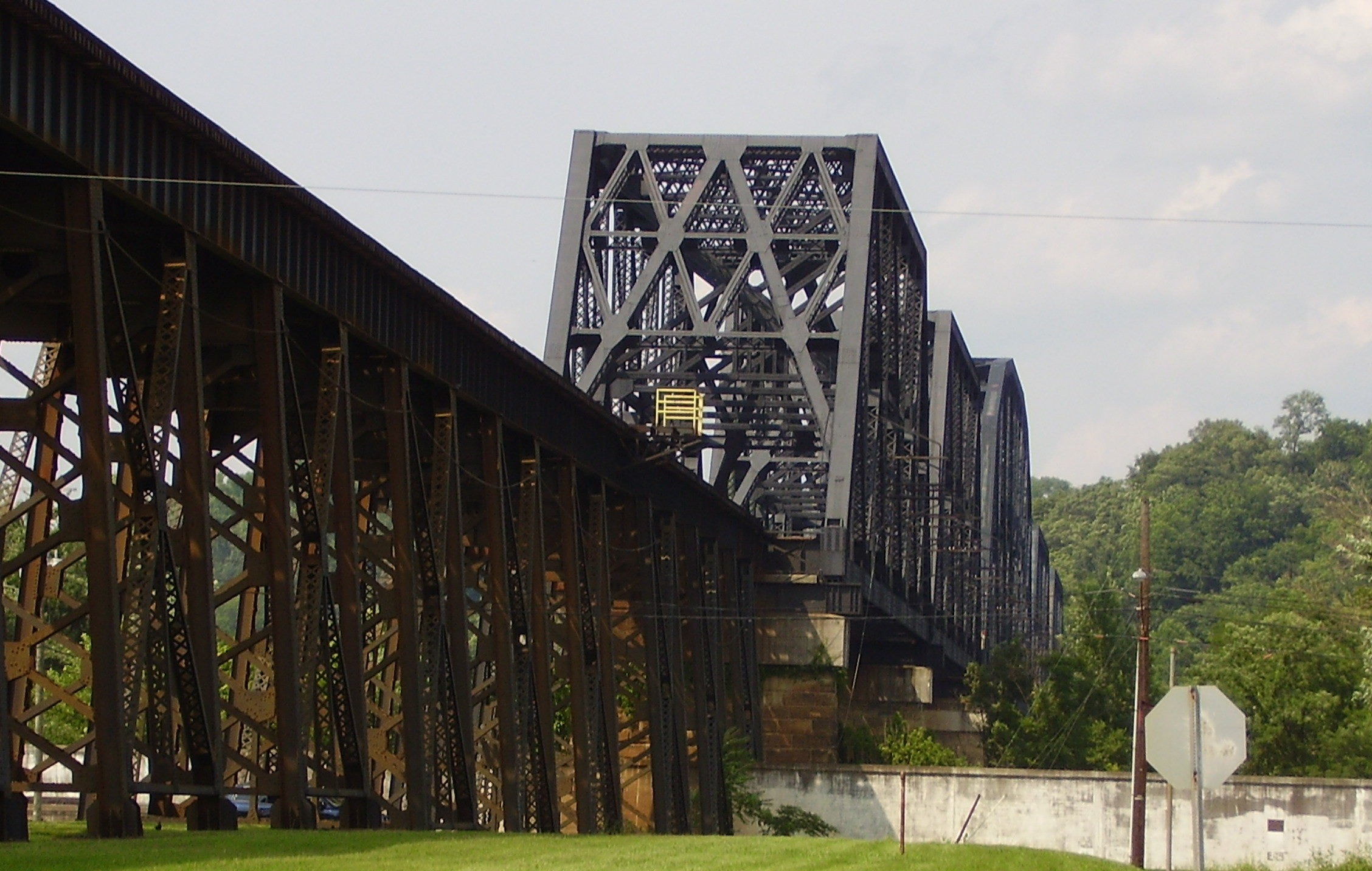
- The bridge as seen from Kenova, West Virginia in 2006
- Coordinates: 38°24′20″N 82°34′23″W
- Carries: Trackage of Norfolk Southern Railway
- Crosses: Ohio River
- Locale: South Point, Ohio and Kenova, West Virginia

Characteristics
- Design: Simple truss bridge

History
- Opened: 1892 (expanded 1913)

Location
- Interactive map of Norfolk Southern Bridge

The Norfolk Southern Railway Ohio River crossing connects South Point, Ohio with Kenova, West Virginia.

== History ==
The bridge was first completed in 1892 with a single track, but its piers were sized for future widening. The expansion to two tracks was undertaken in 1913 by Norfolk and Western, the predecessor railway of the current owner, Norfolk Southern. The railroad added new trusses around the existing structure and expanded the piers. Rail traffic continued throughout construction, and the new tracks opened on June 9, 1913.

On March 4, 2013, Norfolk Southern noted the 100th anniversary of the completion of the expanded bridge.

== Popular culture ==
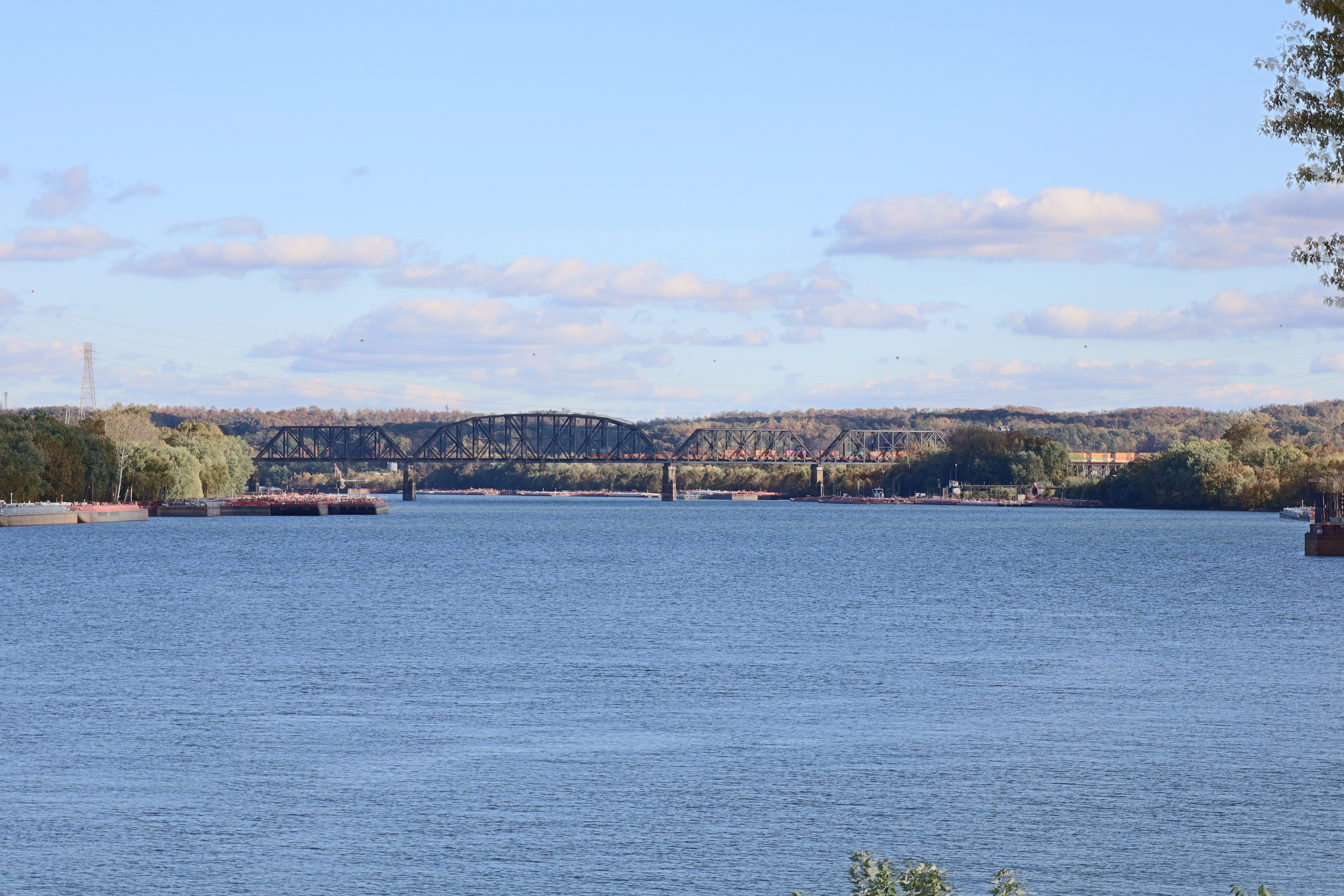
The bridge in 2023

The bridge is featured prominently in the Warner Bros. film We Are Marshall in a scene in which Jack Lengyel (played by Matthew McConaughey) visits William "Red" Dawson (played by Matthew Fox) at his home. The scene was filmed at a private residence on Barger Hill in Kenova, which overlooks the town and the three states converging at the confluence of the Ohio and Big Sandy Rivers. The bridge can be seen in the background. In the scene Lengyel makes reference to the train crossing it and uses it as an analogy for putting one's life back on track.

== See also ==
- List of crossings of the Ohio River
