= Norfolk Southern James River Trestle =

NS James River Trestle
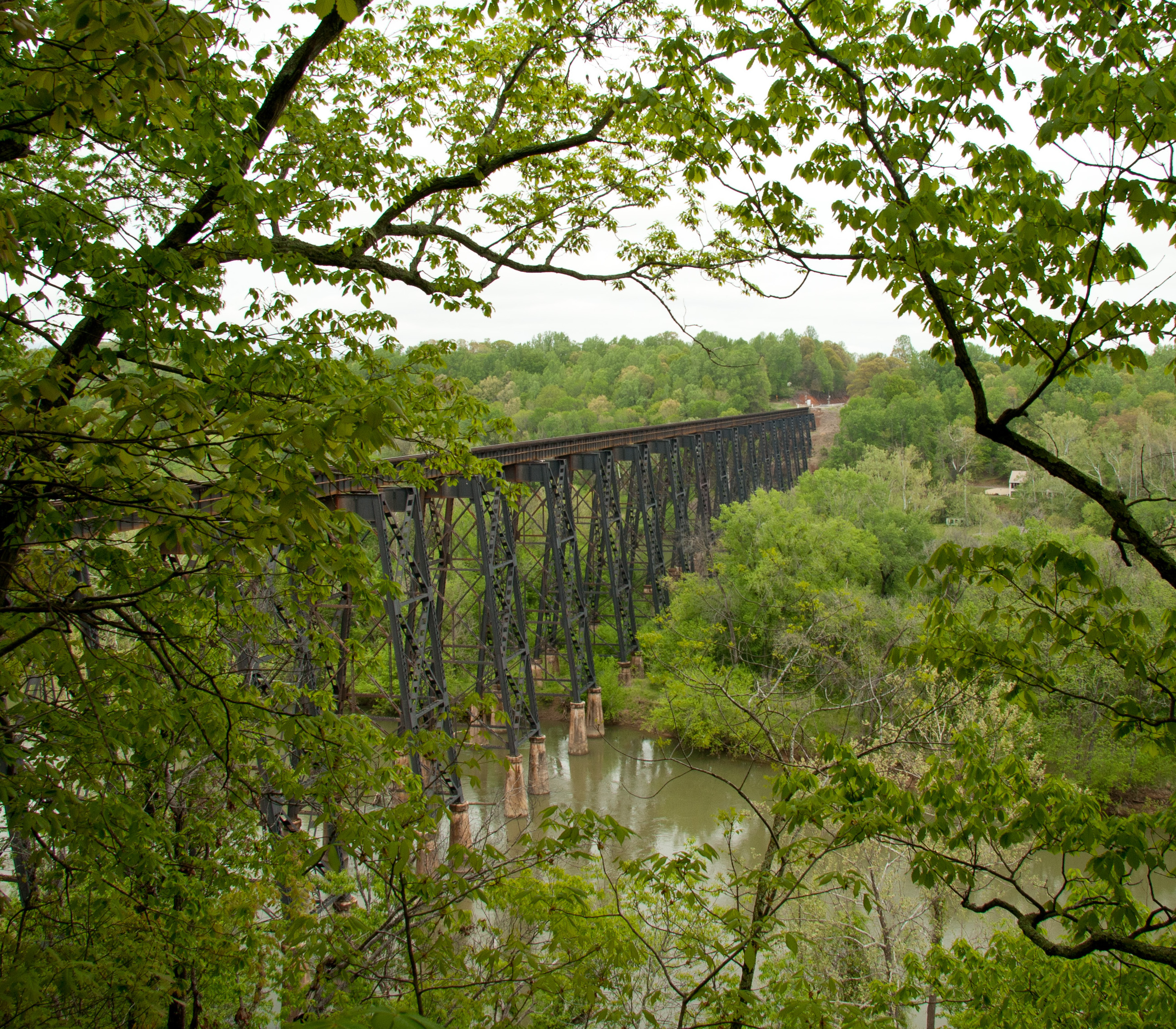
- View from the Riverside Park
- Coordinates: 37.4436°N 79.1655°W
- Crosses: James River
- Locale: Lynchburg, VA
- Owner: Norfolk Southern

Characteristics
- Design: Plate girder bridge
- Total length: 1860 ft (567m)
- Height: 200 ft (61 m)
- No. of spans: ~20

Rail characteristics
- No. of tracks: 1911-1962: 2 tracks 1962-now: 1 track
- Track gauge: 4 ft 8.5 in (1435mm)
- Electrified: No

History
- Built: 1911
- Opening: March 1, 1911(Freight) April 16, 1911(Passenger)

Location
- Interactive map of NS James River Trestle

The Norfolk Southern James River Trestle is a railroad bridge that crosses the James River in Lynchburg, VA. Built and owned by Southern Railway in 1911, the bridge is now owned by Norfolk Southern Railway and is part of the Washington District, which runs between Alexandria, VA and Lynchburg, VA. The bridge was built as part of the Southern Railway's "Lynchburg cut-off" project, which bypassed the original line of the railroad that ran through downtown Lynchburg. Three other bridges were also built with the project, including Blackwater Creek trestle, Fishing Creek trestle, and the Harris Creek trestle. In 1962, Southern Railway removed double track from the bridge.

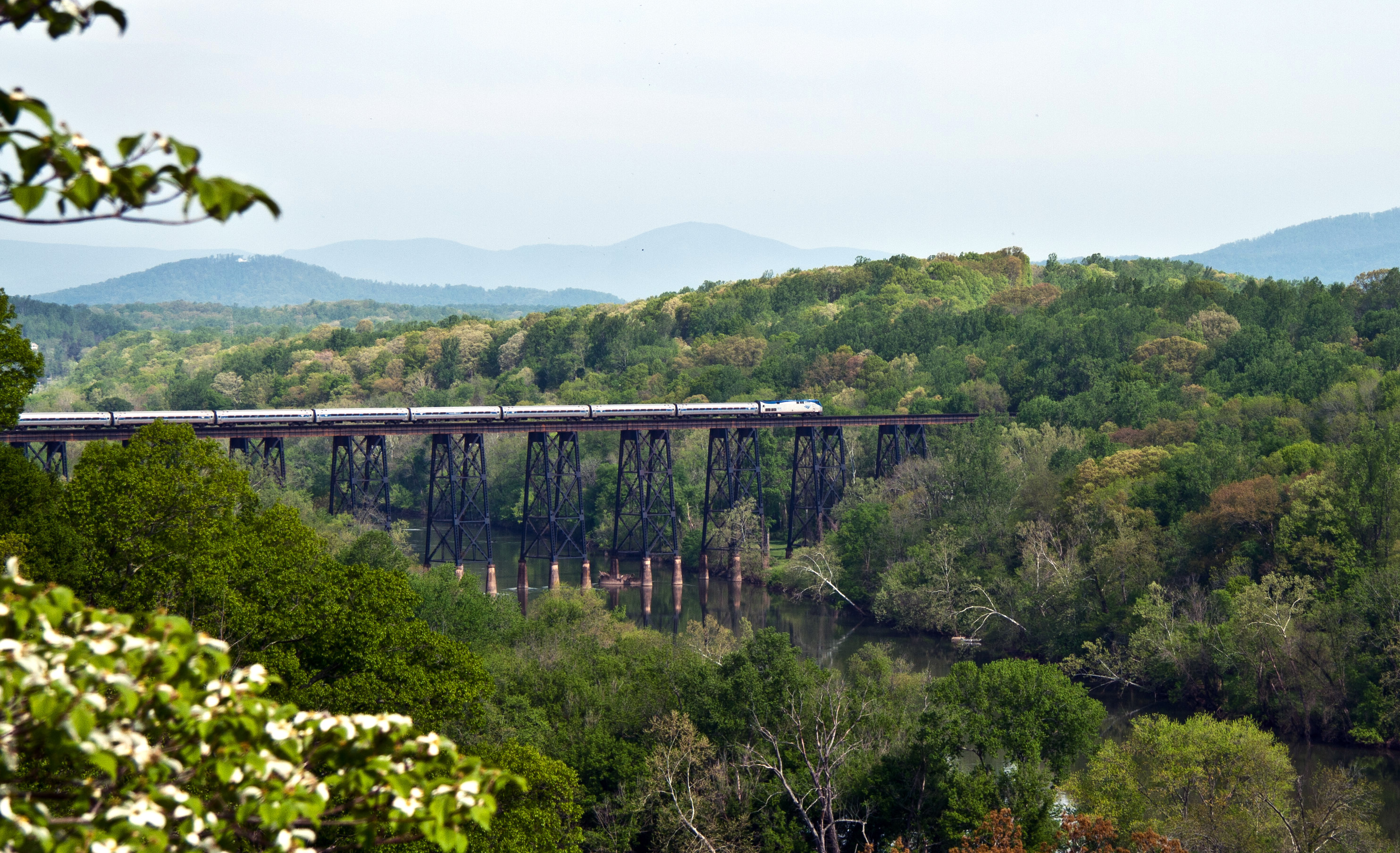
A northbound Amtrak train on the bridge

The bridge is crossed by around 20 freight trains each day. Six Amtrak trains, including 2 long-distance Crescent trains and 4 inter-city Northeast Regional trains, cross the bridge daily. The bridge has a speed limit of 40 mph (64km/h).

The James River trestle is a popular railfan spot, with its massive height (200 feet) and the scenic James River valley. Several notable trains have crossed the bridge, including the Flying Scotsman and the N&W 611. The nearby Riverside Park is a fequented vantage point.

== Incidents ==
Many trespassing incidents have occurred since its completion, most recently in 2021. According to the Blue Ridge Railway Historical Society, at least 21 fatalities, near-misses, or injuries have occurred since opening. At least 13 people (mostly college students) have died since 1969, many from being forced off the bridge by incoming trains due to limited space on the trestle. Local communities still debate over the safety of the bridge, as well as means of deterring trespassers. Since Norfolk Southern owns the tracks, local governments doesn't have the authority to make the bridge safer.
