= Littleton, West Virginia =

- Census-designated place (CDP)
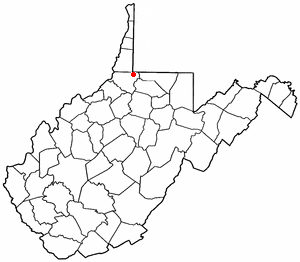
- Location of Littleton, West Virginia
- Coordinates: 39°42′5″N 80°30′57″W
- Country: United States
- State: West Virginia
- County: Wetzel

Area
  - Total: 0.66 sq mi (1.7 km^{2})
  - Land: 0.66 sq mi (1.7 km^{2})
  - Water: 0 sq mi (0.0 km^{2})
- Elevation: 925 ft (282 m)

Population (2020)
  - Total: 103
  - Density: 160/sq mi (61/km^{2})
- Time zone: UTC-5 (Eastern (EST))
  - Summer (DST): UTC-4 (EDT)
- ZIP code: 26581
- Area code: 304
- FIPS code: 54-47788
- GNIS feature ID: 1542266

Littleton is a census-designated place (CDP) in Wetzel County, West Virginia, United States. The population was 103 at the 2020 census.

== History ==
Some say the community derives its name from William Little, a pioneer settler, while others believe it was named after Harrison Little, a local reverend. Littleton was formerly an incorporated town and was dissolved in 2004.

== Geography ==
Littleton is located at 39°42′5″N 80°30′57″W (39.701505, -80.515936).

According to the United States Census Bureau, the town had a total area of 0.7 square miles (1.7 km^{2}), all land.

== Demographics ==
Historical population
Census	Pop.	Note	%±
2000	207		—
2010	198		−4.3%
2020	103		−48.0%
U.S. Decennial Census

As of the census of 2000, there were 207 people, 73 households, and 48 families residing in the town. The population density was 1,149.1 inhabitants per square mile (444.0/km^{2}). There were 98 housing units at an average density of 544.0 per square mile (210.2/km^{2}). The racial makeup of the town was 96.62% White, and 3.38% from two or more races. Hispanic or Latino of any race were 0.48% of the population.

There were 73 households, out of which 37.0% had children under the age of 18 living with them, 37.0% were married couples living together, 16.4% had a female householder with no husband present, and 32.9% were non-families. 30.1% of all households were made up of individuals, and 16.4% had someone living alone who was 65 years of age or older. The average household size was 2.84 and the average family size was 3.41.

In the town the population was spread out, with 35.7% under the age of 18, 8.7% from 18 to 24, 26.6% from 25 to 44, 15.9% from 45 to 64, and 13.0% who were 65 years of age or older. The median age was 30 years. For every 100 females, there were 99.0 males. For every 100 females age 18 and over, there were 95.6 males.

The median income for a household in the town was $15,714, and the median income for a family was $15,469. Males had a median income of $20,417 versus $22,500 for females. The per capita income for the town was $6,036, which is the lowest in the state. About 52.7% of families and 64.6% of the population were below the poverty line, including 83.5% of those under the age of eighteen and 30.8% of those 65 or over.
