= Fairmont Subdivision =

Railway line in West Virginia

Overview
- Status: Active
- Owner: CSX Transportation
- Locale: West Virginia
- Termini: Grafton; Rivesville

Service
- Type: Freight rail
- System: CSX Transportation
- Operator(s): CSX Transportation

Technical
- Number of tracks: 1-2
- Track gauge: 4 ft 8 1/2 in (1,435 mm) standard gauge

The Fairmont Subdivision is a railroad line owned and operated by CSX Transportation in the U.S. state of West Virginia. The line runs from Grafton northwest to Rivesville along the old Baltimore and Ohio Rail Road main line and a former branch of it.

At its southeast end, the Fairmont Subdivision junctions with the Mountain Subdivision near its west end, where it becomes the Bridgeport Subdivision. The northwest end is at a junction with the Norfolk Southern Railway's Loveridge Secondary, along which CSX has trackage rights north to the Mon Subdivision near Brownsville, Pennsylvania.

== History ==
The majority of the Fairmont Subdivision, from Grafton to Fairmont, was opened in 1852 as part of the B&O's main line. A short piece in Fairmont opened around 1890 as part of the Fairmont, Morgantown and Pittsburgh Railroad. The entire line became part of the B&O and CSX through leases and mergers.
