= Armourdale, Kansas City, Kansas =

Neighborhood of Kansas City, Kansas

Coordinates: 39°04′59.42″N 94°38′06.77″W

Armourdale community is a district in the lower part of the Kansas River valley in Kansas City, Kansas. It is a main district between the West Bottoms and the Rosedale, Kansas area. The Kansas River makes an oxbow curve around the entire district, which is home to Shawnee Park and Bill Clem Park.

== History ==
Armourdale was platted in 1880, and incorporated as a city in 1882. Its name came from the Armour meatpacking plant in the area.

In March 1886, "new" Kansas City, Kansas was formed through the consolidation of five municipalities: "old" Kansas City, Armstrong, Armourdale, Riverview, Wyandotte.

The district was devastated by the 1903 Kansas City flood, and again in the flood of 1951, with damage adding up to about 50 million dollars that year. The 1993 flood, however, did no damage as the new floodwalls held up, and protected Armourdale from waters.

== Bridges ==
- 23rd Street viaduct turns into Kansas Avenue right after the viaduct at the east end of the district.
- 7th Street Trafficway Bridge runs 7th Street straight through the district over the Kansas River.
- 12th Street Bridge runs from the south side of the district, to the Argentine district over the Kansas River.
- 18th Street Expressway Bridge this bridge however, never goes through Armourdale, but goes over the top of it, Kansas Avenue exit is the only exit into the district from the 18th Street Expressway.
- Kansas Avenue Bridge (West) this bridge is at the very west end of the district, and carries Kansas Avenue straight through.
- 10th Street Bridge (North) this bridge connects the Central Avenue district to Northern Armourdale.
- Mill Street Bridge (North) this bridge connects the St. Joseph/St. Benedict Polish/Mexican community to Northern Armourdale.
