= List of trestle bridges =

This is a list of trestle bridges.

== United States ==
The United States once had many; now some survive and are listed on the National Register of Historic Places (NRHP).

- Arboretum Sewer Trestle (1910), Seattle, Washington, NRHP-listed
- Adamson Bridge (1916), Cherry County, Nebraska, timber stringer trestle bridge built by the Canton Bridge Co. Formerly NRHP-listed.
- Baltimore & Ohio Railroad Bridge, Antietam Creek, Maryland
- Bridge A 249, New Mexico
- Chacahoula Swamp Bridge (1995), Louisiana
- Clio Trestle, California
- CNR Bonnet Carré Spillway-McComb Bridge, Louisiana
- CRRNJ Newark Bay Bridge, New Jersey
- Benewah Lake Bridge, Idaho
- Chesapeake Bay Bridge–Tunnel
- Dale Creek Crossing
- Delta Trestle Bridge, Maryland and Pennsylvania Railroad, Delta, Pennsylvania, NRHP-listed
- Doe Run Trestle, Springfield, Kentucky, NRHP-listed
- D & RG Narrow Gauge Trestle, Cimarron, Colorado, NRHP-listed
- Dumbarton Rail Bridge, California
- Fairfax Bridge (Washington)
- Genesee Arch Bridge
- Hampton Roads Bridge–Tunnel
- Hoover-Mason Trestle
- I-10 Bonnet Carré Spillway Bridge
- I-10 Twin Span Bridge
- Kinzua Bridge
- LaBranche Wetlands Bridge
- Lake Pontchartrain Causeway, Louisiana
- Lewisville Lake Toll Bridge
- Little Pipe Creek bridge and viaduct
- Louisiana Highway 1 Bridge, Louisiana
- Lucin Cutoff
- Lyman Viaduct
- Magnolia Bridge
- Manchac Swamp Bridge
- Maroon Creek Bridge
- Merrill P. Barber Bridge
- Mexican Canyon Trestle, Cloudcroft, New Mexico, NRHP-listed
- Minnesota and International Railway Trestle at Blackduck (1901-02), Minnesota
- Monitor–Merrimac Memorial Bridge–Tunnel
- Moodna Viaduct
- Norfolk Southern Lake Pontchartrain Bridge
- Old Youngs Bay Bridge
- Peninsula Subdivision Trestle
- Pleasure Beach Bridge
- Porter Hollow Embankment and Culvert
- Rapallo Viaduct
- Richmond–San Rafael Bridge, California
- Rivanna Subdivision Trestle
- Robert Moses Causeway
- Rock Island Railroad Bridge (Columbia River)
- Rosendale Trestle
- Safe Harbor Bridge
- Salisbury Viaduct
- San Luis Southern Railway Trestle, Blanca, Colorado, NRHP-listed
- San Mateo–Hayward Bridge, California
- Santa Fe Arroyo Seco Railroad Bridge
- Southern Pacific Railroad: Ogden-Lucin Cut-Off Trestle, Ogden, Utah, NRHP-listed
- State Highway 274 Bridge
- St. Francis River Bridge (Lake City, Arkansas)
- Sulphur Trestle Fort Site, Elkmont, Alabama, NRHP-listed
- Susitna River Bridge
- Transcontinental Railroad Grade
- Trestles Bridge
- Triple Crossing
- Tulip Viaduct
- Union Street Railroad Bridge and Trestle, near Salem, Oregon, NRHP-listed
- U.S. 61 Bonnet Carré Spillway Bridge, Louisiana
- Verrazano Bridge (Maryland)
- Warrens Bridge (c. 1930), Arkansas
- West James Street Overpass (1924), Redfield, Arkansas
- Wilburton Trestle (1904), Washington
- Wills Canyon Spur Trestle, Cloudcroft, New Mexico, NRHP-listed
