= Church Hill Tunnel =

Tunnel abandoned due to collapse in Richmond, Virginia

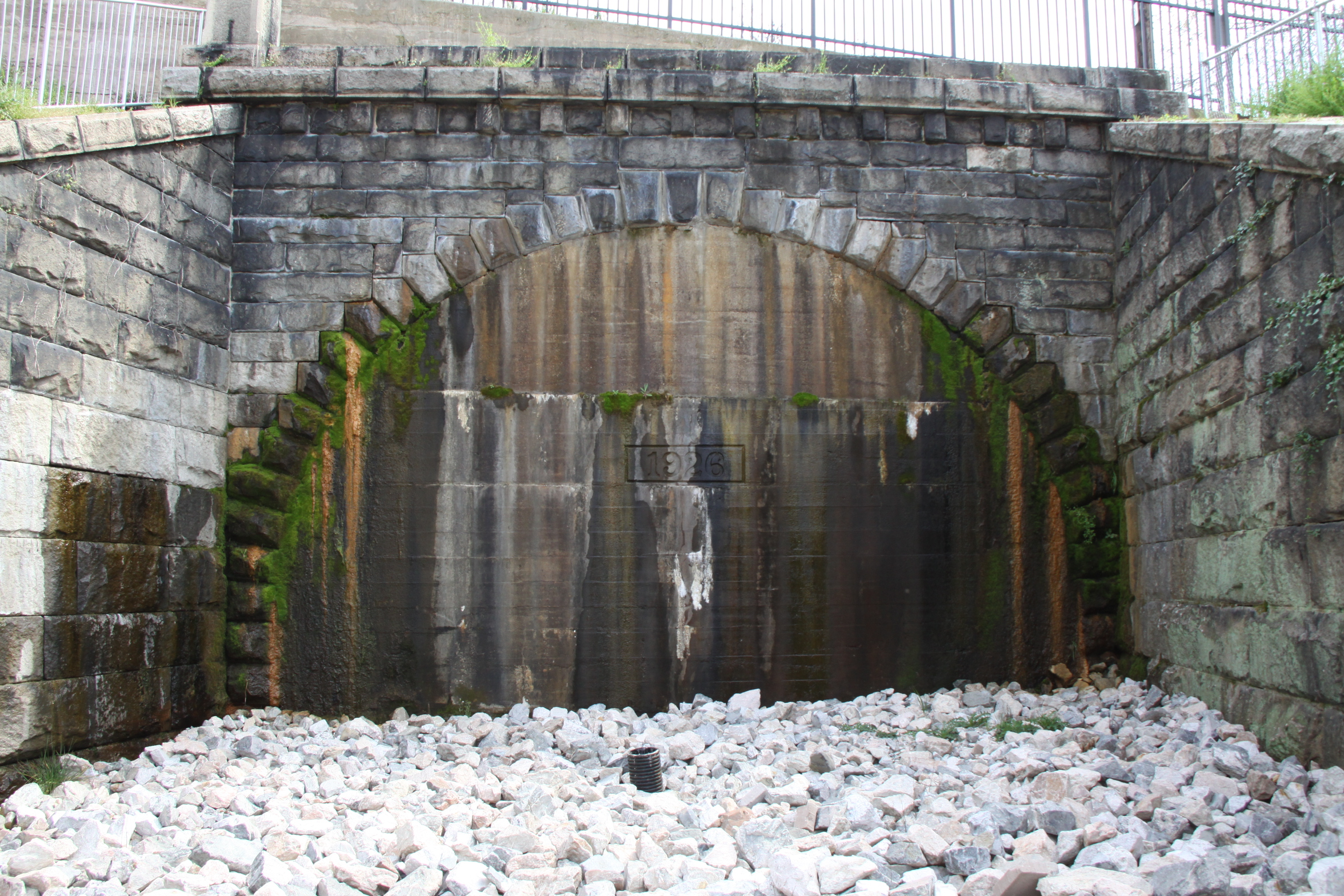
- The sealed western portal to the Church Hill Tunnel
- Interactive map of Church Hill Tunnel

Overview
- Line: Chesapeake and Ohio Railway (C&O)
- Location: Richmond, Virginia, U.S.
- Status: Unsafe, sealed
- Start: 37.5361782110294°N 77.42324092557604°W
- End: 37.52714727530222°N 77.41498622454112°W

Operation
- Opened: 1873
- Closed: 1925
- Owner: CSX Transportation

Technical
- Line length: approximately 4,000 ft (1,200 m)
- No. of tracks: none at present
- Track gauge: 4 ft 8 1/2 in (1,435 mm)

Church Hill Tunnel is an old Chesapeake and Ohio Railway (C&O) tunnel, built in the early 1870s, which extends approximately 4,000 feet (1,200 meters) under the Church Hill district of Richmond, Virginia, United States. On October 2, 1925, the tunnel collapsed on a work train, killing four men and trapping a steam locomotive and ten flat cars. Rescue efforts only resulted in further collapse, and the tunnel was eventually sealed for safety reasons.

Portions of the tunnel have continued to wreak havoc above in the years since, and several houses and a wall of a church have been destroyed by sinkholes near 25th and Broad Streets. More recently, tennis courts and the wall of a house seem to have become victims farther east. Long the subject of community speculation and trespassing incidents at its eastern portal, the tunnel is owned by the C&O's successor entity, CSX Transportation.

The tunnel, which is still considered dangerous, was featured in a 1998 newspaper article by Richmond Times-Dispatch reporter Mark Holmberg and photographer P. Kevin Morley, who explored portions from the eastern portal with professional caving personnel and equipment. Efforts to unseal the tunnel and extract the buried work train have been unsuccessful.

== History ==
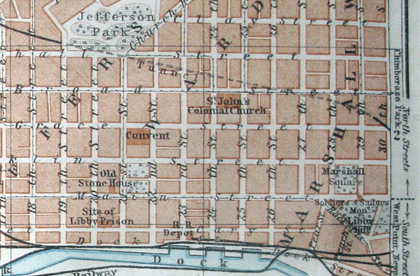
Church Hill Tunnel route

=== Purpose ===
Church Hill Tunnel was completed in 1873 for the Chesapeake and Ohio Railway (C&O), which was seeking to extend its trackage (of the former Virginia Central Railroad) from a terminus in the Shockoe Valley section of Richmond to connect with their Peninsula Subdivision extending approximately 75 miles (120 km) southeast down the Virginia Peninsula to reach Collis Potter Huntington's coal pier in Newport News. The tracks to the tunnel left the old Virginia Central line west of 17th Street and curved southeasterly to enter the tunnel east of N. 18th Street and north of E. Marshall Street under Cedar Street, on the western slope of what is technically Union Hill. The east end of the tunnel appeared just north of Williamsburg Road near 31st Street, below Libby Terrace Park. The Peninsula Subdivision was completed and opened in late 1881, and the coal flowed eastward for export in massive quantities.

=== Construction problems ===
The construction of the tunnel was problematic. Unlike the bedrock through which the C&O carved its western tunnels, Richmond's blue marl clay shrink-swell soil tended to change with rainfall and groundwater, causing deadly cave-ins during the construction. The tunnel has remained troublesome throughout its life due to groundwater seepage and safety concerns, even after abandonment in 1925.

=== Safer alternative ===
In the 1890s, the C&O acquired the Richmond and Alleghany Railroad (R&A) which had been built east from the Blue Ridge Mountains along the towpath of the James River and Kanawha Canal. This provided an alternate "water level" route to Richmond following the north bank of the James River and avoided a more circuitous route which crossed the North Mountain and Afton Mountain via the Blue Ridge Tunnel, reaching Richmond via the former Virginia Central Railroad. However, the R&A terminated at Richmond's Byrd Street Station in the downtown area (7th and Canal Streets), and did not have a track connection to the C&O which ended at Shockoe Bottom at Broad Street, some distance away. The Virginia State Capitol and its grounds were directly between the two terminals, so creativity for a less direct connection was needed.

To utilize the new "water level" line to ship coal to Newport News, and to avoid the troublesome tunnel as an added benefit, the C&O constructed a 3-mile-long (4.8 km) double-track elevated viaduct along the riverfront extending between the area of Hollywood Cemetery east past downtown Richmond, the Shockoe Valley, and Church Hill to join the Peninsula Subdivision at what became Fulton Yard east of the tunnel. With a connection just south of the new Main Street Station, it was now possible for traffic to come off the old Virginia Central and enter the Peninsula Subdivision without using the Church Hill Tunnel.

Portions of the viaduct became known as the Rivanna Subdivision Trestle (west of Rivanna Junction) and Peninsula Subdivision Trestle (from the former Brown Street Yard through Main Street Station and Rivanna Junction east to Fulton Yard). The viaduct is believed to be the longest in the United States and is still in use by CSX Transportation, the successor entity to the C&O, which also owns the abandoned tunnel. The viaduct is also the highest level of Richmond's famed Triple Crossing, with railroads at three levels, believed to be only one of two such places in the world, near where it crosses Richmond's flood wall.

=== Tunnel disuse, rehabilitation turns tragic ===
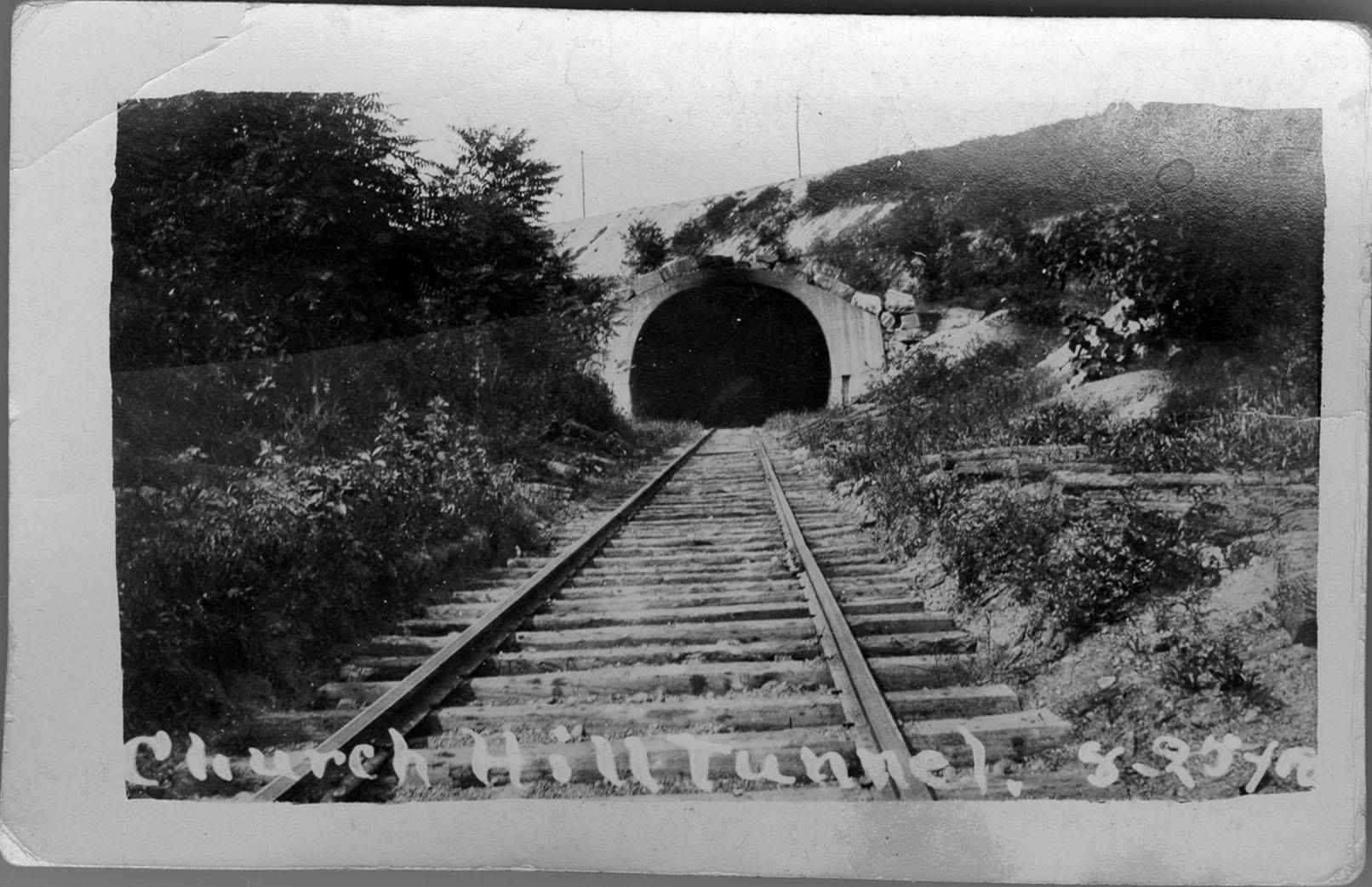
The eastern entrance to the Church Hill Tunnel showing the collapsed roof at top.

After completion of the viaduct in 1901, the Church Hill Tunnel fell into disuse for over 20 years. In 1925, to add capacity, the railroad began efforts to restore it to usable condition. On October 2, while repairs were under way, a work train was trapped by a collapse of 150 feet (45.72 m) of the tunnel near the western end, below Jefferson Park (close to the intersection of N. 18th Street and E. Marshall). The authorities shut down the streetcar line to the area for several days. At that time there were no homes in the area, as most buildings were around 25th and Broad near Nolde Brothers Bakery where the tunnel crossed the middle of Church Hill.

Approximately 200 workmen crawled under flat cars and then escaped out the eastern end of the tunnel, including the fireman Benjamin F. Mosby (who died hours later at Grace Hospital because of burns caused by the ruptured boiler), but the engineer Thomas Joseph Mason was killed; initial reports claimed that, besides Mason, six black laborers were unaccounted for, although the missing number of men was later scaled down to two, identified as day laborers Richard Lewis and "H. Smith". During the next week, the community anxiously watched rescue efforts, but each time progress was made, further cave-ins occurred; only the body of Mason was recovered, on October 10. At that point, only Lewis and Smith were still unaccounted for. Their bodies were never found.

The following spring, the Virginia State Corporation Commission, which regulated the state's railroads, ordered the western end of the tunnel sealed for safety reasons. Left inside was the work train, complete with a 4-4-0 steam locomotive (C&O switch engine no. 231) and ten flat cars.

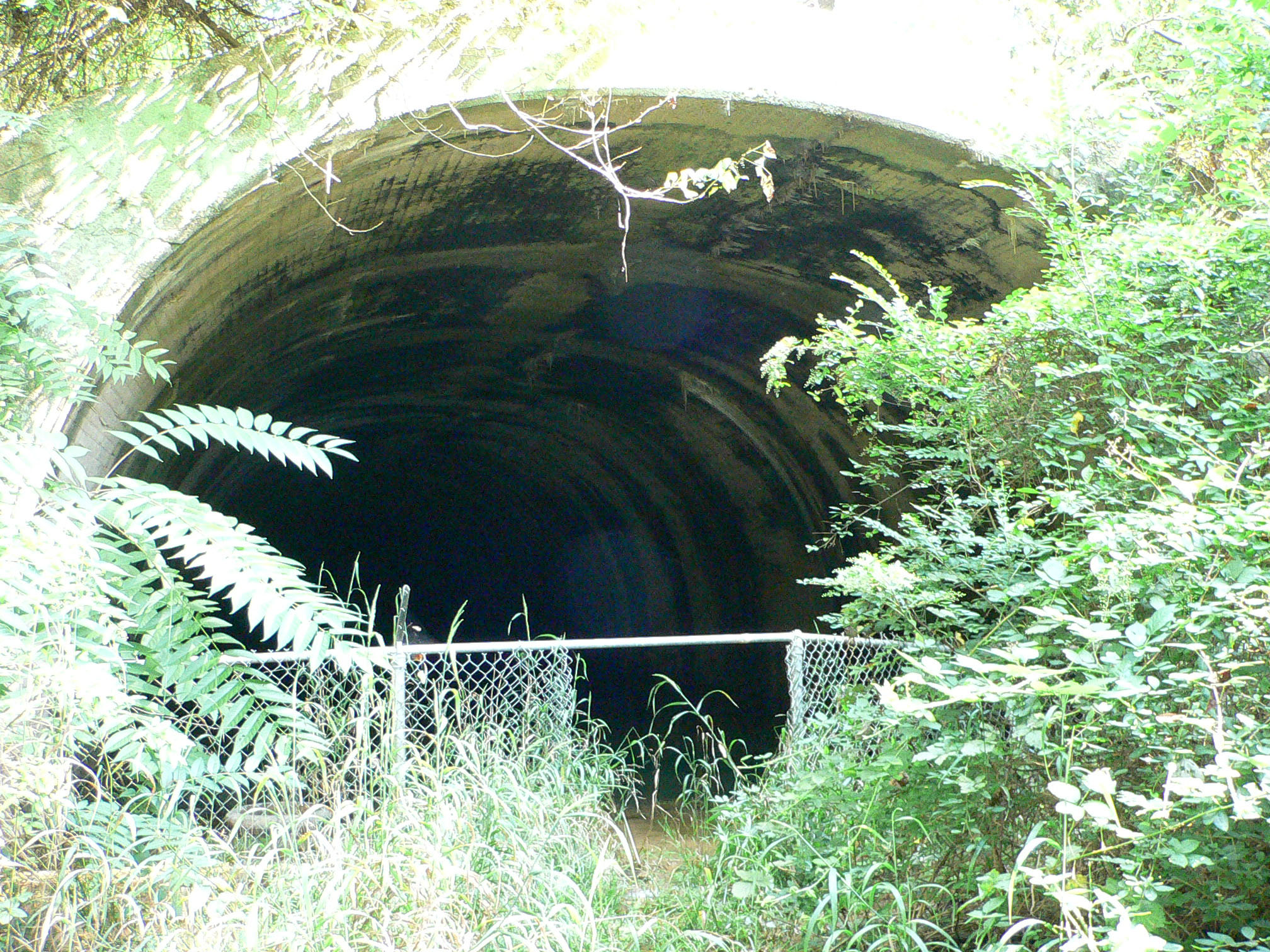
The east entrance to the tunnel in 2010.

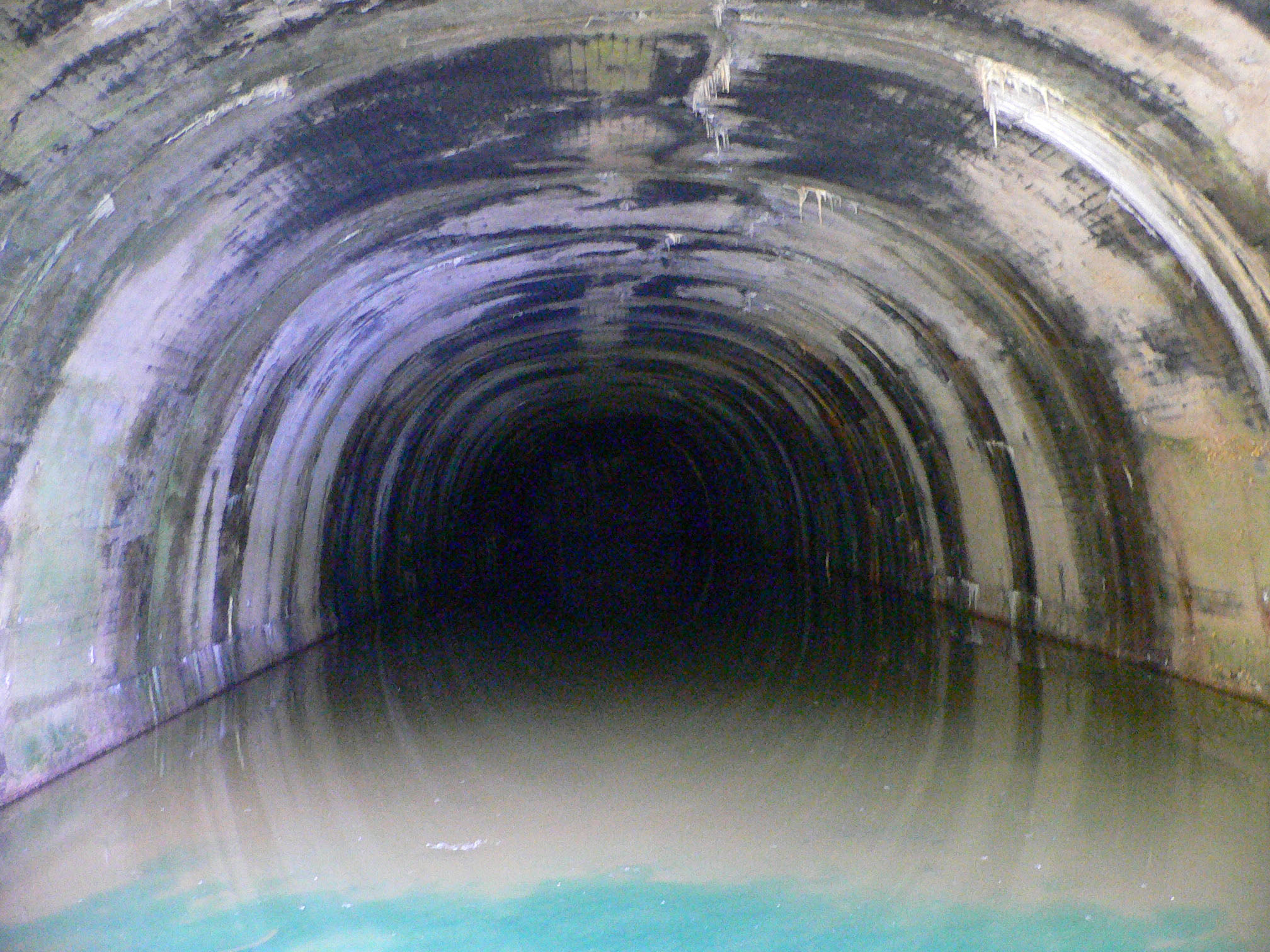
Looking northwest into the tunnels east entrance in 2010. The floor is under several inches of water. The tunnel is sealed off by a wall some distance in from the entrance, barely visible in this photo.

== Later years ==
The western end is covered with a concrete plug, but for years, the eastern end was used as part of a turning wye for a connection with the Southern Railway's line to West Point and could be entered by venturesome trespassers. Based upon a 1998 exploratory expedition by Richmond Times-Dispatch reporter Mark Holmberg, who explored portions from the eastern end with professional caving personnel and equipment, it is believed that most of the western portion of the tunnel which has not caved in is filled with water. The western entrance can still be seen at the southeast end of an alley off of 18th Street, just north of Marshall. A Virginia historical marker was placed at the site in 2012. The eastern end is hidden in a small, dense thicket of brush just north of the intersection of E. Franklin and N. 31st Streets. This end of the tunnel is still open for some distance, but its floor and the area outside are swampy.

== Recovery discussions ==
In June 2006, the Virginia Historical Society and other parties announced that they were investigating the possibility of recovering the train and bodies; the society planned to keep the train for preservation. The History Channel expressed interest in participating in the project. However, when a hole was drilled through the tunnel's seal and a camera was placed inside, the tunnel was discovered to be filled with silt and water, meaning that an excavation of the tunnel would likely cause it to further collapse and cause several homes on Church Hill to be engulfed by massive sinkholes. The project was put on hold.

== Urban legend ==
The Church Hill Tunnel also has been attached to the urban legend of the Richmond Vampire.
