= Argentine Bridge =

Argentine Boulevard Bridge
- Coordinates: 39.0796°N 94.6524°W
- Carries: 1 lane of Argentine Boulevard, 18th Street
- Crosses: Kansas River
- Locale: Kansas City, Kansas

Characteristics
- Design: Thru-Truss

History
- Opened: 1908
- Closed: 1959

Location
- Interactive map of Argentine Boulevard Bridge

The Argentine Bridge was a one lane, thru-truss bridge over the Kansas River in Kansas City, Kansas. It was built in 1908, and removed in 1959, after the 18th Street Expressway Bridge was built to the east of it. It was damaged in the flood of 1951, after being crushed by a large oil tanker that floated from a field near the Kansas Avenue Bridge (West). After the flood, it never reopened, but was left in place until the replacement bridge was built. Today, a fallen pier is all that remains of the bridge, when the water in the river is low, it can be seen from the 18th Street Expressway Bridge when going southbound.
