= Chicago Junction =

Chicago Junction may refer to:

- Chicago Junction Railway, a terminal railway in Chicago, Illinois
- Chicago Junction, a previous name for Willard, Ohio
- Chicago Junction or North Chicago Junction, an active railroad infrastructure below the Highline Bridge in Kansas City
- Chicago Junction, the World's Columbian Exposition's Jackson Park station
- Chicago Junction, a previous name for Spooner, Wisconsin
- North Chicago Junction, a junction and exchange station of the Chicago North Shore and Milwaukee Railroad
