= Armourdale =

Armourdale may refer to:

- Armourdale, Kansas
- Armourdale (electoral district)
