= 12th Street Bridge =

12th Street Kansas River Bridge
- Coordinates: 39.0733°N 94.6401°W
- Carries: 2 lanes of 12th Street
- Crosses: Kansas River
- Locale: Kansas City, Kansas
- Maintained by: WyCo Unified Government

Characteristics
- Design: Deck Truss (first bridge), Thru-Truss (second bridge,) Girder (current bridge)

History
- Opened: 1909 (first bridge), 1930 (second bridge), 2000 (third and current bridge)

Location
- Interactive map of 12th Street Kansas River Bridge

The 12th Street Bridge is an automobile crossing of the Kansas River in Kansas City, Kansas.

== History ==
The 12th Street Bridge dates back to the early 1900s, when it was an iron bridge. Swept away by a 1903 flood, it was rebuilt at the cost of $75,000. A judge ordered the bridge rebuilt again in 1923 and it was reopened April 22, 1926.

A 1940 fire damaged the center span of the bridge and its wooden floor fell into the river. In about a year, it reopened after being rebuilt.

In 2000, the thru-truss was removed and replaced with a girder, due to problems with the substructure. It is just west of the 7th Street Trafficway Bridge, and east of the 18th Street Expressway Bridge over the Kansas River.
