= Kansas Avenue =

Kansas Avenue can refer to:

- Kansas Avenue (Washington, D.C.)
- Kansas Avenue, ending at the 23rd Street viaduct between Kansas City, Kansas, and Kansas City, Missouri, in the U.S.
