= Highline Bridge (Kansas City, Kansas) =

Double-deck railroad bridge in Kansas City

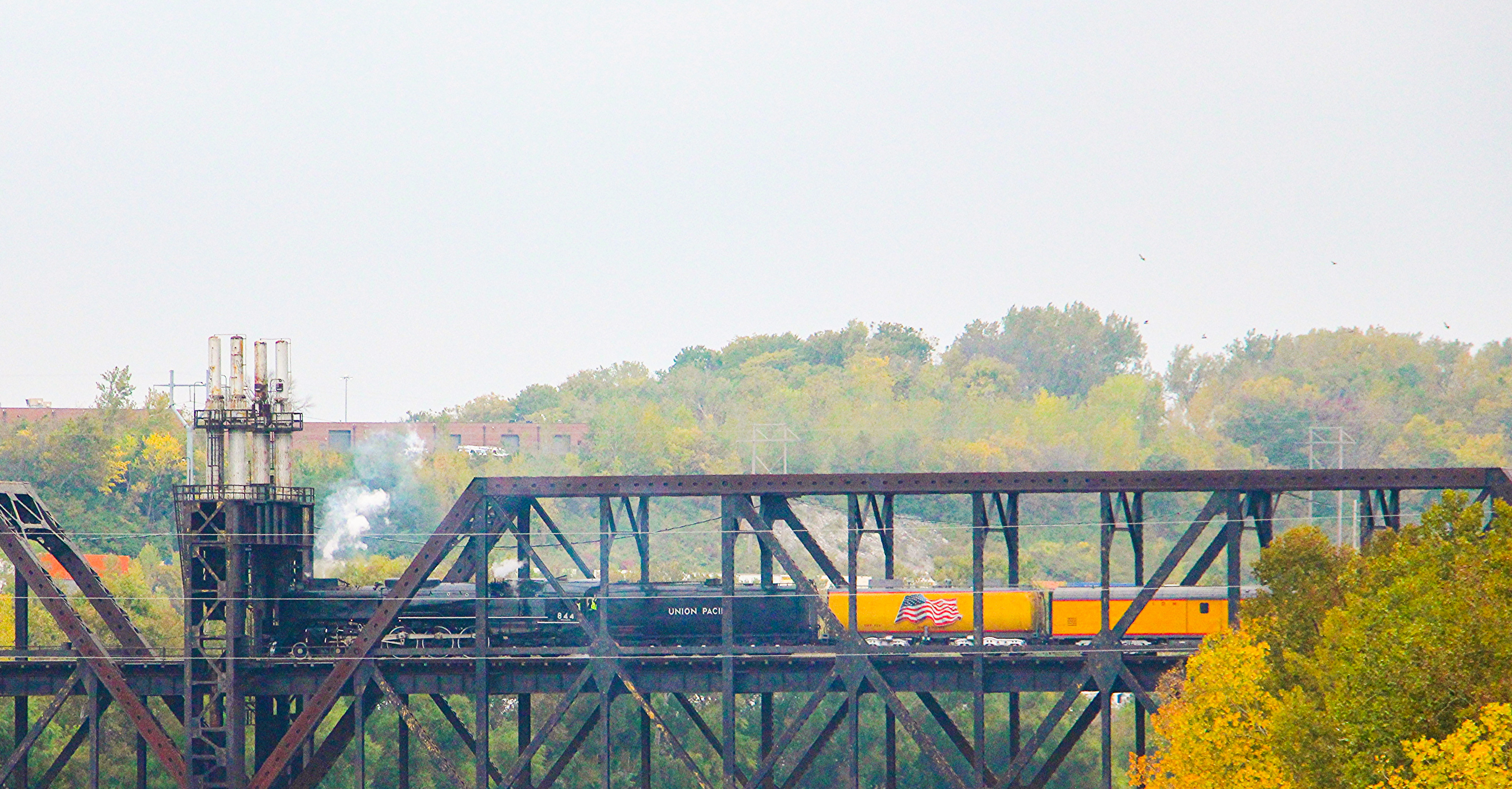
- Highline Bridge with Union Pacific 844 as seen from the Kansas Avenue Bridge, October 2016
- Coordinates: 39.0843°N 94.6108°W
- Carries: Four tracks of the Kansas City Terminal Railway (KCTR); two on each level
- Crosses: Kansas River, Armourdale District
- Locale: Kansas City, Kansas
- Maintained by: BNSF Railway

Characteristics
- Design: Two level thru-truss, deck truss

History
- Opened: 1919

Location
- Interactive map of Highline Bridge

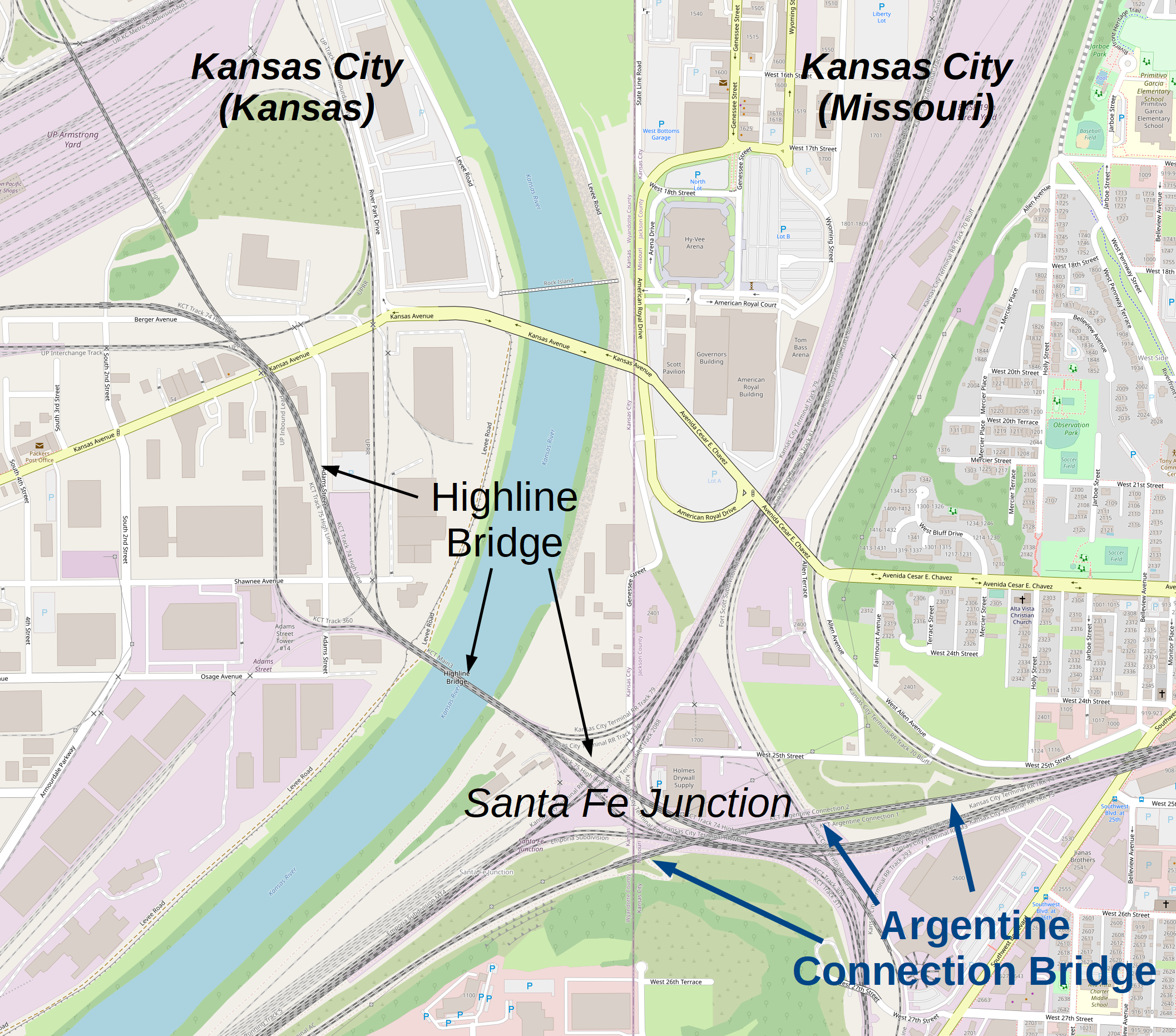
Overview of the KCTR's Highline-Santa Fe Jct.-Argentine Connection complex

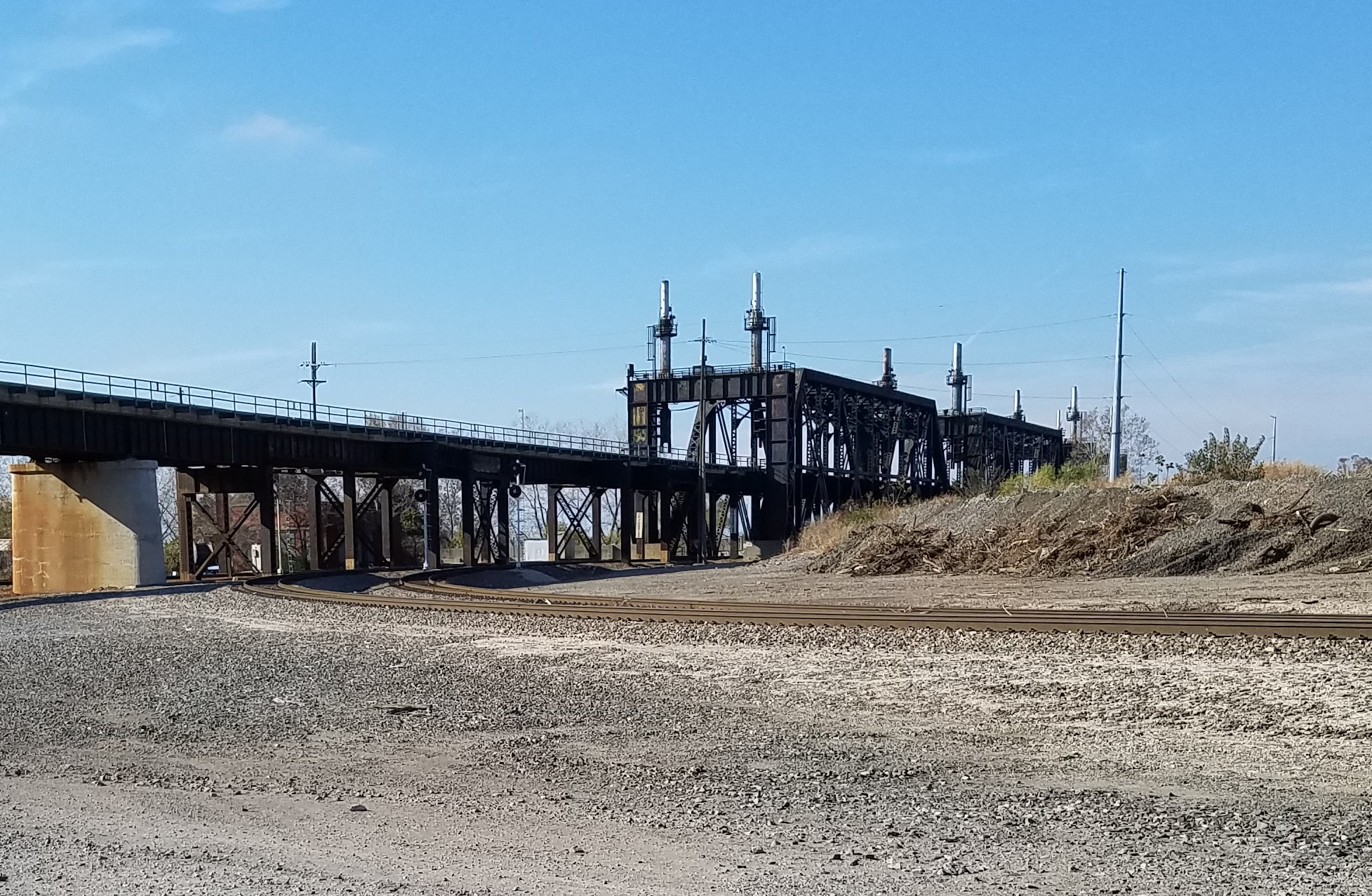
Southeast approach of the Highline Bridge from Stateline Road crossing

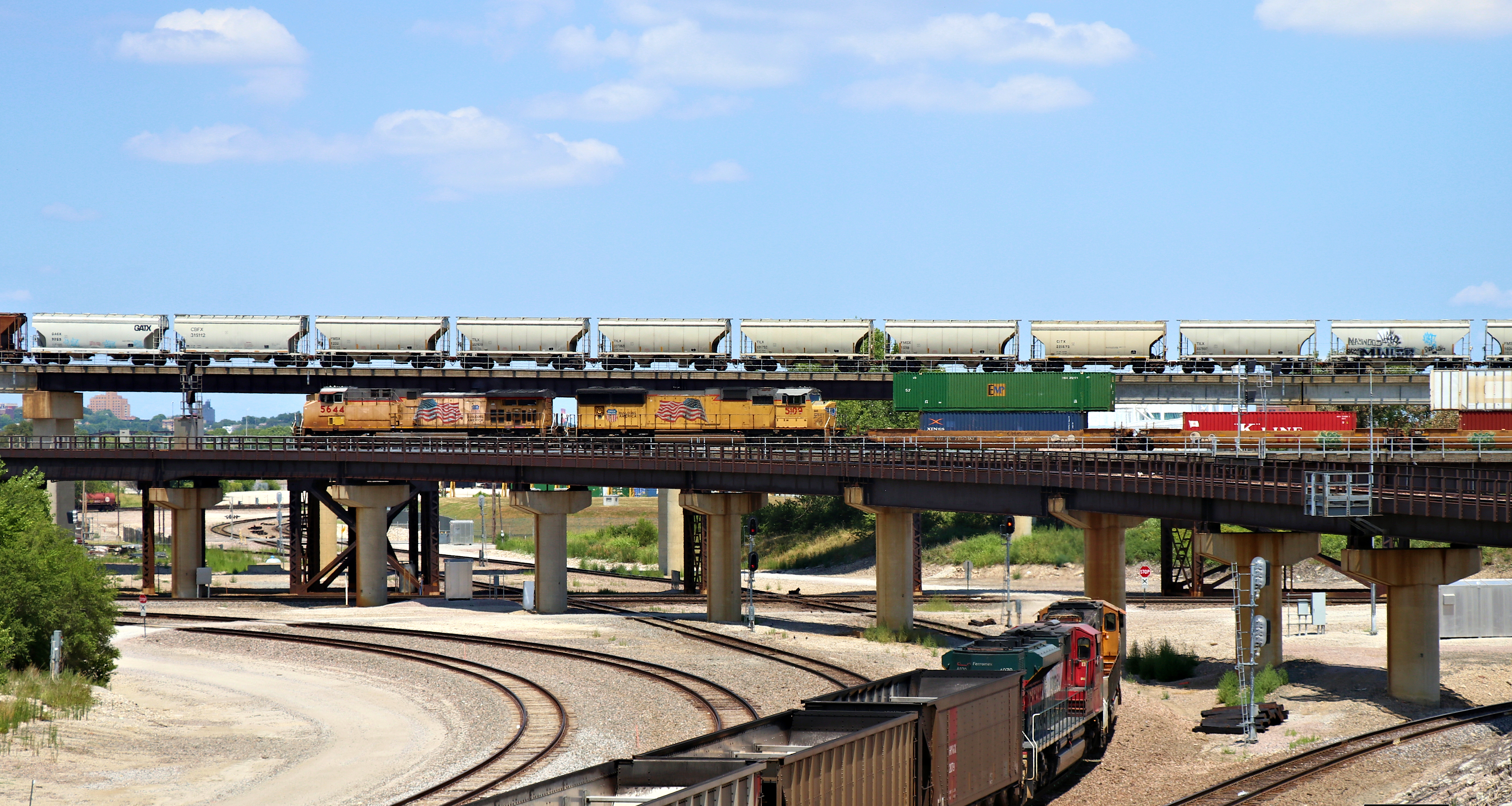
Highline viaduct and Argentine Connection over "Frisco Jct.", north from the W 27th Street Bridge to Nowhere

Crossing the Kansas River in Kansas City, Kansas, United States, the Highline Bridge is rare example of a double-tracked, double-deck railroad bridge designed for carrying railroad traffic on both levels. The bridge is owned and operated by the Kansas City Terminal Railway (KCTR) and provides access between the extensive rail yards on both sides of the river in the Argentine and Armourdale neighborhoods in Kansas City, Kansas, and other rail yards in Kansas City, Missouri.

The current bridge was constructed between 1916 and 1919 as part of the improvements needed to relocate the Kansas City Union Station to its present location while still providing efficient access to railroads serving the station from the west and northwest. The upper deck is a critical link in the elevated Kansas City Highline viaduct originally constructed to carry passenger trains over several busy freight junctions west of the Union Station. The railroads using the bridge for passenger service at the time of construction included the Union Pacific; Chicago Great Western; Missouri Pacific; and Rock Island. Mainlines and junctions then crossed by the Highline included Atchison, Topeka and Santa Fe; Kansas City Terminal; Chicago, Burlington and Quincy; The Katy; Kansas City Southern; and Frisco.

Currently, the bridge handles freight traffic on both levels.

== Construction and physical structure ==
Construction of the bridge and several miles of associated viaducts largely on the northwest side of river cost $3M and was part of $4.5M (approximately $100M adjusted for inflation to 2022) in total improvements needed for the terminal relocation project. The construction of the Highline Bridge was delayed several years beyond the 1914 opening of the new union station due to disagreement on route of the viaducts and location of stations serving Kansas City, Kansas.

The current bridge replaced a 730-foot single-track bridge built in 1907 that consisted of two 300-foot Petit truss spans and a 130-foot approach on the west side. The piers of the old bridge had been constructed to accommodate double track and were reused. Since the old bridge carried approximately 180 train movements per day across the river it could not be removed from operation to accommodate construction. Due to the new bridge's greater height and width, it was constructed around the old bridge while it remained in service, although the existing tracks were centered and elevated so the new bridge floor could be constructed under it.

The current bridge consists of two reinforced Baltimore truss sections built on the original masonry (each weigh 2,300 tons), extended to accommodate the double-deck height, while the west approach was rebuilt as a 132-foot Warren truss such that the bridge is a through structure for the lower deck and a deck structure for the top deck.

All three truss sections that cross the river between the levees have lift jacks to raise the bridge above a high flood.

Construction work was under the direction of J. V. Hanna, chief engineer, and G. E. Tebbetts, bridge engineer of the Kansas City Terminal. The general contractor for the entire project was the Arkansas Bridge Company of Kansas City, MO. The steel work was fabricated by the American Bridge Company at the Gary, IN plant, and was erected by the Kelly Atkinson Construction Company, Chicago, IL.

== Santa Fe Junction / Chicago Junction ==
At ground level, below the Highline, is a complex network of tracks that the KTCR refers to as the "low line". The immediate low line approach to the southeast end of the bridge is a full grand union, with a three-quarter union immediately to the southeast and, originally, a butterfly union immediately to the northeast.

Santa Fe Junction (previously A.T.&S.F. Junction) has been a name for the general location of the main grand union. The name is derived from the original KTCR name for the southwest junction of the main union; and that name appears on the Tower No. 3 (interlocking control tower) at that location. That junction was the KCTR's original connection to Santa Fe's property a short distance from the ATSF Argentine classification yard. The location is also, if less commonly, referred to as Chicago Junction from the KCTR name for the opposing northeast junction. Originally, the Chicago Junction was the KCTR's connection to the nearby Chicago, Burlington and Quincy yard. That yard and butterfly union were later removed, but the name was retained.

== Location and modern operation ==
Currently nearly all the trackage to the northwest of the bridge is under control of the Union Pacific, although the KCTR also owns and operates trackage and a yard as well. The bridge provides a connection for UP traffic on the KCTR to reach the extensive UP Armourdale classification yard, as well as connections to UP lines to the west (Kansas Subdivision) and northwest (Falls City Subdivision). On the east end, the upper level of the bridge continues to near the Kansas City Union station, while the lower level has connections with additional KCTR trackage and BNSF lines at Santa Fe Junction. This allows access to the BNSF Argentine classification yard as well as the Fort Scott and Emporia Subdivisions to the south and west respectively.

In 2004, the KCTR Argentine Connection flyover was completed to carry BNSF Southern Transcon traffic via a third level.
