= Rivanna Subdivision Trestle =

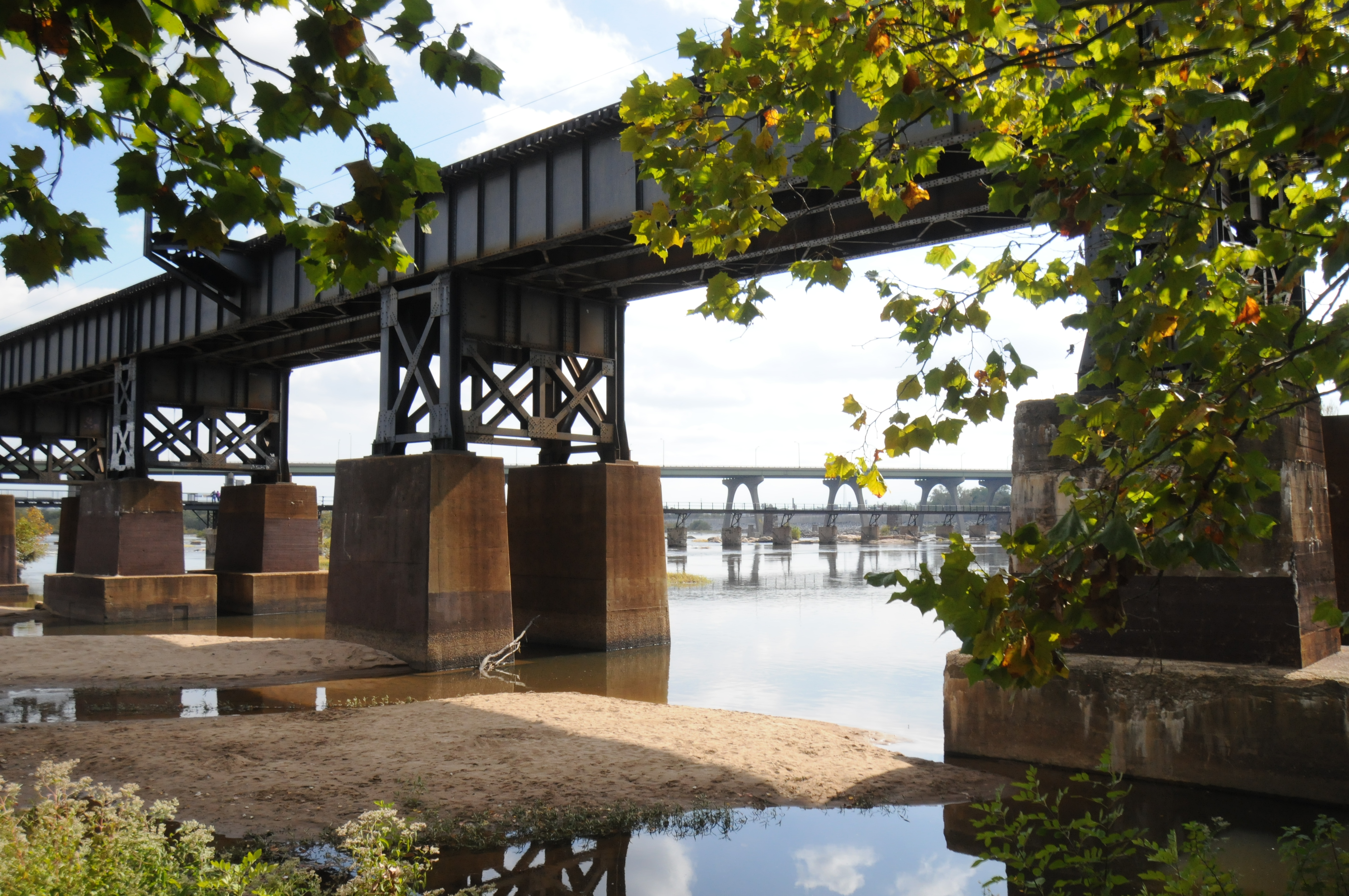
- Coordinates: 37.533229°N 77.43928°W
- Carries: Rivanna Subdivision
- Crosses: United States Route 360, Triple Crossing
- Locale: Richmond, Virginia
- Maintained by: CSX Transportation

Location
- Interactive map of Rivanna Subdivision Trestle

The Rivanna Subdivision Trestle is a trestle in Richmond, Virginia at the end of the Rivanna Subdivision. The bridge is the upper level of Triple Crossing, and also crosses United States Route 360. It parallels the James River, and crosses over Brown's Island. The bridge connects to the Peninsula Subdivision Trestle.
