= Norfolk Southern James River Bridge =

Coordinates: 37°31′53″N 77°25′54″W

- Carries: Richmond District (Norfolk Southern)
- Crosses: James River
- Locale: Richmond, Virginia

Characteristics
- Design: Plate girder/truss

Location
- Interactive map of Norfolk Southern James River Bridge

The Norfolk Southern James River Bridge is a bridge that carries Norfolk Southern Railway traffic over the James River in downtown Richmond, Virginia. The bridge was built by the Southern Railway. The bridge is over 2,000 feet long, and also spans over the western edge of Mayo Island.

The bridge originally connected the Richmond and Danville Railroad to the Richmond and York River Railroad both of which became part of the Southern Railway System. The southern end of the bridge runs beneath what is today the Manchester Floodwall Walk Observation Area. On the north shore it leads to the lowest section of the Triple Crossing. This bridge will be part of the new SEHSR high-speed rail line as trains will stop at Richmond Main Street Station.
