= Kansas City Terminal Railway =

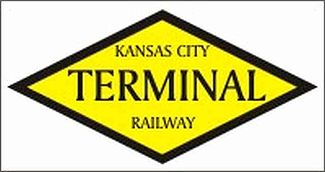

Overview
- Headquarters: Kansas City, Missouri
- Reporting mark: KCT
- Locale: Kansas, Missouri
- Dates of operation: 1906–present

Technical
- Track gauge: 4 ft 8 1/2 in (1,435 mm) standard gauge

Other
- Website: kctrailway.com

The Kansas City Terminal Railway (reporting mark KCT) is a Class III terminal railroad that serves as a joint operation of the trunk railroads that serve the Kansas City metropolitan area, the United States' second largest rail hub after Chicago. It is operated by the Kaw River Railroad.

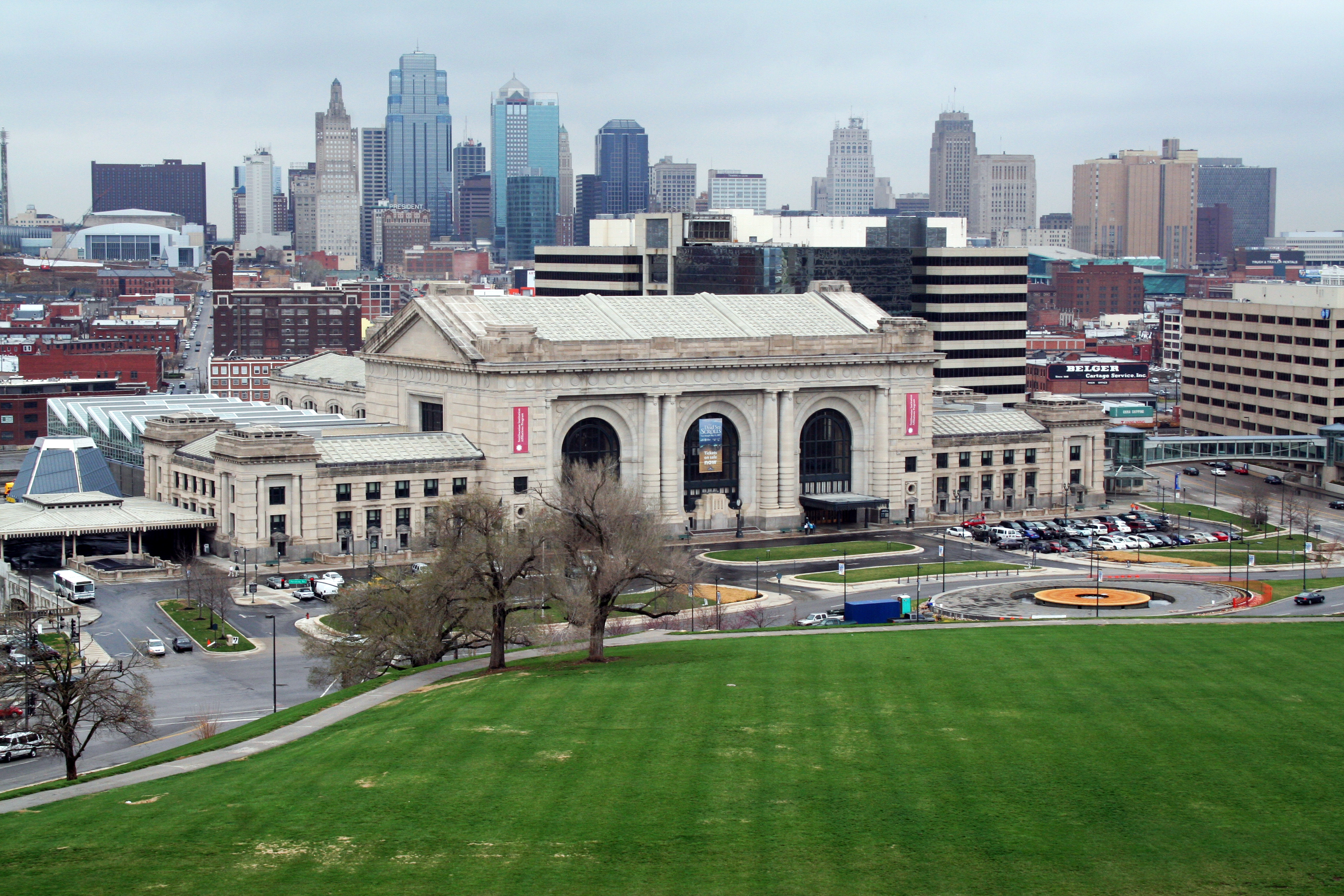
Kansas City Union Station

The railway owns and dispatches 95 miles of track in Kansas and Missouri. It no longer owns Kansas City Union Station. It leases six locomotives and no freight cars. Maintenance operations are subcontracted to BNSF Railway.

KCT now serves the Class I railroads BNSF, Canadian Pacific Kansas City, Norfolk Southern, and Union Pacific. It also serves Amtrak, as well as the Class II railroad Missouri & Northern Arkansas Railroad and the class III railroad Kaw River Railroad (a WATCO subsidiary).

== History ==
The railway was created after a series of floods—including a large one in 1903—inundated the West Bottoms each time and temporarily closed the Union Depot there. The 12 original trunk railways of the city at the time joined to build the new Union Station and to coordinate the bridges and switches that serve the city.

The original trunk railroads that were owners of the Kansas City Terminal were:

- Alton Railroad
- Atchison, Topeka & Santa Fe Railway
- Chicago, Burlington & Quincy Railroad
- Chicago Great Western Railway
- Chicago, Milwaukee, St. Paul & Pacific Railroad
- Chicago, Rock Island & Pacific Railroad
- Kansas City Southern Railway
- Missouri-Kansas-Texas Railroad
- Missouri Pacific Railroad
- St. Louis-San Francisco Railway
- Union Pacific Railroad
- Wabash Railroad

Under an Interstate Commerce Commission order, the railway operated and then oversaw the liquidation of the Rock Island Line from 1979 to 1980.

== See also ==
- Highline Bridge (Kansas City, Kansas) – Double-deck railroad bridge in Kansas City
