= Triple Crossing =

Railroad crossing in Richmond, Virginia, U.S.

Coordinates: 37.532012°N 77.431641°W

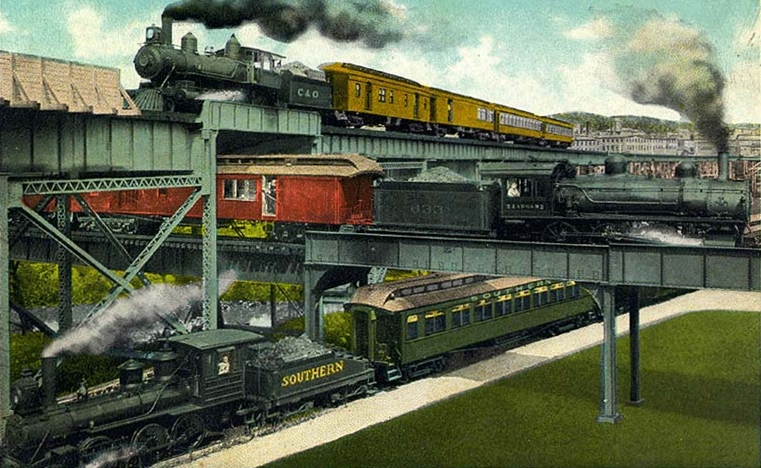
Triple Crossing in 1919

The Triple Crossing in Richmond, Virginia, is one of two places in North America where three railroad lines cross at different levels at the same spot, the other being the BNSF operated Santa Fe Junction in Kansas City. Santa Fe Junction became a triple crossing after the Argentine Connection was completed in 2004.

At the lowest (ground) level, Norfolk Southern Railway operates a line to West Point, Virginia on its Richmond District line. The line was first built by the Richmond and Danville Railroad between 1886 and 1895 and split off from its main line on the north side of the railroad's James River bridge and ran to the eastern end of the peninsula created by the Kanawha Canal. This line was paralleled by an older trestle built by the Richmond and Alleghany Railroad in the early 1880s. The trestle and tracks ran from the R&A yards at Eighth and Canal Streets, along Byrd Street, and ended at the terminus of the peninsula. Between 1895 and 1905, the R&D extended its line across the canal to join with the old Richmond and York River Railroad at a point just to the west of Pear and Dock Streets. The bridge which carried the line across the canal was replaced in 1930 by one built by the Virginia Bridge and Iron Company. After the Civil War, the R&D had built a connection railroad to the R&YR along Dock Street and primarily used this line to route its West Point traffic. However, the Dock Street line was abandoned in the late 1980s, upon which all traffic was routed to the line lying on the south of the canal.

The middle level was formerly the main line of the Seaboard Air Line Railroad and is now part of CSX Transportation's "S" line. The 18-foot-high (5.5 m) trestle was built between 1897 and 1900 as part of the Richmond, Petersburg and Carolina Railroad, which was bought by the SAL in 1898. About 1,000 feet (300 m) north of the Triple Crossing lies Main Street Station, which was jointly operated by the SAL and the Chesapeake and Ohio Railway. This line is planned to become part of the Southeast High Speed Rail Corridor.

At the top level is the 36-foot-high (11 m) Peninsula Subdivision Trestle, a 3-mile-long (5 km) viaduct parallel to the north bank of the James River built by the Chesapeake and Ohio in 1901 to link the former Richmond and Alleghany Railroad with the C&O's Peninsula Subdivision to Newport News and export coal piers. The viaduct, now owned by CSX Transportation, provided an alternate path to the notoriously unstable Church Hill Tunnel which was used from 1873 to 1925 and buried a work train with fatalities on October 2, 1925. A locomotive and ten flat cars remain entombed with at least one rail worker, killing several others whose bodies were eventually recovered.

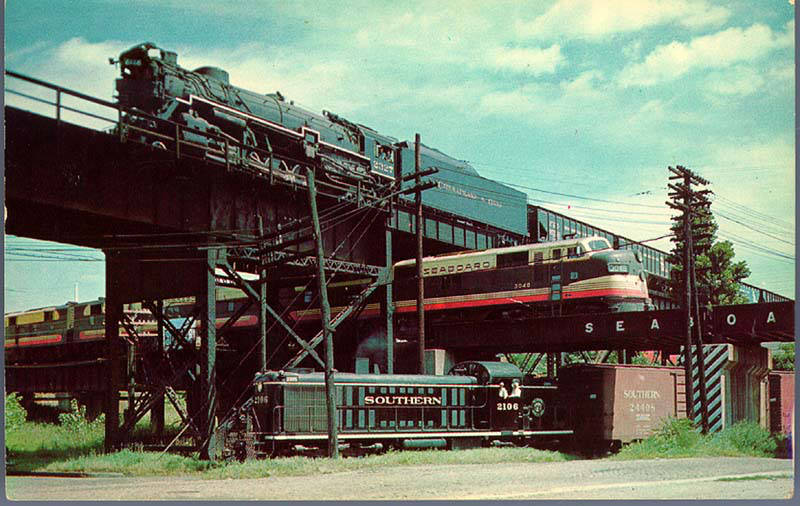
A photograph staged by the three railroads in 1950

The triple crossing has been a Richmond attraction for railfans for over 100 years, although the number of photographic angles decreased in the 1990s due to a new flood wall. The three railroads intersecting at Triple Crossing staged photos with trains on all three levels on several occasions.

== See also ==
- List of bridges documented by the Historic American Engineering Record in Virginia
