= Kansas Avenue Bridge (West) =

- Coordinates: 39.0874°N 94.6593°W
- Carries: 4 lanes of K-32 (Kansas Avenue)
- Crosses: Kansas River
- Locale: Kansas City, Kansas
- Maintained by: KDOT

Characteristics
- Design: Thru-Truss (first bridge); Multi-beam girder (second and current bridge)

History
- Opened: 1916 (first bridge); 1988 (second and current bridge)

Location
- Interactive map of Kansas Avenue Bridge (West)

The Kansas Avenue Bridge (West) is a four lane, multi-beam girder bridge crossing the Kansas River, and a small company on the east side. It was first built in 1916 as a 9 span thru-truss, but later in 1988 destroyed, and replaced with the current multi-beam girder bridge. It is just west of the 18th Street Expressway Bridge.
