= Trestle bridge =

Bridge of short spans supported by rigid frames

Trestle
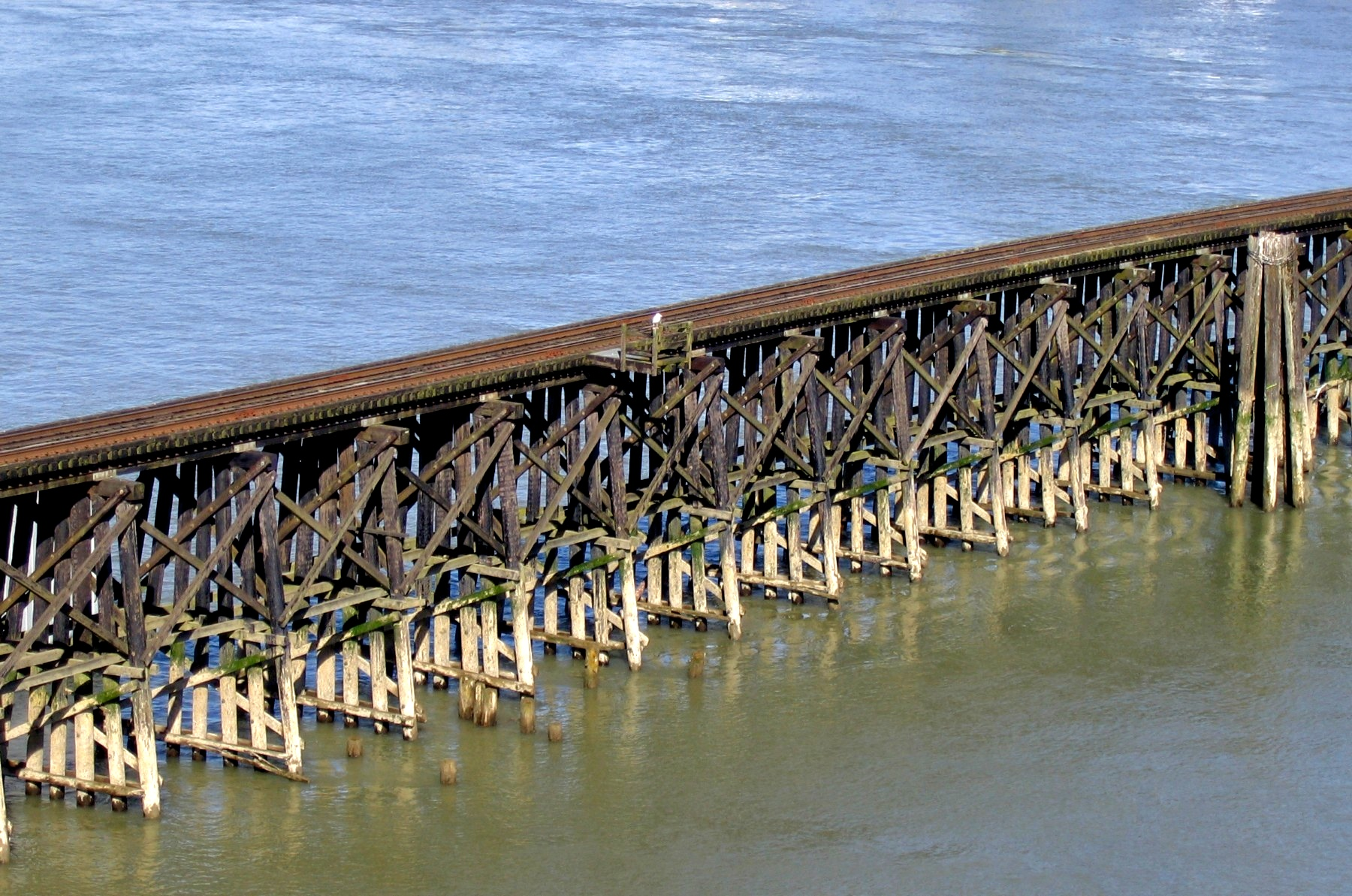
- Trestles are useful as approaches to bridges over marshes and shallows.
- Span range: Short
- Material: Timber, iron, steel, reinforced concrete, prestressed concrete
- Movable: No
- Design effort: Low
- Falsework required: No

A trestle bridge is a bridge composed of a number of short spans supported by closely spaced frames usually carrying a railroad line. A trestle (sometimes tressel) is a rigid frame used as a support, historically a tripod used to support a stool or a pair of isosceles triangles joined at their apices by a plank or beam such as the support structure for a trestle table. Each supporting frame is a bent. A trestle differs from a viaduct in that viaducts have towers that support much longer spans and typically have a higher elevation.

Timber and iron trestles (i.e. bridges) were extensively used in the 19th century, the former making up from 1 to 3 percent of the total length of the average railroad. In the 21st century, steel and sometimes concrete trestles are commonly used to bridge particularly deep valleys, while timber trestles remain common in certain areas.

Many timber trestles were built in the 19th and early 20th centuries with the expectation that they would be temporary. Timber trestles were used to get the railroad to its destination. Once the railroad was running, it was used to transport the material to replace trestles with more permanent works, transporting and dumping fill around some trestles and transporting stone or steel to replace others with more permanent bridges.

In the later 20th century, tools such as the earthmover made it cheaper to construct a high fill directly instead of first constructing a trestle from which to dump the fill. Timber trestles remain common in some applications, most notably for bridge approaches crossing floodways, where earth fill would dangerously obstruct floodwater.

For the purposes of discharging material below, a coal trestle carried a dead-end track, rather than a bridge.

== Timber trestles ==
One of the longest trestle spans created was for railroad traffic crossing the Great Salt Lake on the Lucin Cutoff in Utah. It was replaced by a fill causeway in the 1960s, and is now being salvaged for its timber.

Many wooden roller coasters are built using designs similar to trestle bridges because such a structure can be strong and support a high track path while using a relatively small amount of material. Since loads are well distributed through large portions of the structure it is also resilient to the stresses imposed. The structure also naturally leads to a certain redundancy (provided that economic considerations are not overly dominant). Such wooden coasters, while limited in their path (not supporting loops), possess a certain ride character (owing to structural response) that is appreciated by fans of the type.

The Camas Prairie Railroad in northern Idaho utilized many timber trestles across the rolling Camas Prairie and in the major grade, Lapwai Canyon. The 450-metre (1,490 ft) viaduct across Lawyers Canyon was the exception, constructed of steel and 87 metres (287 ft) in height.

The floodway of the Bonnet Carré Spillway in St. Charles Parish, Louisiana, is crossed by three wooden trestles each over 2.4 kilometres (1.5 mi) in length. The trestles are owned by the Canadian National Railway (two trestles) and the Kansas City Southern Railroad. The trestles were completed in 1936, after construction of the Spillway. The trestles may be the longest wooden railroad trestles remaining in regular use in North America.

A coal trestle is a rigid-frame trestle supporting train tracks above chutes, used to deliver fuel to boats or trains beneath it. At the top of the trestle, rolling stock (typically hopper cars) open doors on their undersides or on their sides to discharge cargo. Coal trestles were also used to transfer coal from mining railroads to rail cars. They were prominent when coal was an important fuel for rail locomotion and steamships, before they were replaced with mechanical coal loaders during the 20th century. Coal trestles were used in the Great Lakes ports of Buffalo (on Lake Erie), Sodus Point and Oswego, New York (both on Lake Ontario).

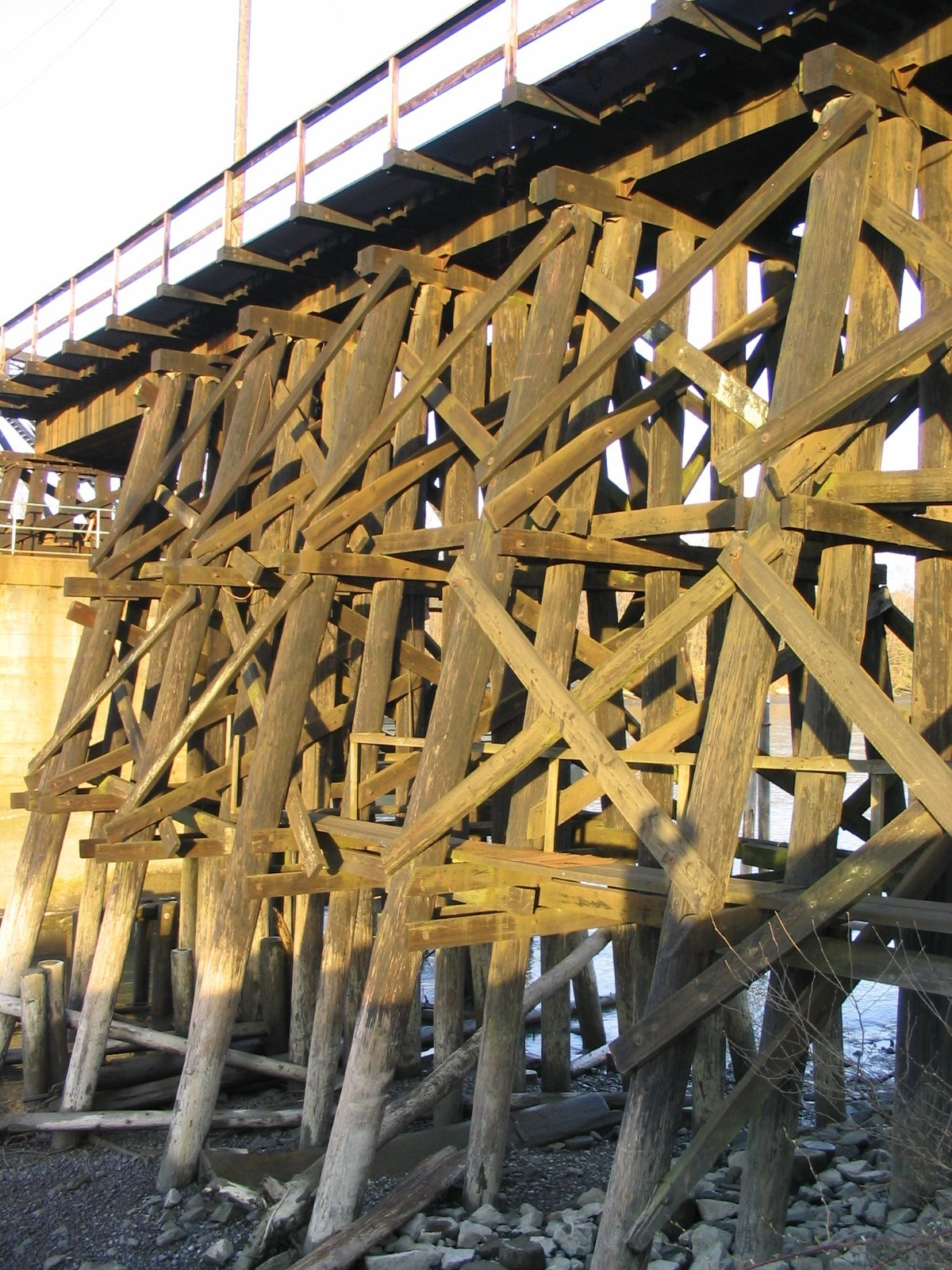
Trestle of wooden posts, beams, and diagonal braces

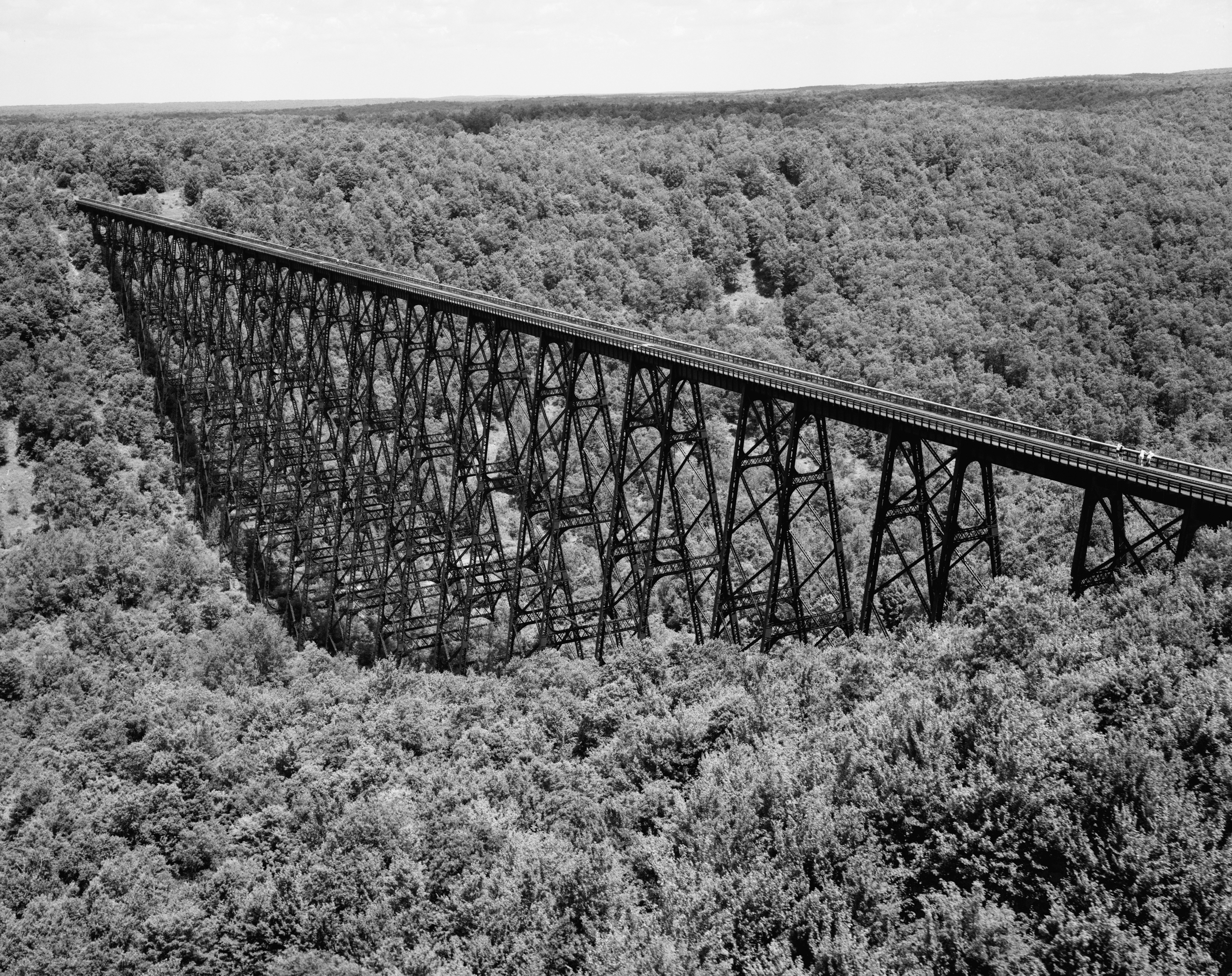
Kinzua viaduct over the Kinzua Creek valley in Pennsylvania

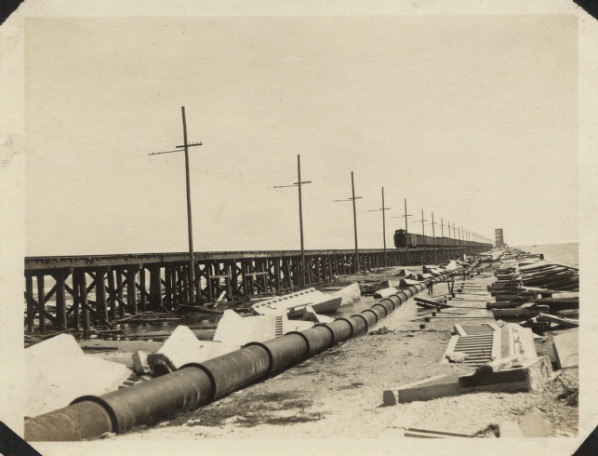
Interurban train trestle, completed after the 1915 Galveston Hurricane

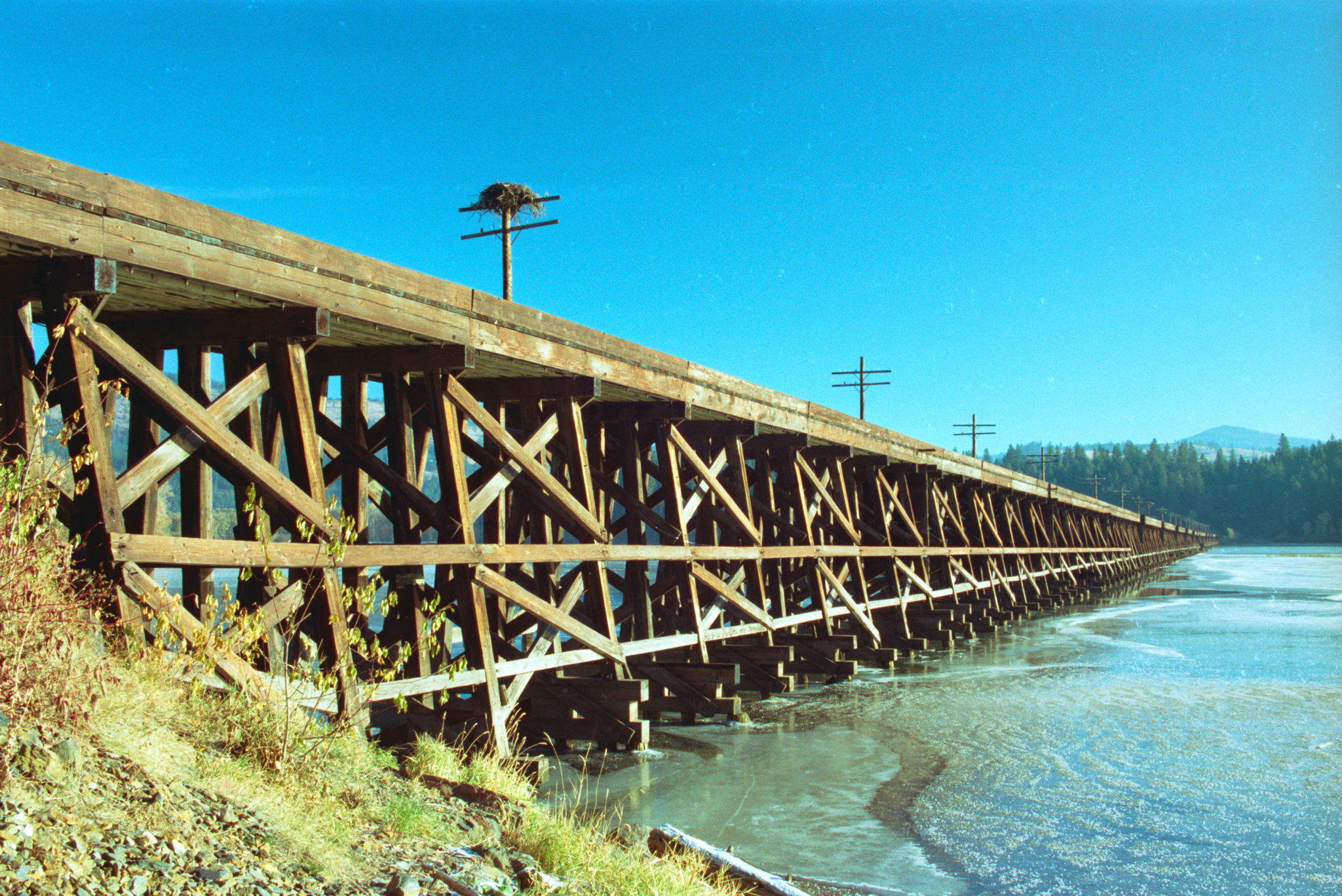
Lake Benewah, Idaho trestle bridge

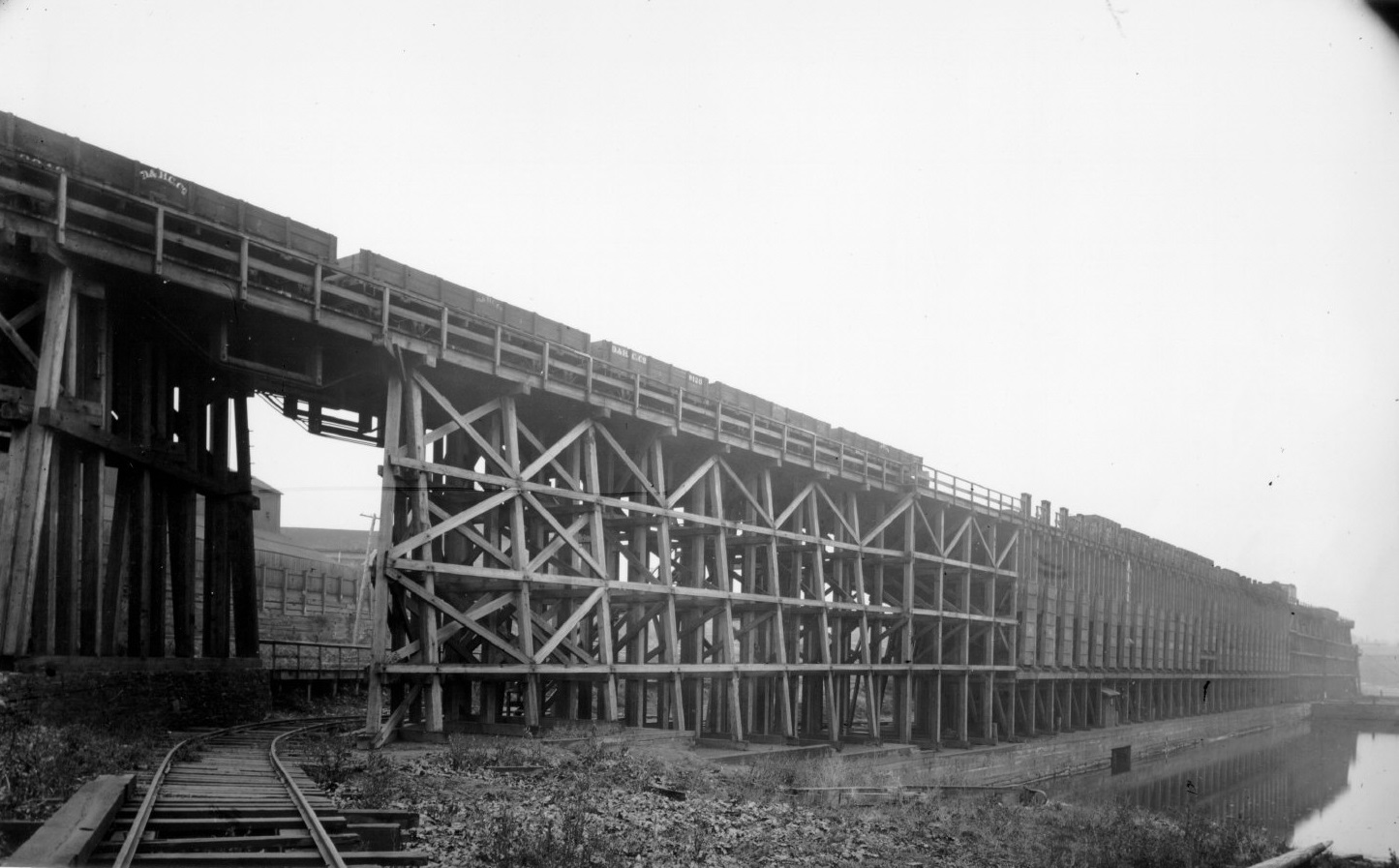
Coal trestle at the Port of Oswego on Lake Ontario, New York (pre-1935)

=== In the United Kingdom ===
In the United Kingdom, timber trestles were relatively short-lived as a structural type, one of their major uses being to cross the many deep valleys in Cornwall on the spinal rail route through the county. These were all replaced by masonry viaducts. Few timber trestles survived into the 20th century. Two that did, and which are still in daily use, cross the Afon Mawddach on the coast of Wales only a few miles apart, at Barmouth and Penmaenpool. The former, built in 1867, carries trains on the heavy rail Cambrian Coast Line travelling from England via Shrewsbury to the various small towns on Cardigan Bay. It also carries a toll-path for pedestrians. Road traffic at this location has to travel many miles around the estuary to cross at either (for light traffic) the second trestle bridge, at Penmaenpool, which is a toll bridge; or (for heavy traffic) at Dolgellau even further up the estuary.

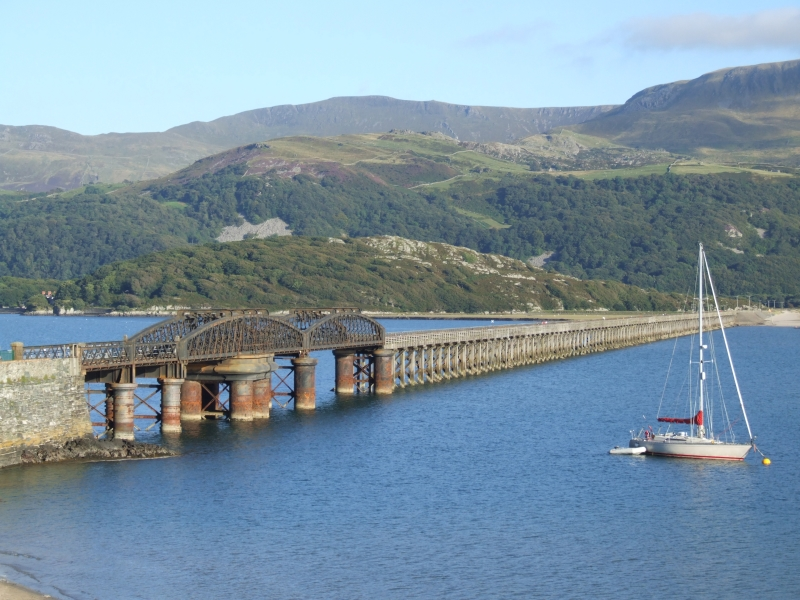
Barmouth railway viaduct, showing two steel spans providing access for marine traffic

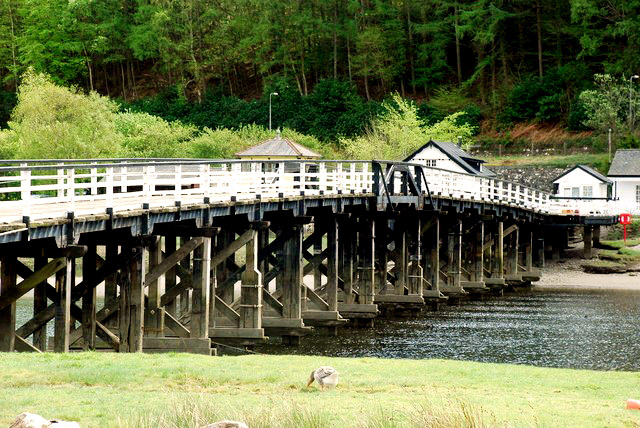
Penmaenpool toll bridge over the Afon Mawddach

== Iron trestles ==
Trestles in cast- or wrought-iron were used during the 19th century on the developing railway network in the United Kingdom. These generally carried decking consisting of some form of trussed girder, as at Crumlin Viaduct, Belah and Meldon; though two rare examples, at Dowery Dell (demolished in 1962), and Bennerley had lattice girder decks.

== Steel trestles ==
The steel trestle at Martinez, California, shown below, is a modern structure with a long expected lifetime compared to a wooden trestle. Being less susceptible to fire damage in this brushy location is also an advantage. The approaches to the Kate Shelley High Bridge near Boone, Iowa, are steel trestles.

New Orleans utilizes steel trestles to support parts of I-10, the Pontchartrain Expressway, and Tulane Avenue. Also, trestles support the elevated railroad leading to and from the Huey P. Long Bridge.

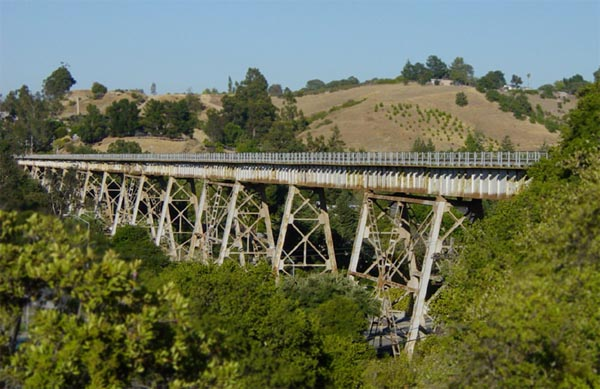
View of the Muir Trestle, a.k.a. Alhambra Trestle, a steel trestle with plate girder spans and double-bent steel towers

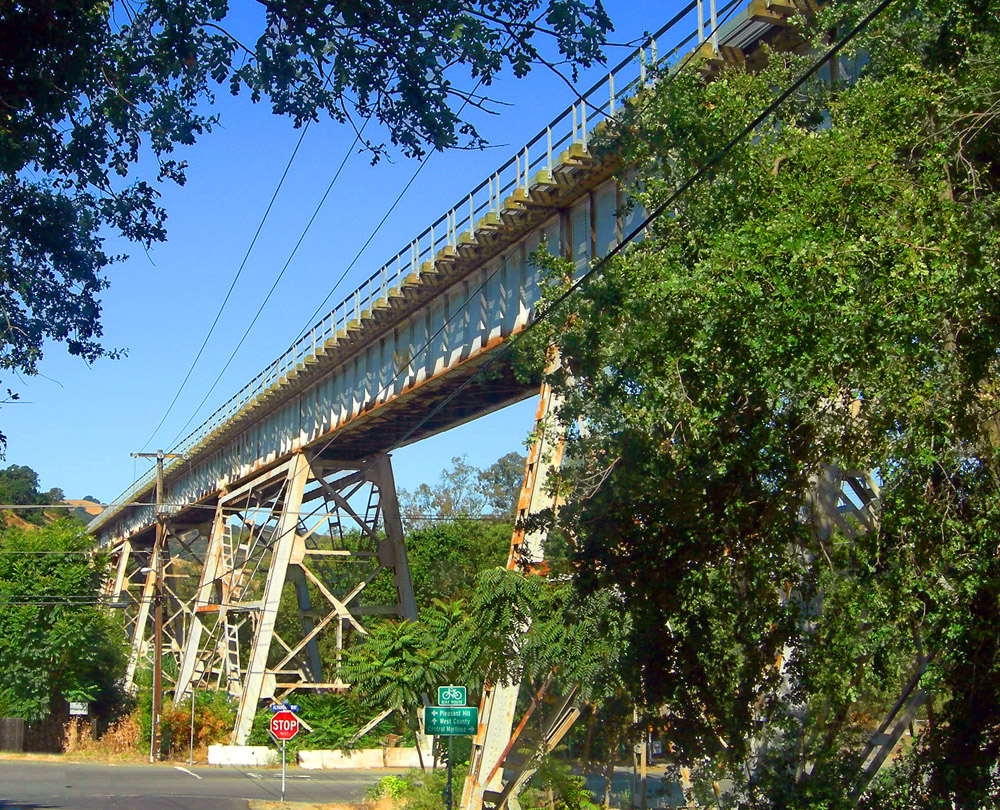
Alternate view of the Muir Trestle

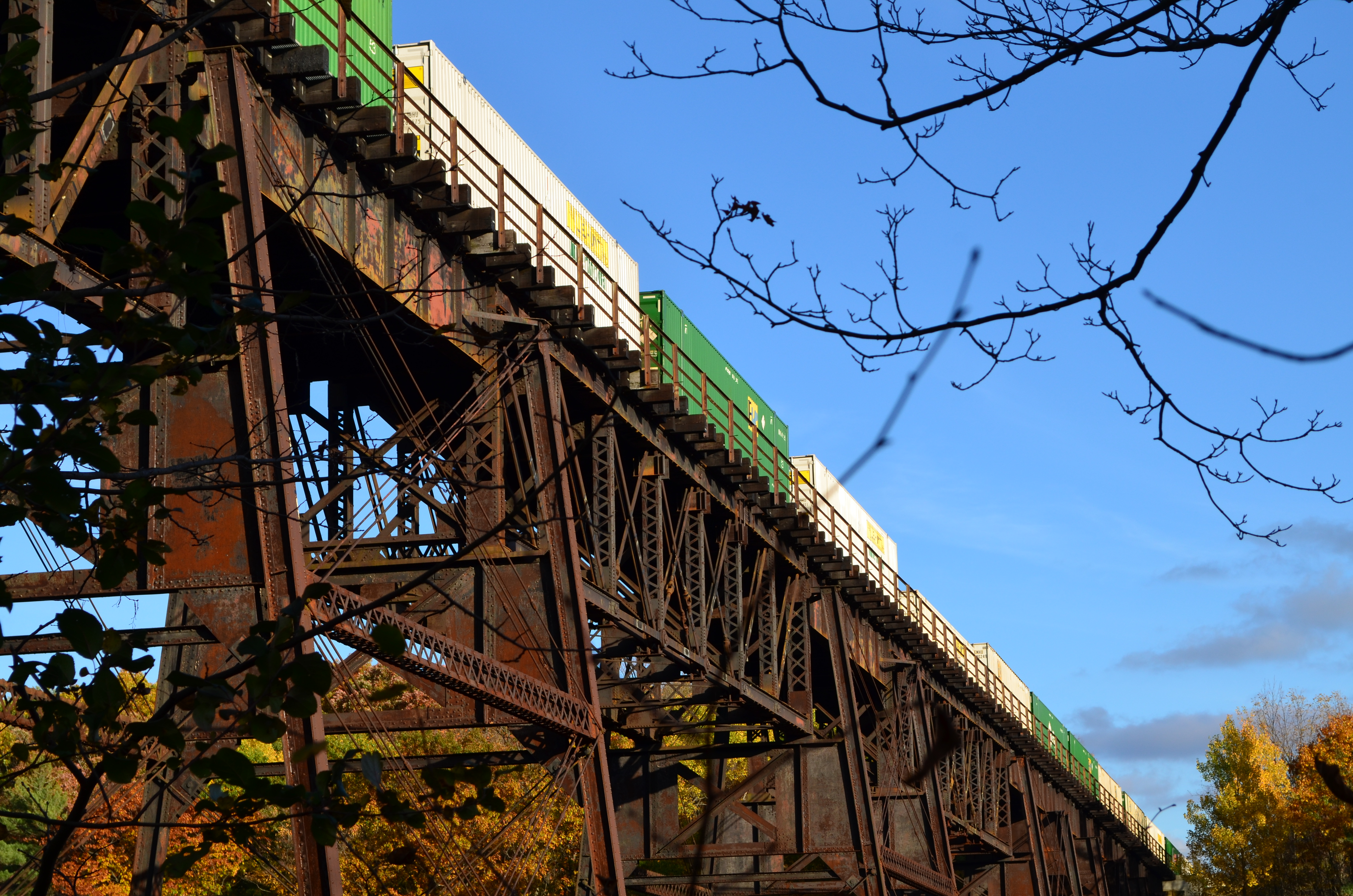
A steel trestle over the Genesee River in Letchworth State Park, New York

== Concrete trestles ==
The first major prestressed concrete trestle railroad bridge built was the Atlantic Coast Line's Salkehatchie River trestle.

== See also ==
- List of trestle bridges
- Bridge
