= 23rd Street viaduct =

Bridge in Kansas City, Kansas, U.S.

- Coordinates: 39°05′24″N 94°36′31″W
- Carries: 4 lanes of Kansas Avenue in Kansas, 4 lanes of 23rd Street in Missouri
- Crosses: Kansas River, West Bottoms, parking lot to Kemper Arena
- Locale: Kansas City, Kansas, to Kansas City, Missouri
- Official name: Kansas Avenue Bridge
- Maintained by: Wyandotte County, Kansas, Unified Government
- ID number: 414301052600057

Characteristics
- Design: Warren deck truss

History
- Opened: 1921
- Closed: 2022

Location
- Interactive map of 23rd Street viaduct

The 23rd Street viaduct, known as the (East) Kansas Avenue Bridge in Kansas, is an automobile crossing of the Kansas River, south of the Rock Island Bridge. Though it is entirely in Kansas City, Kansas, one half leads to Kansas City, Missouri, where Kansas Avenue becomes Avenida César E. Chávez, known as 23rd Street until 1994. The span is 1,395 feet (425 m) long.

It has two side approaches, one to the south, one to the north, and rises above the south part of the West Bottoms and the parking lot to Hy-Vee Arena.

== Description ==
The Kansas Avenue Bridge has three main and seventeen approach spans. The main spans over the Kansas (Kaw) River are a Warren deck truss, with the trusses cantilevering at either end.

== History ==
=== Construction ===
A previous low-line bridge over the river existed at the site, and plans for a high-line replacement were drafted in 1914. However, various delays on the Kansas and Missouri side stalled construction. Work on the piers took place in 1915, but construction was briefly halted in June when county commissioners believed that concrete bases were not being drilled enough to support its weight. By November, the main issue was that work on the Missouri side's new 23rd Street Trafficway had not sufficiently advanced.

Despite the Kansas River washing out some bridge falsework, construction of the bridge itself was almost finished in May 1916. The dilemma facing Kansas officials was outlined by a headline in The Weekly Gazette Globe: "Wyandotte County Completes Kansas Avenue High Line Before Missouri Gets Started". In 1915, Missouri was reported to have no funding to build its approach, resulting in a decision to build a temporary connection to another viaduct carrying Allen Avenue. The incomplete link snarled traffic in the area; vehicles crossing from the Armourdale area on the Kansas side faced long waits, and freight vehicles were being detoured as many as five miles (8 km) to the James Street Bridge. Even though a dispute about the use of the new bridge by streetcars was settled in August and work on the Missouri approaches started later that year, the agreement came apart. The Metropolitan Railway was prevented from laying tracks on the road by the Kansas City, Kansas, police until it agreed to pay its share of the viaduct's cost under Kansas law. A final settlement was reached on February 3, 1917, under which the railway capitulated to the county officials' demands, allowing the streetcars to discontinue using the old bridge. Dismantling of the old bridge, considered a "flood menace" by the Kaw Valley Drainage Board, began days later.

The temporary Missouri-side approach, a wooden structure, was inadequate. In 1918, it was labeled "dangerous to public welfare", but resources and labor were unavailable to build it because they had been diverted to fight World War I; the war had previously affected bridge construction by raising prices for materials. The viaduct east of the Kansas River did not open until September 1, 1921.

=== Later years ===
The rails used by the streetcars were removed after the Great Flood of 1951. The bridge was closed in 1954 to allow it to be widened to four lanes, raised five feet (1.5 m), and resurfaced. The reopened bridge relieved a congested 7th Street Trafficway Bridge. Another lengthy closure took place from December 1960 to September 1961.

In 1974, a portion of the concrete deck fell into the Kansas River; major repairs were suggested to be put off because of impending major work. This work took place between November 1977 and November 1978 and involved a re-decking of the structure. Jurisdiction was transferred from Wyandotte County to Kansas City, Kansas, at the end of the project. Another major refit of the bridge occurred between May 2007 and January 2008; a ramp to Wyoming Street was removed.

After an inspection, in July 2022, the Unified Government of Wyandotte County and Kansas City, Kansas, closed the bridge to traffic. This came a year after Unified Government performed emergency repairs, including the replacement of a joint, after a consultant for the Kansas Department of Transportation notified it about "concerning signs of wear". In March 2023, Unified Government officials committed $30 million in order to qualify for matching grants to repair the bridge. As of February 2026, the bridge remains closed as the Unified Government attempts to obtain funding for design and environmental clearance.
