= 18th Street Expressway Bridge =

- Coordinates: 39°4′38″N 94°38′59″W
- Carried: 4 lanes of US-69 (18th Street Expressway)
- Crossed: Kansas River, BNSF Railway
- Locale: Kansas City, Kansas
- Maintained by: KDOT

Characteristics
- Design: Deck Truss

History
- Opened: 1959
- Demolished: 2026

Location
- Interactive map of 18th Street Expressway Bridge

The 18th Street Expressway Bridge was a one level deck truss, four lane crossing of the Kansas River in Kansas City, Kansas. It was built in 1959, to replace the Argentine Bridge to the west. It carried the 18th Street Expressway, signed as U.S. 69.

It also crossed the BNSF railroad tracks.

It was damaged in 2000, after a BNSF train derailed and destroyed one of the piers, which caused the south approach span to buckle, and disabled it for several months while it was being repaired.

The bridge had no significant shoulder (breakdown lane) and no pedestrian walkway.

The bridge was closed for about 7 months in 2018 for repair. A 2019 study found more repairs would be needed, and the bridge closed in March 2025 to prepare for demolition and eventual replacement by a new bridge to be constructed by KDOT. On February 16, the main span was demolished using a controlled dynamite blast. Construction of the replacement bridge is estimated to last 24 months. During construction, traffic will be detoured via the 7th Street Trafficway Bridge
