= Peninsula Subdivision Trestle =

Railroad trestle in Richmond, Virginia

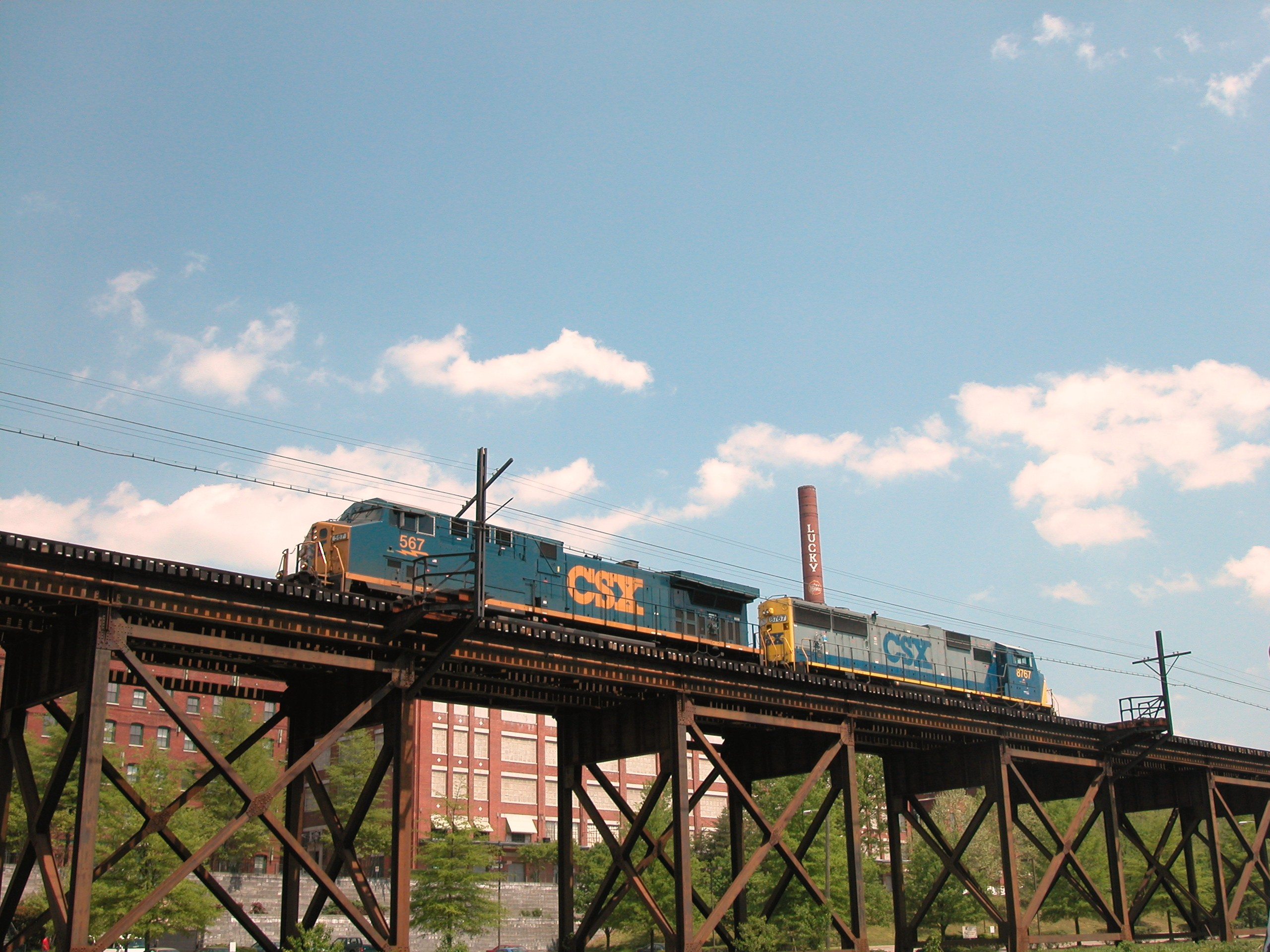
- Coordinates: 37.531233°N 77.427027°W
- Carries: Peninsula Subdivision
- Crosses: U.S. Route 250/State Route 33, U.S. Route 60/U.S. Route 360, Norfolk Southern Railway, several minor roads
- Locale: Richmond, Virginia
- Maintained by: CSX Transportation

Characteristics
- Total length: >2 miles (3.2 km)

Location
- Interactive map of Peninsula Subdivision Trestle

The Peninsula Subdivision Trestle is a railroad trestle in Richmond, Virginia on the Peninsula Subdivision of CSX Transportation.

== Details ==
Starting in the north, the bridge begins to rise and cross East Marshall Street and East Broad Street (U.S. Route 250 and State Route 33). It then passes the Main Street Station. Then it crosses East Main Street (U.S. Routes 60 and 360), East Cary Street, South 17th Street, and Dock Street before connecting to the Rivanna Subdivision Trestle at Rivanna Junction. The bridge parallels the James River and runs between the river and the large buildings of Tobacco Row before it crosses the Norfolk Southern Railway, Dock Street, Pear Street and Main Street again before finally returning to ground level.
