= 7th Street Trafficway Bridge =

- Coordinates: 39.0752°N 94.6247°W
- Carries: 4 lanes of US-169 (7th Street Trafficway)
- Crosses: Kansas River, BNSF Railway
- Locale: Kansas City, Kansas
- Official name: Herman G. Dillon Bridge
- Maintained by: KDOT

Characteristics
- Design: Deck Truss (northbound bridge), Girder (southbound bridge)

History
- Opened: 1932 (deck truss), 1970 (girder)

The 7th Street Trafficway Bridge is a one level deck truss bridge over the Kansas River and BNSF Railway tracks on 7th Street. It was built in 1932. It connects the Armourdale district of Kansas City, Kansas, to the east end of the Argentine district of Kansas City, Kansas. In 1970, the bridge was resurfaced, repainted, and a new sister bridge was built. The new sister bridge is a two lane girder bridge that would now carry southbound lanes, making the deck truss bridge into a northbound bridge only.

It is also called the Herman G. Dillon Bridge, and it survived the 1951 flood.
