= List of buildings at Marshall University =

Marshall University in Huntington, West Virginia, is home to many notable structures, including two residential high-rises.

== Main campus buildings ==
Building	Image	Constructed	Notes	Reference
Arthur Weisberg Family Applied Engineering Complex		2015	Includes the Arthur Weisberg Family Engineering Laboratories which was completed in 2008, are named for a donor family.	
Bliss Charles Public Safety Building		1995	Houses MU Police Department	
Brad D. Smith Center for Business and Innovation		2024	New location for the Lewis College of Business on 4th Ave in Huntington, WV	
Brad D. Smith Foundation Hall		2010	It houses the Erickson Alumni Center on the first floor. It is named for donors Brad D. Smith and Charlie O. Erickson respectively.	
Buskirk Hall		1965	Originally West Hall, it is a female dormitory. It was renamed for a Lillian Helms Buskirk, who was dean of women from 1941 until 1970.	
Cam Henderson Center		1981	Marshall's basketball arena, it also includes the Fitch Natatorium. Arena was named after former basketball coach, Cam Henderson.	
Campus Christian Center		1960/1961	On private land surrounded by the campus and receives no state funding, and serves as a Protestant chapel. Eight Protestant denominations jointly manage the CCC.	
Career Services Center		1930	Formerly a private home, was purchased in 1970.	
Chris Cline Athletic Complex		2014	Indoor practice facility for the football program and houses an indoor track. It is named for the donor, Chris Cline.	
Corbly Hall		1980	Classroom building named for former university president Lawrence J. Corbly.	
Dot Hicks Field		2008	Marshall's softball field, named after a former professor	
Drinko Library		1998	Primary library on campus named for a donor, Dr. John Deaver Drinko.	
Education Building		1937	The building was originally Marshall College High School, and was renamed to Jenkins Laboratory School in 1937. It was named for Albert G. Jenkins. The building became a part of Marshall University in 1970. His name was removed from the building in 2020	
Edwards Performing Arts Center		1992	Expanded with the Jomie Jazz Center in 2000. Named for Joan C. Edwards in 1997,	
Fred and Christine Shewey Athletics Building		1992	Connected to Edwards Stadium, it houses athletic department offices.	
First-Year Residence Halls		2008	Consisting of Freshman North and Freshman South Hall.	
Gillette Welcome Center		2007	Former sorority house, was purchased in 2007 and is used by the admissions and recruitment. It was named for a donor, Joseph M. Gillette.	
Gullickson Hall		1961	Original name was the Physical Education Building. It was renamed Gullickson Hall in 1963 after a physical education teacher, Otto Gullickson.	
Harless Dining Hall		2004	Named for donor Buck Harless.	
Harris Hall		1976	Classroom building named for former professor Arvil Ernest Harris.	
Holderby Hall		1963	Originally South Hall, is a high-rise dormitory completed in 1963 and expanded in 1968. It was named for the original donor of the quarter acre of land in 1837 at the school's founding.	
INTO Marshall University Building		1943-1947	The original dining hall, it was remodeled in 1975 as an office building.	
Jack Cook Field		2024	Marshall's baseball stadium named after former coach, Jack Cook.	
Joan C. Edwards Stadium		1991	Marshall's football stadium named after Joan C. Edwards. The field is named after her husband, James F. Edwards.	
Laidley Hall		1937	Small dormitory, named for the university's founder, John Laidley.	
Marshall Commons		2003	Consists of Gibson Hall, Wellman Hall, Haymaker Hall, and Willis Hall which are upper-division residence halls.	
Memorial Student Center		1971	Named in honor of the 1970 football team.	
Morrow Library		1930	Former main library. With the completion of the Drinko Library, it is an auxiliary library and museum. It was named for former president James E. Morrow.	
Myers Hall		1992	Used by the HELP (Higher Education for Learning Problems) program, a tutoring program for students with learning problems. It was named for a donor, Wilbur E. Myers.	
Newman Center		1981	On private land surrounded by the campus and receive no state funding, and serves as a Catholic chapel.	
Old Main		1868	Original building on campus and the symbol of the university. It was built between 1868 and 1908 and last remodeled in 2000. It currently is an office building.	
One Room School House		ca. 1888	Built on the border of rural Mason and Cabell Counties at Glenwood, West Virginia, around 1889 and moved to the campus in 1995. It is a museum dedicated to the university's origin as a teacher's college.	
Prichard Hall		1955	Originally a dormitory it was remodeled in 1973 into a classroom and office building. It was named for Lucy Prichard, a former professor.	
Health and Wellness Center		2009	It also houses the Wellness Center.	
Robert C. Byrd Biotechnology Science Center		2006	Classroom building named for former United States Senator, Robert Byrd.	
Robert L. Pruett Training Center		2006	Named for former football coach, Bob Pruett, it serves as a weight training center for student-athletes.	
Science Building		1950	Expanded in 1984 and renovated in 1992	
Smith Hall		1967	Consists of Smith Hall, Smith Music Hall, the Communications Building and the Birke Art Gallery. It was named for former university president Stewart H. Smith and is the largest classroom building on campus.	
Sorrell Maintenance Building		1965	Non-academic building used by the Buildings and Grounds division. Named for Howard Kenneth Sorrell in 1978.	
Twin Towers		1969	Consisting of Towers East and Towers West it is the largest dormitory on campus.	

== Medical and Forensic Science Facilities ==
The Medical Campus consists of several buildings in or near the Fairfield neighborhood of Huntington, in Huntington's east end neighborhood; and at the VA Medical Facility.

Building	Image	Constructed	Notes	Reference
Coon Education Building		1976	Located seven miles from the main campus at 1542 Spring Valley Drive in the unincorporated suburb of Spring Valley, on the grounds of the United States Department of Veterans Affairs Hospital at Huntington. At one time it housed the complete School of Medicine. Today it continues to house the anatomy labs and research facilities. Named after former School of Medicine dean, Robert W. Coon.	
Erma Byrd Clinics		2007	Located at the former Fairfield Stadium site housing major new medical student teaching facilities and clinical education patient care clinics. Named after wife of United States Senator, Robert Byrd.	
Forensic Science Center		2004	Located in the remodeled 1971 football locker room complex from the otherwise demolished Fairfield Stadium.	
Linda S. Holmes Student Wellness Center		2019	Located at 1321 Hal Greer Boulevard, it also houses the medical school’s student affairs and financial aid offices. Named after Linda Holmes, a former player and coach at Marshall.	
Medical Center		1998	Located at 1600 Medical Center Drive on the campus of Cabell Huntington Hospital is part of the Health Sciences Campus as well as the School of Medicine.	
School of Pharmacy		2019	Housed in Kopp Hall, which is located at the corner of Charleston Avenue and Hal Greer Blvd. It also contains a housing unit for married students. Named after former university President, Stephen J. Kopp.	
School of Physical Therapy			Located at the St. Mary's Medical Education Center on the campus of St. Mary's Medical Center at 3101 5th Avenue.	

== Other Huntington Locations ==
Building	Image	Constructed	Notes	Reference
President's House		1923	Located at 1040 13th Avenue. It was built in 1923 and acquired by the university in 1972 to replace a previous on-campus President's Home. The first floor is used for University functions and the second floor is the residence of the president.	
Visual Arts Center		2014	Located in the former Stone & Thomas Department Store building in downtown Huntington across from Pullman Square, it was acquired by the university in 2013 and redeveloped in 2014. It is the home of the College of Art and Design and is a museum.	
Veterans Memorial Soccer Complex		2013	Located on the site of the demolished Veterans Memorial Fieldhouse at 2601 5th Avenue, 4 blocks from the main campus, it replaced Sam Hood Field, formerly on the site of the Chris Cline Athletic Complex. Full name is Hoops Family Field at Veterans Memorial Soccer Complex.	

== University Heights ==
An area on the outskirts of town was used as the West Virginia Colored Children's Home (by that time it was actually being used as a sanitarium for elderly black men) and the surrounding farm land (in that era state institutions grew much of their own food) was transferred to the university at the end of segregation as "University Heights", with the intention of developing a second campus. The building was converted into housing for married students, along with a few new apartment buildings, but the property was never developed fully, being used for storage, a baseball field (which was not adequate for the team's needs and eventually abandoned), and much of the property was transferred to other state agencies over the years. In 2011 the buildings were demolished and the remaining property was transferred to the Cabell County Board of Education for a new middle school.

== Marshall University – South Charleston Campus ==
Located in South Charleston, West Virginia at One Angus E. Peyton Drive.

Graduate College Administration Building, completed 1990.

Byrd Academic and Technology Center, completed 1995.

== Byrd Institute ==
The Robert C. Byrd Institute, a non-academic technology transfer division of the university maintains:

RCBI Huntington at 1050 4th Avenue, a former bank building donated to the university.

RCBI South Charleston, on the South Charleston Campus.

RCBI Rocket Center, at 410 State Route 956, on the grounds of the United States Navy Allegheny Ballistics Laboratory.

RCBI Bridgeport, at 2400 East Bennedum Industrial Drive, a NASA facility.

== Statewide Extension ==
The school also has the following off-campus instruction sites. The owned Mid-Ohio Valley Center at One John Marshall Way in Point Pleasant, the leased Teays Valley Center at One Carriage Point in Hurricane, and on the campus of the Southern West Virginia Community and Technical College in Logan and Williamson. The university also has an ownership interest in the Erma Byrd Higher Education Center in suburban Beckley, along with Concord University and Bluefield State College.

The Marshall University Rural Health Clinic, a part of the medical school, is located on Airport Road in Chapmanville, West Virginia.

In 2017, the medical school acquired the former Patriot Coal office building in Scott Depot and converted into the clinical offices as Marshall Health-Teays Valley. It is located at 300 Corporate Center Drive.

== See also ==
- Cityscape of Huntington, West Virginia
- Marshall University
