= Marshall University Visual Arts Center =

Visual Arts Center
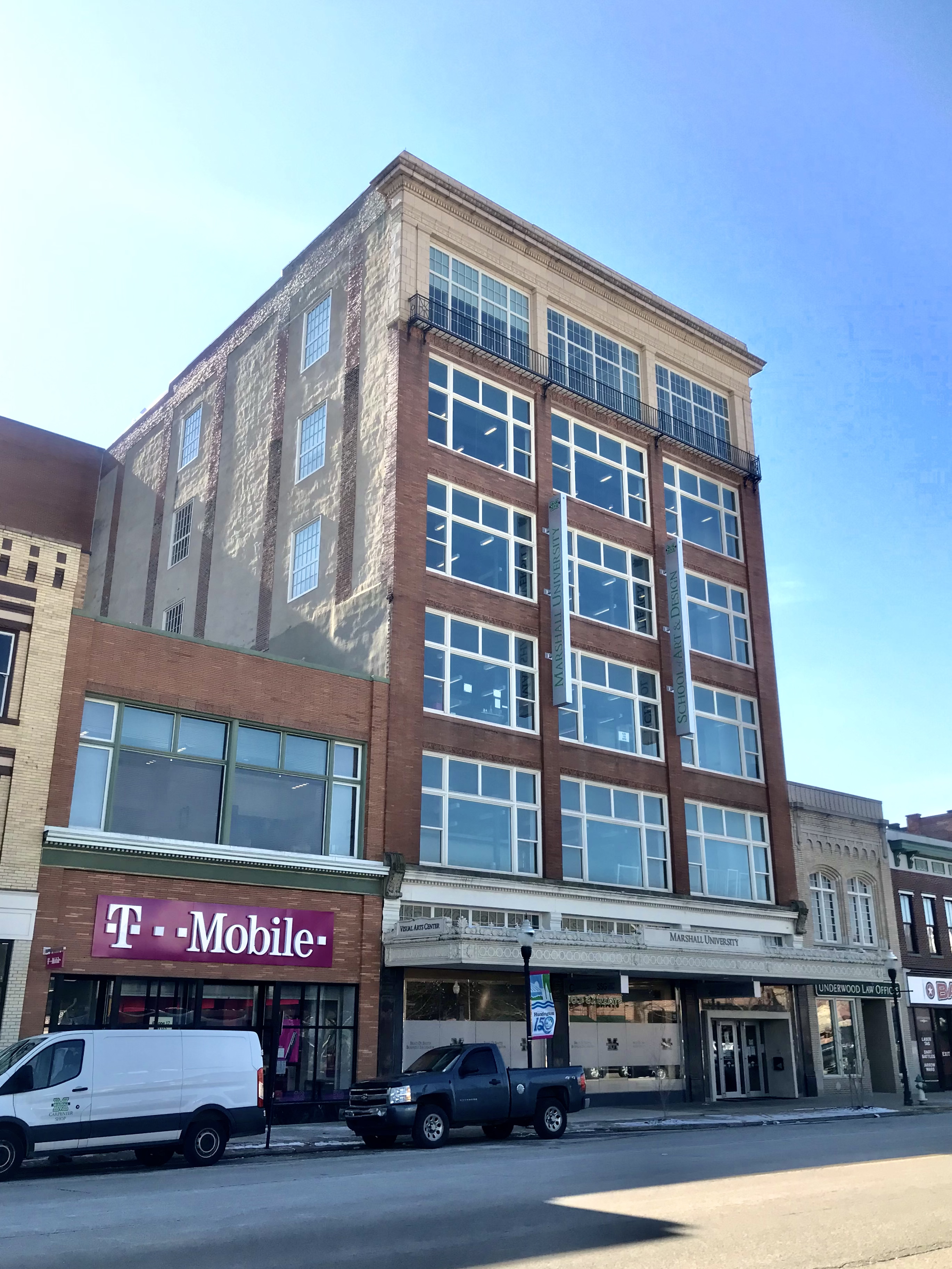
- Visual Arts Center in 2021.
- Interactive map of the Visual Arts Center area
- Former names: Anderson-Newcomb Co. (1902-1980); Stone & Thomas (1980-1996)

General information
- Type: Arts center
- Architectural style: Chicago
- Location: 927 3rd Ave, Huntington, West Virginia 25701
- Coordinates: 38°25′18.804″N 82°26′35.484″W
- Completed: 1902
- Renovated: 2013
- Owner: Marshall University

Technical details
- Floor count: 6

Website
- Official website
- Marshall University Visual Arts Center; Anderson-Newcomb Co. Building
- U.S. Historic district – Contributing property
- Location within West Virginia
- Part of: Downtown Huntington Historic District (ID07000240)
- Designated CP: February 12, 2007

Marshall University Visual Arts Center (originally known as Anderson Newcomb Co. and Stone & Thomas) is an arts center in Huntington, West Virginia, US, next to Pullman Square.

It was listed on the National Register of Historic Places in 2007 under the Downtown Huntington Historic District.

== History ==
=== Anderson Newcomb Co. (1902-1980) ===
In 1894, J.W. Valentine opened a dry goods shop in the current day downtown Huntington. A year later, he partnered with W.H. Newcomb, later naming the store Valentine & Newcomb.

After years of rapid growth, in 1902 Valentine & Newcomb opened a three-store building on 3rd Avenue. Five years later in 1907, Valentine sold his shares of the store to E.G. Anderson, which later renamed the store Anderson Newcomb Co.

In 1920, after years of reconstruction, the Anderson Newcomb Co. building added three floors to the main building. Almost thirty years later, in 1956 two more stories were added to the building.

=== Stone & Thomas (1980-1996) ===
In 1980 the building was purchased by Stone & Thomas, a United States chain of department stores based in Wheeling, West Virginia. Sixteen years after opening, Stone & Thomas closed its Huntington location, due to Bankruptcy issues.

=== Marshall University Visual Arts Center (2013-Present) ===
After sitting abandoned, the building was purchased by Marshall University in 2013, to redevelop it into a home for their visual arts program.

== Features ==
=== Birke Art Gallery ===
In 1977, the Marshall University Art Gallery, which was the first art gallery created by Marshall University. Two years later in 1979, it was renamed the Birke Art Gallery after Helen and William D. Birke, owners of the Huntington Publishing Company.

In 2022, the Birke Art Gallery moved from Smith Hall to the first floor of the Visual Arts Center. Today the gallery is host to a series of rotating exhibitions throughout the year including an annual juried student exhibition.

=== Charles W. and Norma C. Carroll Gallery ===
The Charles W. and Norma C. Carroll Gallery is a 2,200-square-foot gallery on the first floor of the Visual Arts Center. The gallery was renamed in 2015 after Charles and Norma Carrol, two graduates from Marshall University and owners of Carroll Insurance.

The inaugural 2014 exhibition, We ART Marshall, featured artwork by students, faculty, and alumni of Marshall University.

=== Pneumatic Gallery ===
The Pneumatic Gallery is a student art gallery that opened in late 2021. The gallery, renamed in 2024 from the Student Gallery, is strictly a student gallery to practice all aspects of putting on an exhibition.

== See also ==
- Cityscape of Huntington, West Virginia
- List of buildings at Marshall University
- List of museums in Huntington, West Virginia
