= Old Main (Marshall University) =

- U.S. National Register of Historic Places
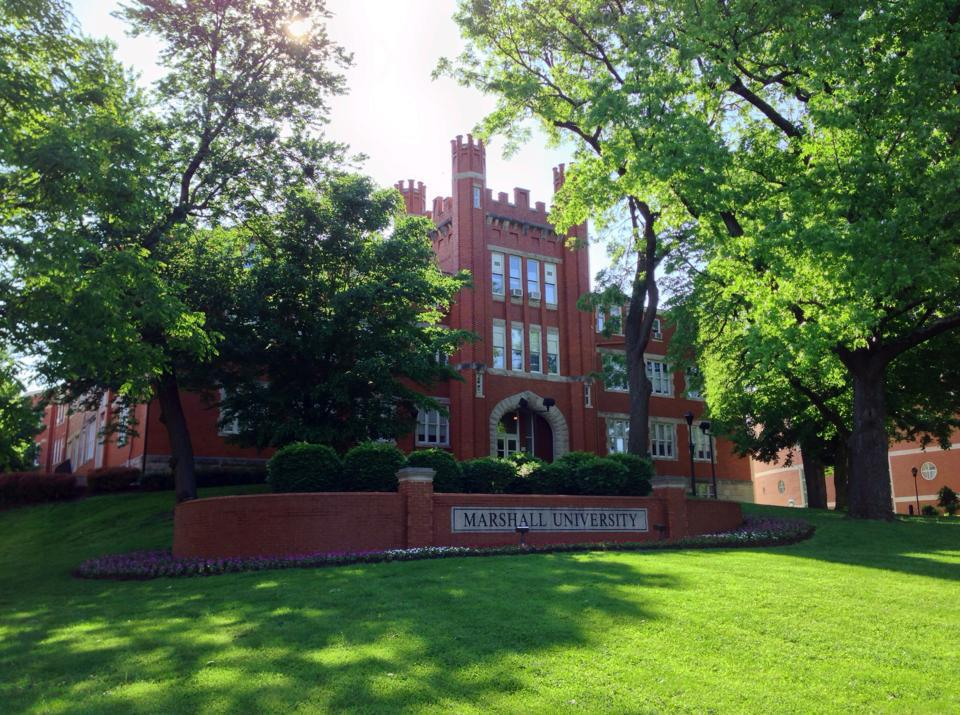
- Old Main is the oldest structure at Marshall University

- Location within West Virginia Location within the United States
- Location: Hal Greer Boulevard, Huntington, West Virginia, on the campus of Marshall University
- Coordinates: 38°25′24″N 82°25′50″W
- Built: 1907
- Architect: Multiple
- Architectural style: Gothic
- NRHP reference No.: 73001899
- Added to NRHP: July 16, 1973

Old Main is a collection of five buildings joined together at central campus of Marshall University in Huntington, West Virginia. It is located at the junction of Hal Greer Boulevard and Fourth Avenue. The oldest part of the structure was completed in 1868 (as an addition to the university's first building, which was razed in 1898), with four other additions that was completed at various intervals until 1907. It is a landmark structure on campus, its towers becoming a "symbol of the university."

== History ==
Old Main occupies a site that was once known as Maple Grove. Before the city of Huntington was incorporated, the location was known more for its virgin timber and its grassy fields than the city that would come to occupy it later. In the 1820s, several local farmers constructed a one-room log cabin that was named the Mount Hebron Church that was used for worship. It was also used as a school during the winter months. In 1837, the farmers decided upon a more substantial school. It was petitioned to the Virginia General Assembly which passed on March 13, 1838. It was named Marshall Academy after John Marshall who had died in 1835; he was a friend of John Laidley, a leading proponent for the school.

In 1839, a two-story brick building was constructed at Maple Grove. The classroom building also featured a chapel. It hosted its first classes in 1838, although the building was not completed until March of the following year. In 1854, an addition was planned for the west side of the structure, along with a third floor for the original two-story structure. The new addition would be three stories tall and include a chapel. Construction began two years later, however, due to a lack of funds, only the first floor chapel was completed in the addition, and the third floor addition had not been started.

Funding issues and the American Civil War halted the construction of the western addition and the third floor until 1867 after the state of West Virginia took control of the college from Virginia. Just three years later, another addition was completed on the west side; a veranda was also constructed that ran the entire length of the structure.

In 1897, the 1839 building was demolished because the three interconnected structures had become too small.

=== New building takes shape ===
In 1895, appropriations were passed for the construction of a new structure. The new building, designed by Architects Frank E. Davis and Henry R. Davis of Baltimore, Maryland, was constructed in fourteen months; it was accepted on November 23, 1896 by the Board of Regents. It was named the "College Building" upon completion. The new three-story "College Building" was built seventy-five feet west of the original Maple Grove complex. Its most distinguishing feature is the large brick tower that contained an observation platform at the top.

In late December 1897, the new female dormitory, "Normal Hall", was completed; it was accepted by the Board of Regents the following year. It was then titled "Ladies Hall" followed by College Hall. After the 1898 building and its attachment to the 1870 building was completed, it still remained separated from the 1896 building.

In 1899, the "Annex" addition from 1870 and the building constructed in 1896 were combined; the easternmost section of the 1896 building was demolished to make room for the new structure. In 1906, a western extension of Old Main was completed. This required the removal of the large bell tower that had once stood in the 1870 addition.

In March 1905, additional monies were appropriated for the construction of a new structure. Called "University Hall," the western attachment to the 1896 building included a commencement hall, eight recreation rooms, five restrooms, two cloak rooms, a study hall, library and gymnasium. Construction began in July 1905 when demolition began on the western tower of the 1896 building. The addition was completed in 1907.

In 1937, the building, previously described as the "Main Hall", was dubbed Old Main in a Marshall College catalog. In 1973, Old Main was placed on the National Register of Historic Sites.

== See also ==
- Buildings at Marshall University
- Cityscape of Huntington, West Virginia
- Marshall University
- National Register of Historic Places listings in Cabell County, West Virginia
