= Health and Wellness Center (Marshall University) =

Coordinates: 38°25′24.8″N 82°25′23.9″W

Health and Wellness Center at Marshall University
- Marshall University Recreation Center
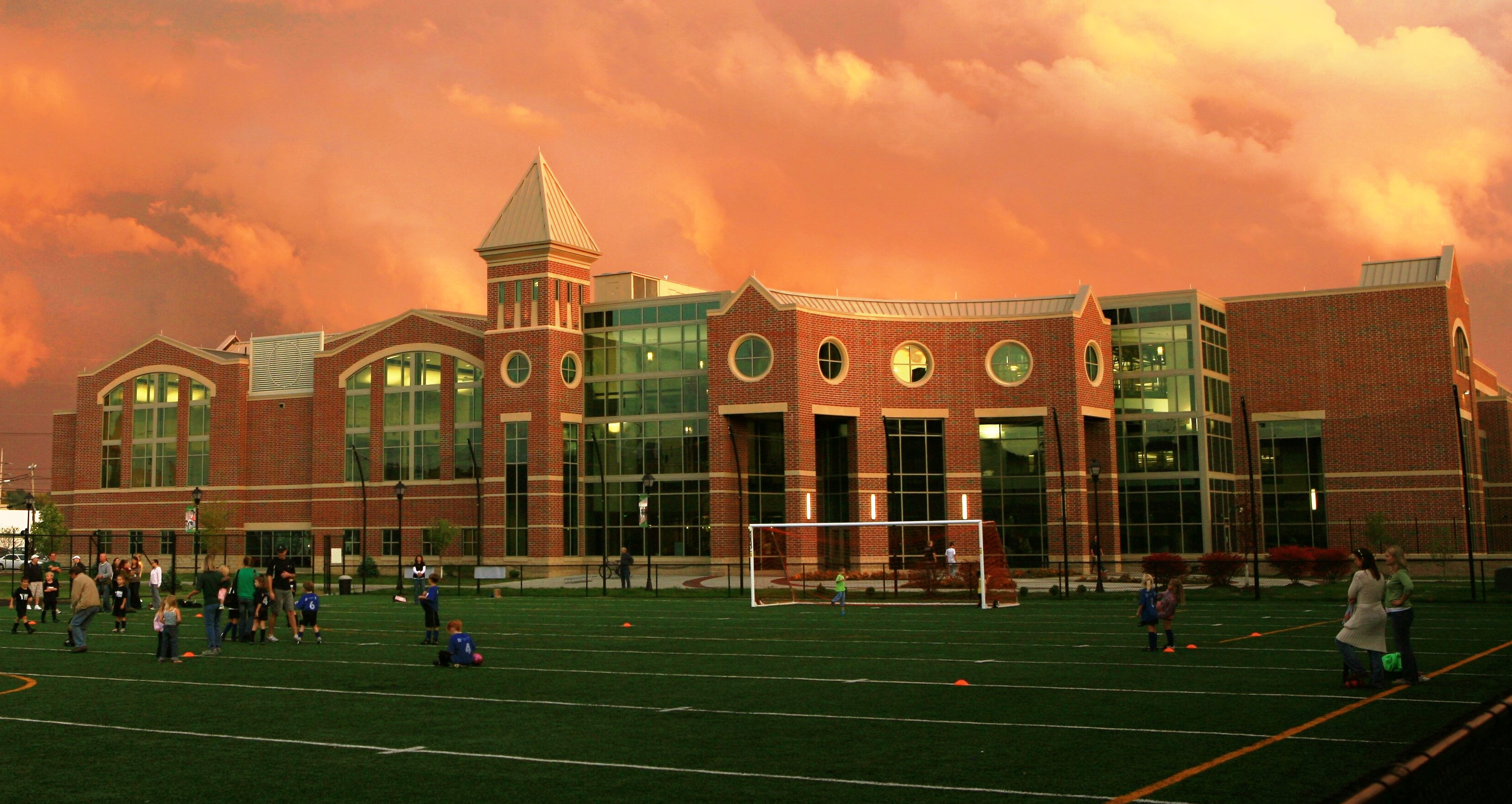
- Interactive map of the Health and Wellness Center at Marshall University area

General information
- Type: Recreation Center
- Location: 402 Thundering Herd Dr, Huntington, West Virginia, 25703, US
- Opened: February 5, 2009
- Affiliation: Marshall University

Other information
- Parking: Joan C. Edwards Stadium

Website
- Official website

The Marshall Recreation Center at Marshall University is located at 5th Avenue and 20th Street in Huntington, West Virginia. The complex is part of a $95 million expansion plan that includes two new "living-learning" residence halls.

== History ==
The Health and Wellness Center was proposed in a Board of Governors meeting on November 10, 2004, by the campus Student Government Association.

On October 12, 2006, Marshall University purchased the Twentieth Street Baptist Church for $1 million with the intent of demolition. The church's first service dates back to December 1926 and hosted its last service on March 25. On January 24, 2007, the school's board of governors approved a contract to tear down the church in early May; demolition began on May 21.

Construction on the 123,000 sq ft (11,400 m^{2}) recreational center began in July 2007 and was completed and opened to the public on February 5, 2009, at 2pm. The facility features an aquatic center with a 20-person spa, 3 lap lanes, vortex pool, and leisure area, a three-story climbing wall, a 1/7 mile running/jogging/walking track, courts for racquetball, volleyball and basketball, 4 specialized fitness rooms, and an 80,000-square-foot (7,400 m^{2}), 2 floor fitness area with free weights, Nautilus, and cardiovascular machines.

== Financing ==
On May 14, 2007, the university Board of Governors approved a resolution on a partnership between the university and Capstone Management. Capstone will own and operate the facilities until it has a return on investment. The public-private partnership, the first in the state of West Virginia, will help speed up construction and keeps other projects, such as the Engineering laboratory, in the pipeline. It will also help keep the new buildings off the balance sheet.

The expansion is being funded with different bonds by two entities. The university's bonds are insured, while Capstone's are without worth at the moment because the company will not have a return on investment until 2018. The public-private partnership will only work if the buildings create a revenue stream; the dormitory collects housing fees, while the student recreation center collects student fees. The funds will pay off the bonds. Capstone will own and operate the facilities for 30 years when ownership will transfer to the university.

== See also ==
- Buildings at Marshall University
- Cityscape of Huntington, West Virginia
- Marshall University
