= Love Hardware Building =

Historic building in Huntington, West Virginia

- U.S. National Register of Historic Places
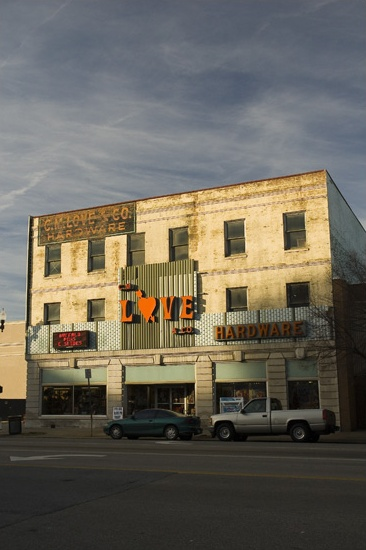
- Love Hardware Building before facelift, in 2006.

- Location within West Virginia Location within the United States
- Location: 1002 3rd Ave, Huntington, West Virginia 25701
- Coordinates: 38°25′21.396″N 82°26′32.604″W
- Architectural style: Classical Revival
- Restored: 2010
- Part of: Downtown Huntington Historic District (ID86000309)
- NRHP reference No.: 07000240
- Added to NRHP: 2007

The Love Hardware Building is a three-story historic commercial building next to Pullman Square. It was built in 1926 with Classical Revival architecture, to hold the Love Hardware store open until 2010. The building later was restored in 2010, to serve as a modern commercial building.

It was listed on the National Register of Historic Places in the Downtown Huntington Historic District with a boundary increase in 2007.
