= First United Methodist Church (Huntington, West Virginia) =

- U.S. National Register of Historic Places
- The First United Methodist Church in 2015.
- Location: 1124 5th Ave, Huntington, West Virginia 25701
- Coordinates: 38°25′14.34″N 82°26′20.436″W
- Built: 1913
- Architectural style: Gothic Revival
- Part of: Downtown Huntington Historic District
- NRHP reference No.: 86000309
- Added to NRHP: 1986

The First United Methodist Church, originally known as Methodist-Episcopal Church, is a tall two-story, with a red clay tile roof. It was built in 1913, with Gothic Revival architecture that sits across the street from the Fifth Avenue Baptist Church.

It was listed on the National Register of Historic Places in the Downtown Huntington Historic District in 1986.

== See also ==
- National Register of Historic Places listings in Cabell County, West Virginia
