= Downtown Huntington Historic District =

US national historic district in West Virginia

- U.S. National Register of Historic Places
- U.S. Historic district
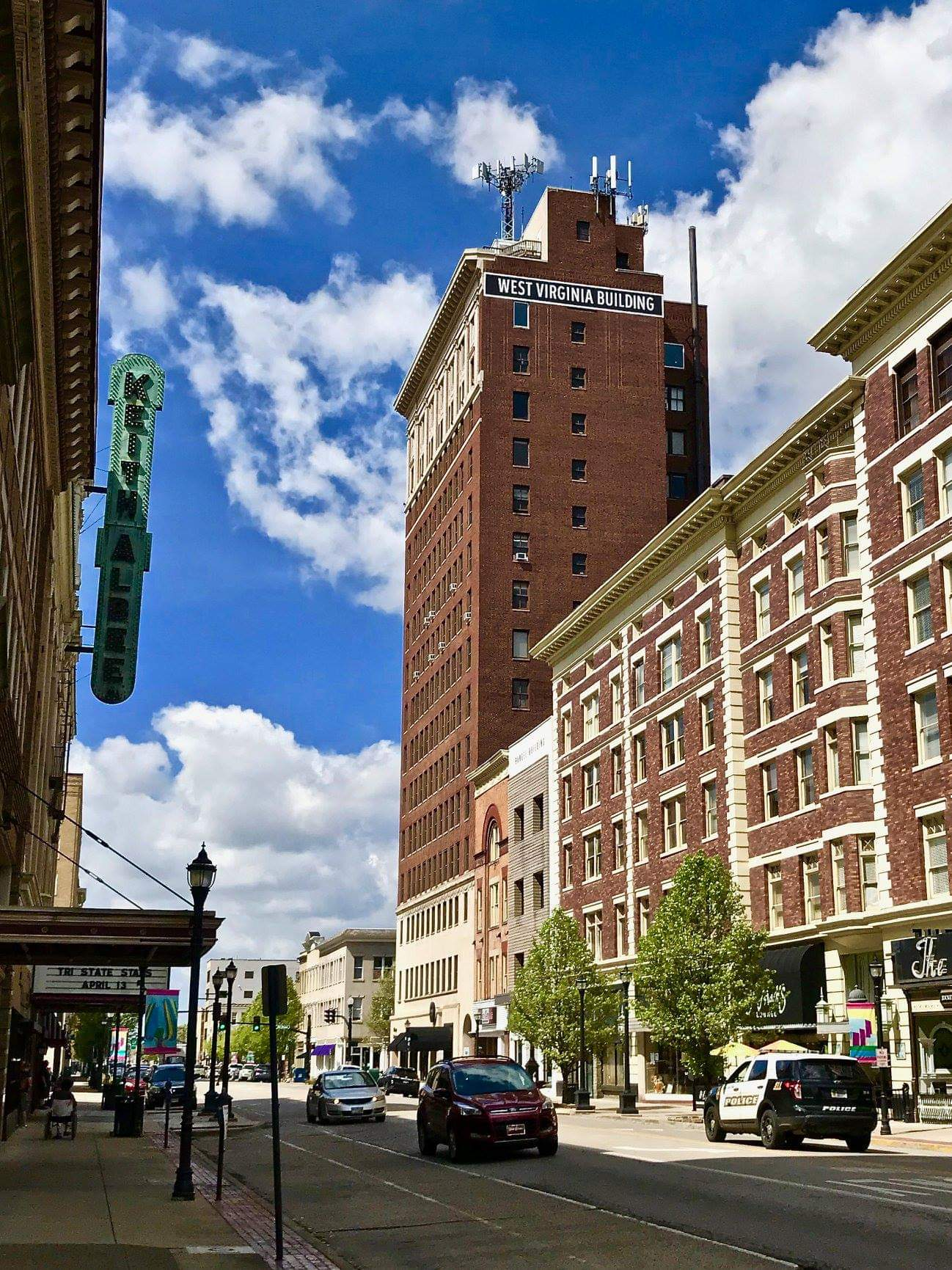
- Fourth Avenue in the Downtown Huntington Historic District

- Location within West Virginia Location within the United States
- Location: Roughly bounded by 3rd Ave., 10th St., 5th Ave., and 7th and 8th Sts.; also portions of 3rd Ave. to the alley between 6th and 7th Aves. and from 12th St. to 7th St., Huntington, West Virginia
- Coordinates: 38°26′2″N 82°24′33″W
- Area: 70 acres (28 ha)
- Architectural style: Gothic Revival, Late Victorian, Art Deco, Baroque
- NRHP reference No.: 86000309, 07000240
- Added to NRHP: February 24, 1986, expanded March 22, 2007

Downtown Huntington Historic District is a national historic district located at Huntington, Cabell County, West Virginia. The original district encompassed 59 contributing buildings; the boundary increase added 53 more contributing buildings. It includes the central business district of Huntington and includes several of its municipal and governmental buildings. It contains the majority of the historic concentration of downtown commercial buildings. Located in the district are the separately listed Carnegie Public Library, Cabell County Courthouse, U.S. Post Office and Court House, and Campbell-Hicks House.

It was listed on the National Register of Historic Places in 1986. A boundary increase occurred in 2007.

== Notable buildings ==
Notable buildings in the district include:

- Anderson-Newcomb/Stone & Thomas Building (c. 1902)
- Davis Opera House (c. 1885)
- Central Huntington Garage/Hines Building (c. 1925)
- Frederick Building (1906)
- Gideon Building (c. 1915)
- Huntington Arcade (1925)
- Huntington City Hall (1915)
- Keith-Albee Theatre (1928)
- Love Hardware Building (c. 1884)
- Morrison Building (1919)
- Reuschleins Jewelry building (1923)
- The Wesvanawha Building (1929-originally Lewis Building)
- West Virginia Building (c. 1924)

=== Churches ===
- Fifth Avenue Baptist Church (1916)
- First Presbyterian Church (1895)
- First United Methodist Church/First Methodist Episcopal Church (1913)
- Johnson Memorial Church (c.1886/1912/1935)
- Trinity Episcopal Church (1882)

== See also ==
- List of neighborhoods in Huntington, West Virginia
- National Register of Historic Places listings in Cabell County, West Virginia
