= Cityscape of Huntington, West Virginia =

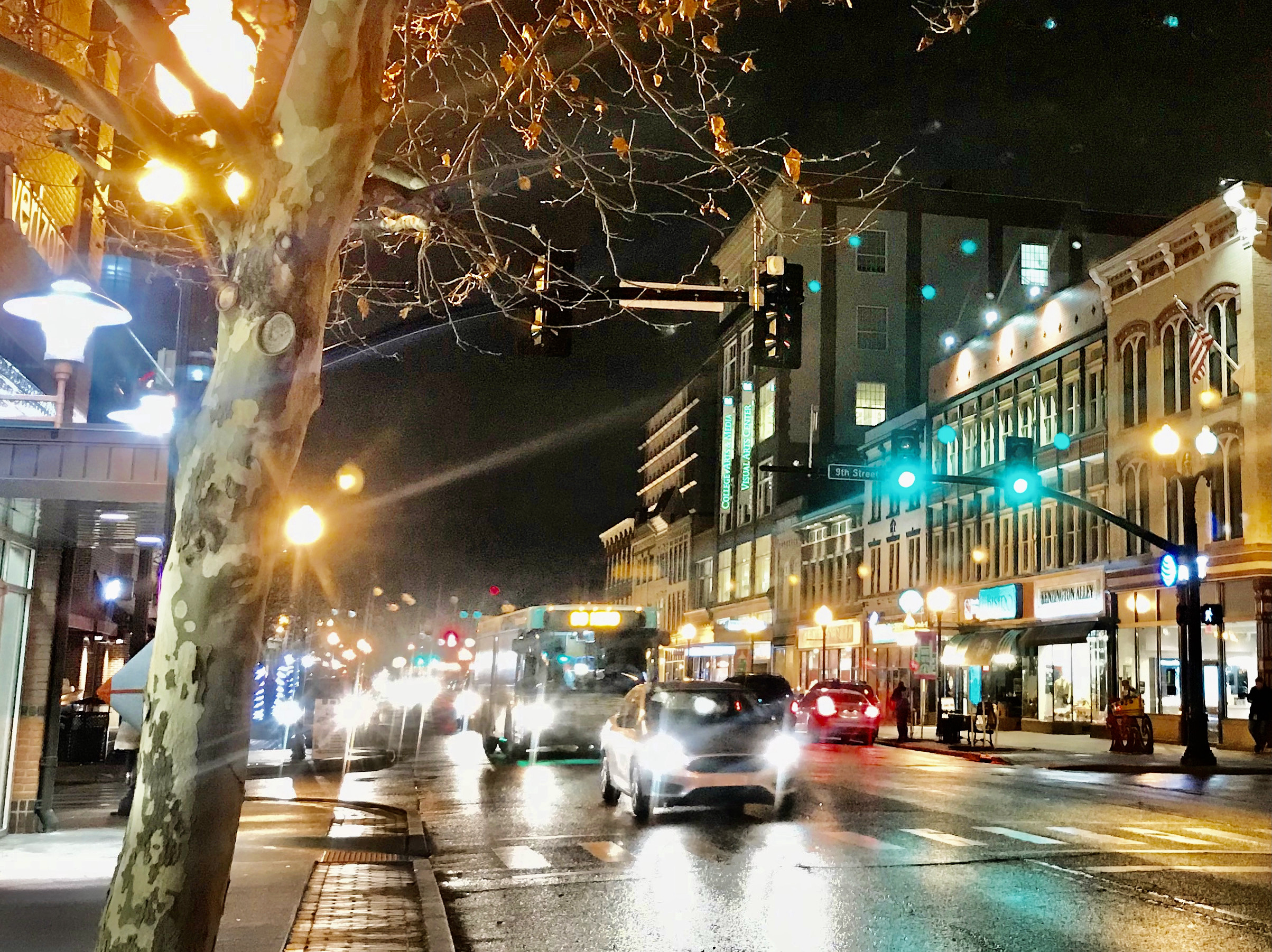
Third Avenue, one of Huntington's wide, boulevard-style streets

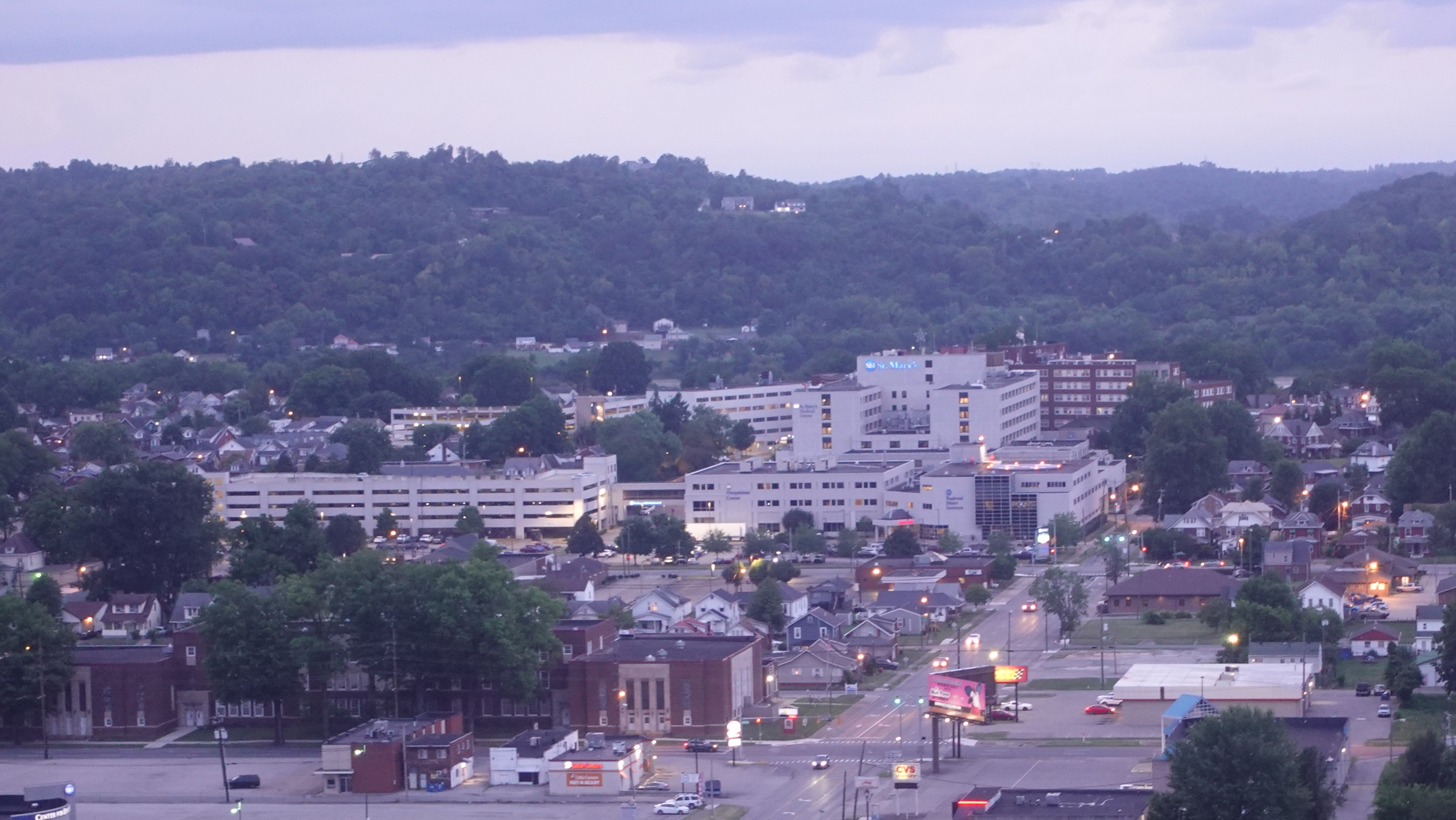
St. Mary's Medical Center from Rotary Park View in 2024.

Huntington, West Virginia's central business district is located to the south of the Ohio River, east of the Robert C. Byrd Bridge, and west of Hal Greer Boulevard. Broad avenues and streets dominate the streetscape, creating for the most part an even grid pattern. Another business district is in Old Central City, known for its numerous antique shops and Heiner's Bakery.

Several major industries line the river, from the Steel of West Virginia industrial complex next to Marshall University to Special Metals, located along the Guyandotte River in the Altizer neighborhood. The proximity of the Ohio River played an important role in the development of heavy industry in the 19th and 20th centuries. The Rust Belt deindustrialization era of the 1970s led to a decline in the industrial base and, subsequently, Huntington's population.

The saving grace, in terms of employment, has been the steadily growing service sector. Two major hospitals, St. Mary's and Cabell-Huntington, have seen major expansion projects that have doubled their footprints during the past twenty years.

The city's architecture contains a wealth of historic structures, most built during the boom of the Baltimore and Ohio Railroad and the Chesapeake and Ohio Railway. Notable structures include the 12-story St. James Building (housing The First State Bank), with its huge Doric columns presenting a grand entrance to the ornate lobby. The West Virginia Building is a deep-red brick structure that looms over 4th Avenue. At the time of its completion, it was the tallest tower in the state, but it has since fallen to 18th, behind the office towers of Charleston. Numerous other notable buildings are scattered throughout the downtown, ranging from the beautifully restored Guaranty Bank and Trust Building to the high-rise Coal Exchange Building. Grand residential homes and mansions line Ritter Creek and the steep hills that loom behind it, many built by the railroad barons of the past.

== Downtown ==
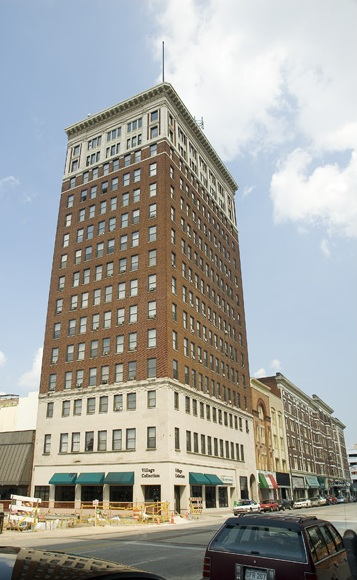
The West Virginia Building is the tallest building in Huntington.

=== Urban renewal ===
During the 1960s and 1970s, major urban renewal projects began in Huntington. Four square blocks between 3rd Avenue and what is now Veterans Memorial Boulevard were demolished. One block was utilized for the construction of the Huntington Civic Center, while another featured a Wendy's fast-food restaurant and an apartment building. Two square blocks remained a vast parking lot for the greater part of 30 years, bordered by 8th Street, Veterans Memorial Boulevard, 10th Street, and 3rd Avenue, and was nicknamed the Superblock. The inclusion of a Chi-Chi's Mexican restaurant on a small corner parcel in the early 1990s was the only development along the Superblock. The urban renewal effort of the past also produced the Radisson Hotel complex along 3rd Avenue, a new Mack and Dave's storefront, and Heritage Station. It also spawned the pedestrian-only 9th Street Plaza.

A new Holiday Inn hotel complex was constructed in 1998 between 8th and 9th streets. In 2004, construction began on Pullman Square, a lifestyle center, which consumed the remainder of the Superblock. It opened later that year.

In July 2006, work began on the improved 9th Street Plaza, which features 12-foot (3.7 m) sidewalks, outdoor seating for restaurants, two 11-foot (3.4 m) travel lanes, and center angled parking. Brick pedestals were constructed that hold two spires from the former 6th Street Bridge, installed at the entrances to the plaza at 3rd and 5th avenues. The new 9th Street Plaza reopened on December 1, 2006, and creates a symbolic link between the Pullman Square district and the remainder of downtown.

As a result of much needed downtown investment, numerous properties have been renovated or are in the process of renovations, and new storefronts and lofts are being constructed. One of the spin-offs from the construction of Pullman Square was the renovation of the 900 block of 3rd Avenue, which was nearly all vacant. The renovation of numerous facades elsewhere, such as the removal of metal sheathing over brickwork, have been ongoing. During the construction of Pullman Square, the renovations along the 900 block of 3rd Avenue commenced, with most storefronts now being rented out. On the Friday after Thanksgiving in 2007, Le Cook Store opened across from Pullman Square; the Marshall Community and Technical College's Culinary Institute, which offers cooking classes and sample food tastings, also opened. Another tenant, C.F. Reuschlein Jewelers, opened during the same month along the block.

==== New vision ====
On June 5, 1999, a study was unveiled for streetscape improvements, some of which was later incorporated as part of the Pullman Square and 9th Street Plaza projects. The study reported that the "old downtown of department stores" was gone and that successful downtowns of today need to attract "residential development in upper stories" in which retail stores would follow, and then offices and restaurants. Some of the recommendations included:

- Revitalize downtown Huntington as a critical step in revitalizing the entire region's image and economy.
- Increasing funding for the Huntington Main Street program.
- Welcoming signs at 8th Street and 10th Street underpasses.
- Develop the Superblock.
- Encourage residential development in the upper floors of buildings.
- Strengthen existing downtown retailers and add new retail, restaurant and entertainment venues.
- Seek professional offices for the downtown.
- Enhance the downtown's physical appearance.
- "Improve vehicular and pedestrian access, flow and environments."
- Improve the perception of ample and convenient parking in the downtown.
- Create a destination draw for the downtown based upon the combination of the area's "natural history, cultural history, museums, musical offerings and other special features."

=== Heritage Station ===
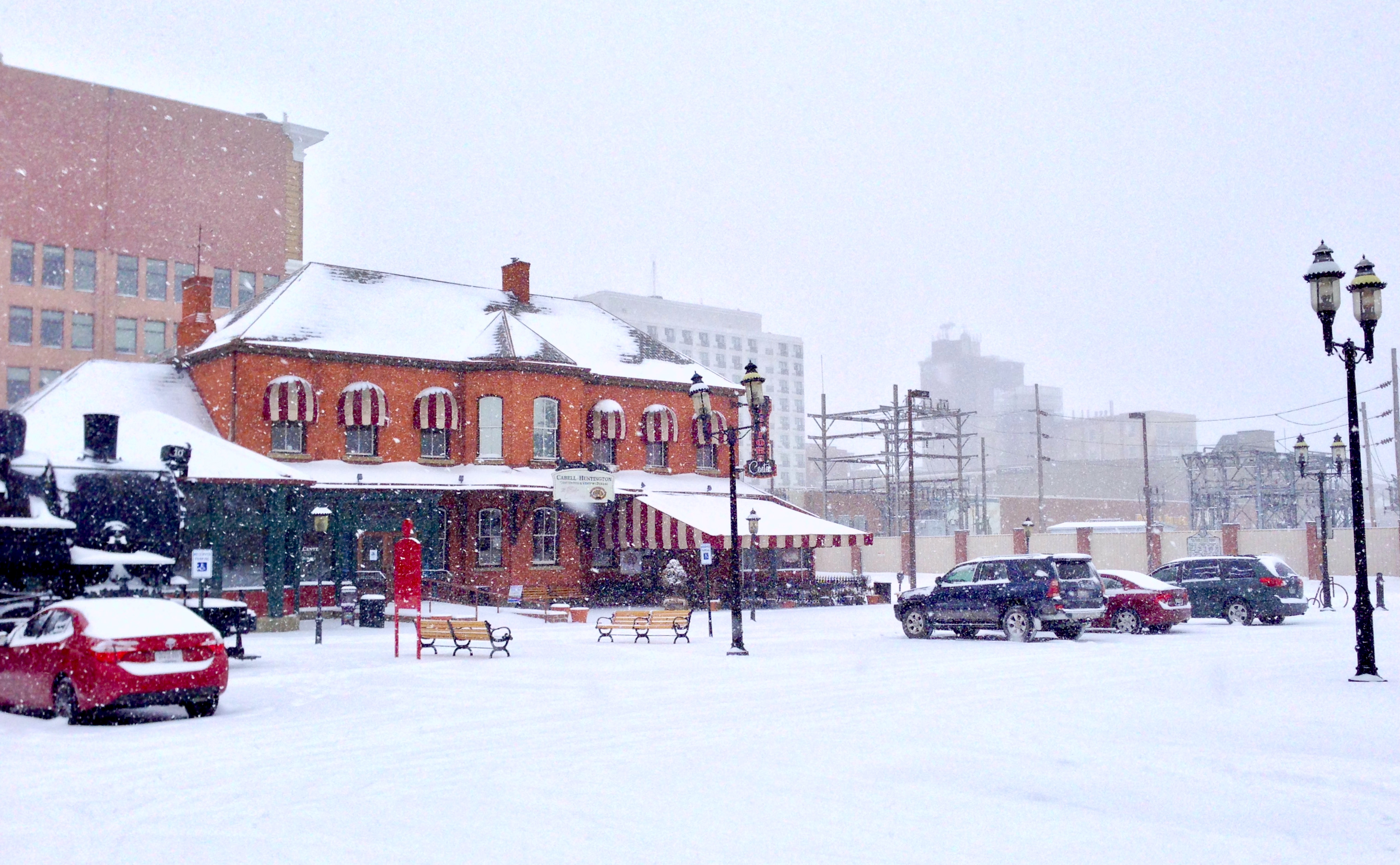
Heritage Station in 2015.

During the height of the urban renewal projects of the 1960s and 1970s, community and local leaders became involved with the fund-raising efforts of the Cabell-Wayne Historical Society and the Collis P. Huntington Railroad Historical Society. The goal was to create a unique downtown shopping, dining, and entertainment complex with a mix of historical structures relocated from other sites in Huntington. Although it is now considered a "lifestyle center", it was at the time a rather novel idea in a push to get traffic into the downtown area.

Heritage Village (now Heritage Station) was completed on September 2, 1977. It features the 1892 Baltimore and Ohio Railroad passenger station, a 1911 B&O Railroad freight house, and the 1871 Bank of Huntington building. The railroad structures from the B&O became obsolete in 1965 with the consolidation of its operations into the Chesapeake and Ohio Railway in Huntington. The C&O donated two boxcars, and the railroad historical society donated a steam engine and a Southern Railway sleeping car, also called a Pullman.

Located at the corner of Veterans Memorial Blvd and 11th Street in Downtown Huntington, Heritage Station is now a lifestyle center, with locally owned shops.

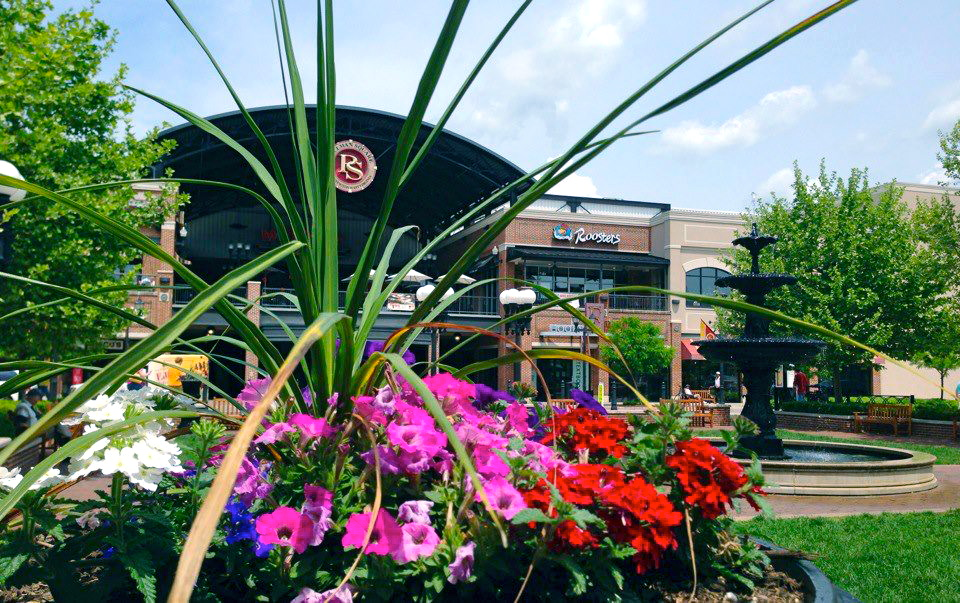
Pullman Square, the centerpiece of Huntington's urban renewal efforts

=== Pullman Square ===
Pullman Square is a lifestyle center in downtown Huntington between 8th and 10th streets and 3rd Avenue and Veterans Memorial Boulevard. It is located on what was known as the "Superblock", a large urban renewal project that saw the demolishing of four city-square blocks in 1970. The collection of one- and two-story structures includes the 16-screen movie theater, Marquee Cinemas. It also includes numerous retail establishments and restaurants.

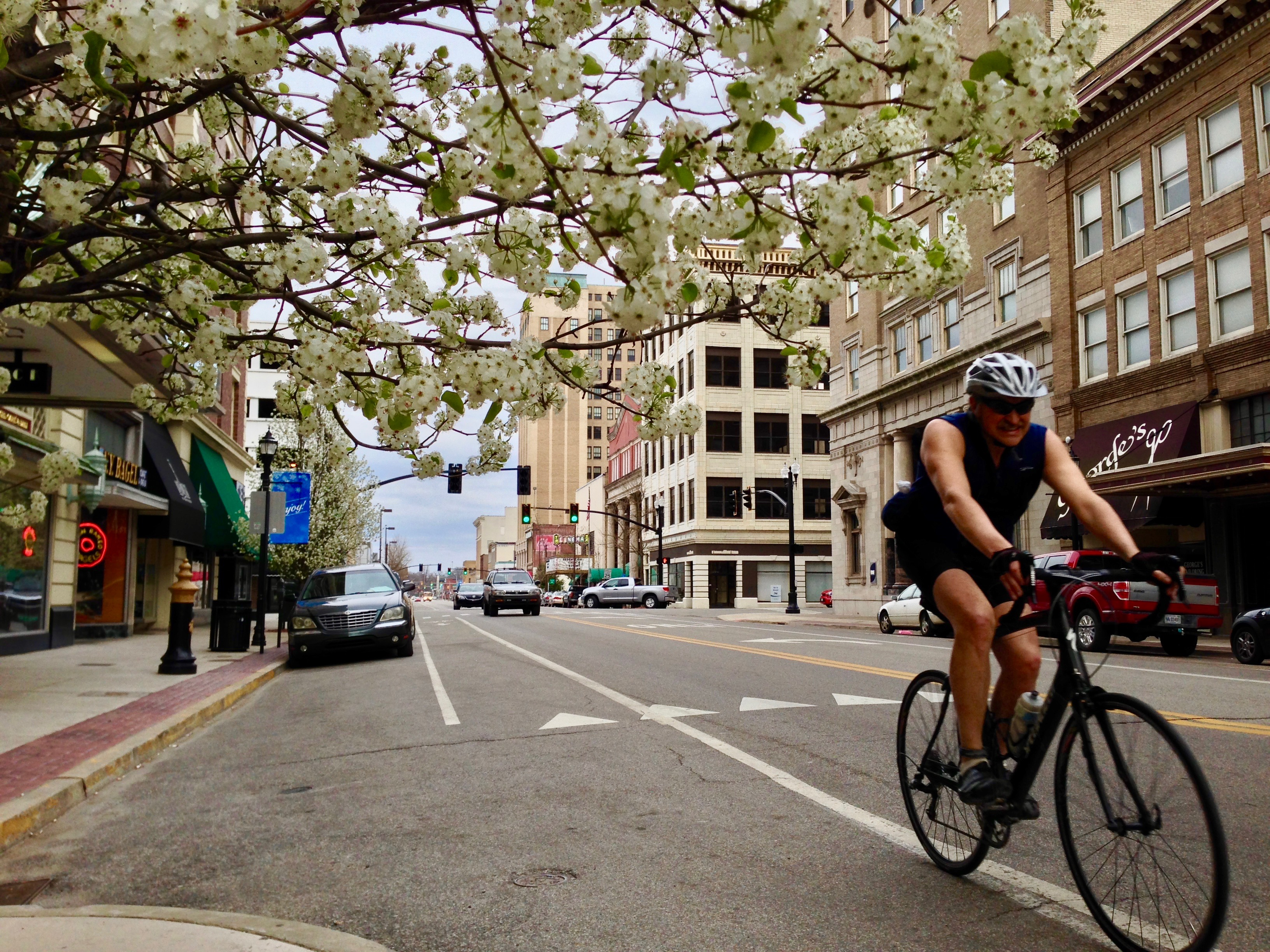
A cyclist utilizes the bicycle lanes on Fourth Avenue.

=== Old Main ===
The Old Main Corridor project, envisioned originally as a streetscape redevelopment of 4th Avenue between Hal Greer Boulevard to 6th Street in downtown Huntington, was revamped and unveiled on October 31, 2006, at the Memorial Student Center of Marshall University. The goal is to connect the downtown and the university by "building off the success of Pullman Square."

The original plan, designed in 2003, entailed the construction of gardens and a public plaza along Hal Greer Boulevard at 4th and 5th avenues adjacent to Marshall University, along with the streetscape improvements. The gardens and public plazas were eliminated from the revamped plans due to cost. The new design is estimated to cost $2.5 million. Funding has been secured for the project between 9th and 10th streets along 4th Avenue with construction beginning in 2007. $350,000 has been requested in a federal transportation enhancement grant that would cover the cost of streetscape improvements between Hal Greer Boulevard and 12th Street; construction on that section could begin in 2008.

The final result will include the repaving of 4th Avenue and the reduction of lanes from four to two—one lane in each direction with left-turn lanes at each intersection—and the addition of bike lanes from Hal Greer Boulevard to 6th Street; on-street parking will not be affected. New trees and street lights, similar to what was installed along 3rd Avenue near Pullman Square and along 9th Street, will be installed along 4th Avenue. Other safety improvement projects and traffic calming features, such as the replacing of sidewalks and curb extensions, will enhance pedestrian safety.

== Kinetic Park ==
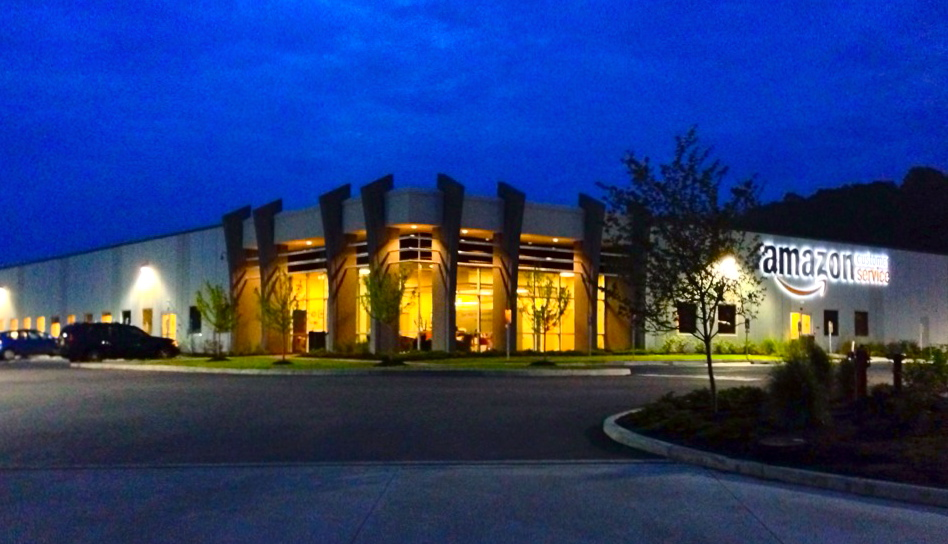
Amazon Customer Service Center in Kinetic Park.

Kinetic Park is a 95-acre (380,000 m^{2}) technology park being developed along Interstate 64 in Huntington. There are two sections of Kinetic Park. The lower section of the park will be used for commercial businesses, and the upper section of the park will be used for technology startups and corporations. Currently, there are three commercial and eleven technology lots available.

=== Commercial outlots ===
The lower level of Kinetic Park has over 12 acres (49,000 m^{2}) available for commercial uses that will complement the Technology Park area. Intended uses include restaurants, lodging, banking, personal services and other retail businesses that can conveniently serve employees of the Technology Park and surrounding area.

=== Technology park ===
The upper level of Kinetic Park consists of nearly 23 acres (93,000 m^{2}) available for businesses that desire a signature location within a state-of-the-art high technology equipped office park. The first tenants, Huntington Dermatology and Sullivan Webb, were to move into a new 10,000 sq ft (930 m^{2}) structure in spring 2007. Amazon.com began construction on a new customer support call center at the site in July 2011, to replace the call center it had located in downtown Huntington. Work on the building was completed the following October and was opened soon afterwards.

== Marshall University ==
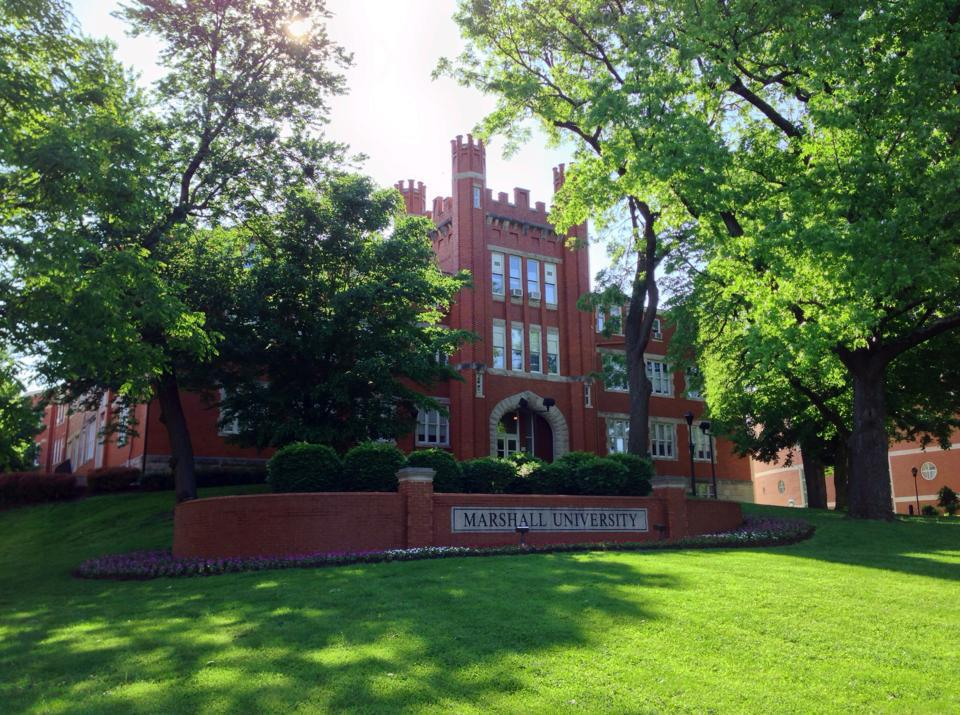
Old Main is the oldest building on Marshall University's campus.

There are numerous historical and modern buildings at Marshall University. The tallest of these are the Twin Towers, and the oldest is Old Main. In 2007, construction was expected to begin on the Health and Wellness Center, which includes two new dormitories and a parking garage.

== Gallery ==
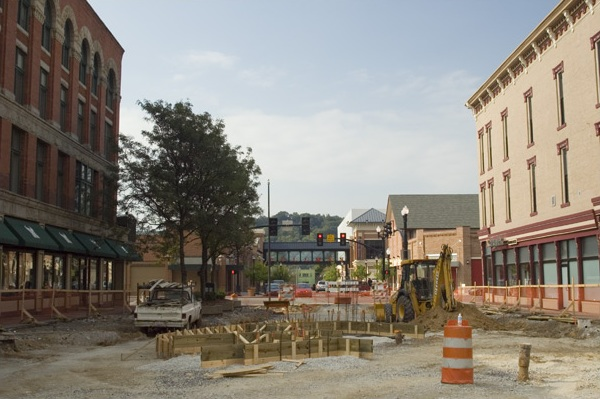
The failed 9th Street Plaza project of the 1970s is undergoing reconstruction.

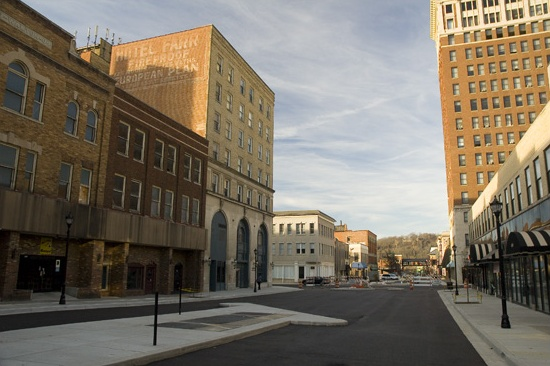
9th Street Plaza renovations are wrapping up in this image taken November 25, 2006.

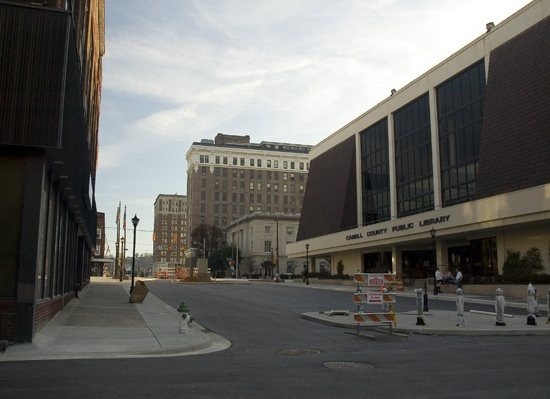
Looking south. The pedestal in the background will hold a spire from the old Robert C. Byrd Bridge.

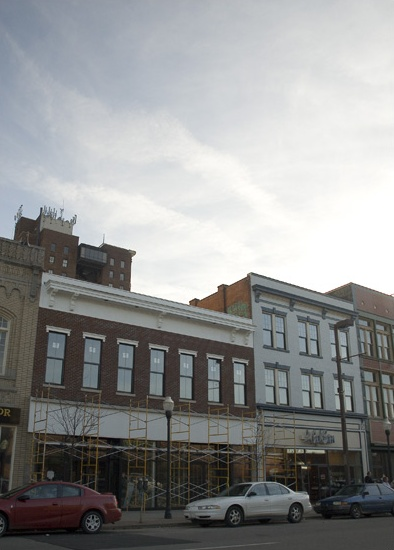
Buildings under renovations along 3rd Avenue across from Pullman Square. The building at left had its façade removed since it was badly damaged during a 1950-1960s era "renovation", but the reinstallation of an earlier resemblance is remarkable. The building at right is slated to become The Cook Store, a high end kitchen store.

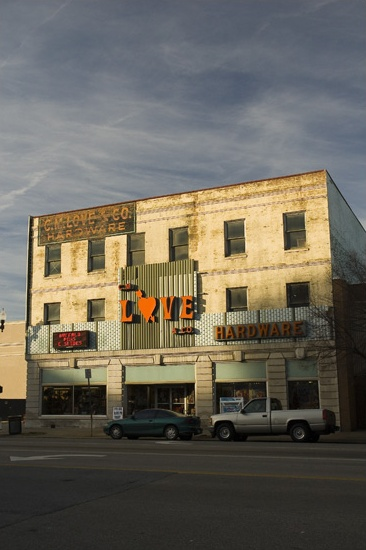
Love's Hardware along 3rd Avenue between Pullman Square and Mack and Dave's is receiving a much needed facelift and renovation. The metal façade is being removed in favor of a restored brick front. Lofts will occupy the second and third floors.

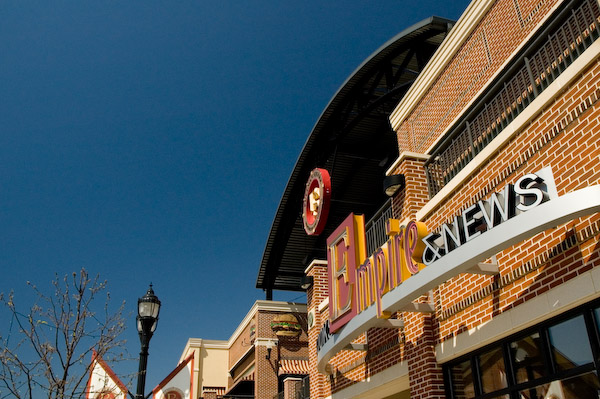
Empire News and Books at Pullman Square

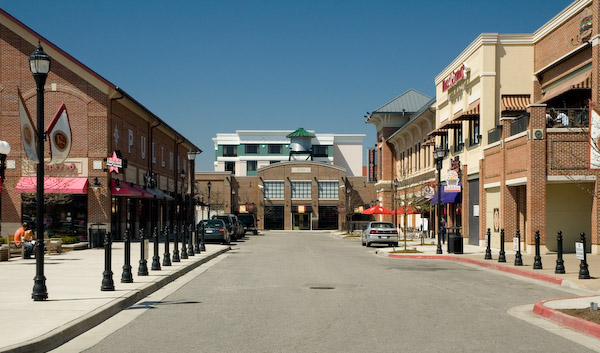
Pullman Square

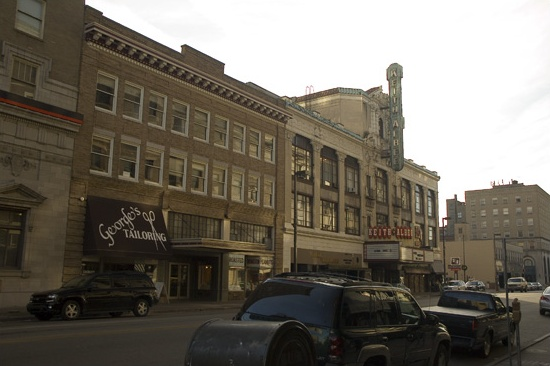
Along 4th Avenue in downtown Huntington. Huntington Arcade is visible to the left and Keith Albee is to the right.
