= Fairfield Stadium =

Stadium in West Virginia, US (1928–1990)

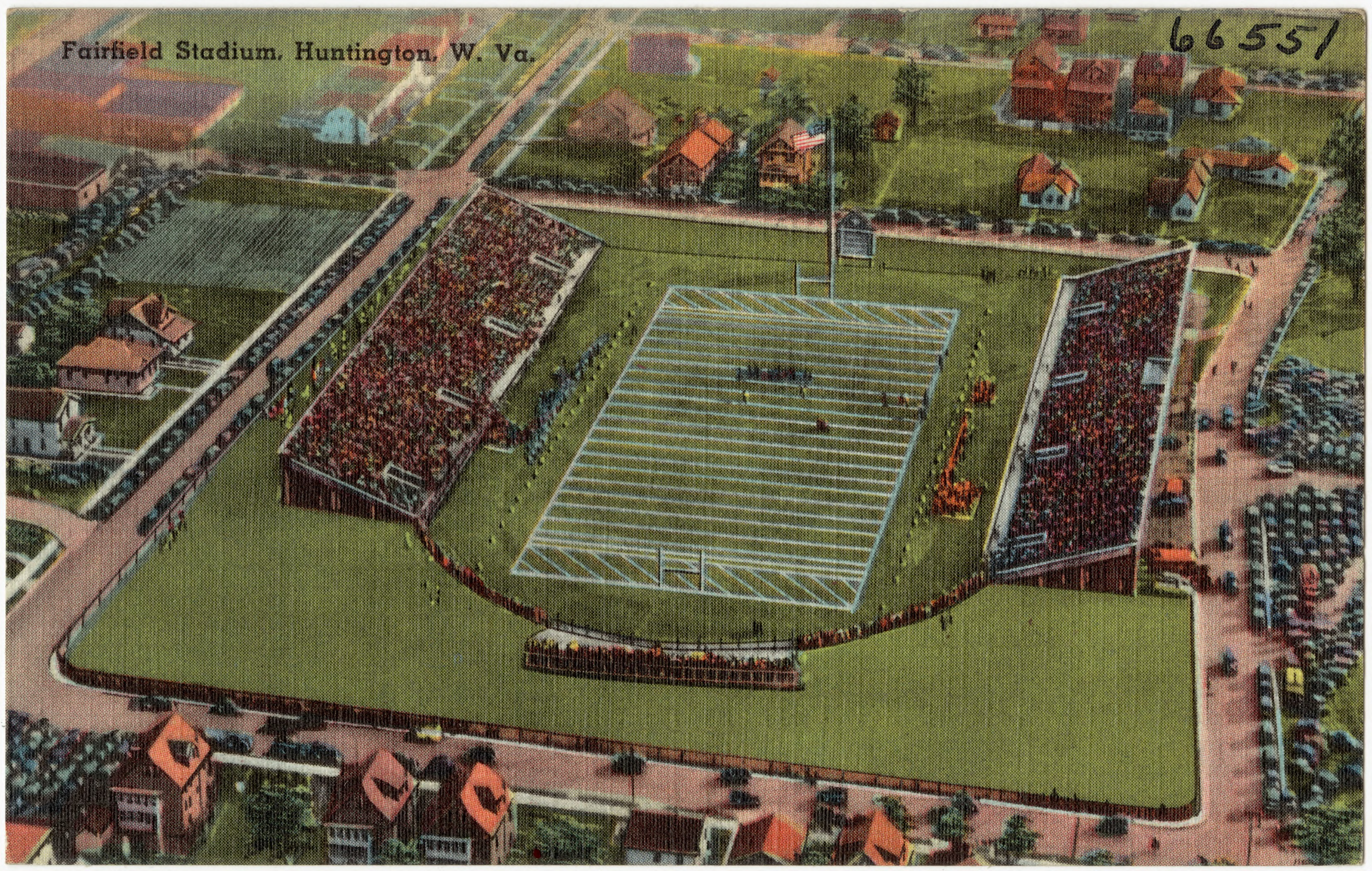
- Postcard showing the stadium

- Location in West Virginia Location in the United States
- Location: Huntington, West Virginia
- Coordinates: 38.410113°N 82.431761°W
- Owner: City of Huntington
- Operator: City of Huntington
- Capacity: 10,000 (1928–1975); 18,000 (1976–1983); 17,312 (1984–1990)

Construction
- Groundbreaking: 1926
- Built: 1928
- Opened: October 6, 1928
- Closed: 1990
- Demolished: 2004
- Cost: $200,000 ($3.64 million in 2025 dollars)

Tenant
- Marshall Thundering Herd (NCAA) (1928–1990)

Fairfield Stadium was a stadium in Huntington, West Virginia. It was primarily used for football, and was the home field of the Marshall University football team between 1928 and 1990, prior to the opening of Joan C. Edwards Stadium.

== History ==
The original stadium was a red brick structure that featured a grass field circled by a cinder track and was owned by the city and mostly maintained by community volunteers.

In 1970, a major renovation project was completed that expanded the seating capacity by 5,000 seats, bringing it to 18,000. An artificial grass playing surface was installed, and the playing surface was lowered. Along with that, a new press box and locker room for the home team was constructed. The 1970 season ended with the crash of Southern Airways Flight 932 on November 14, which killed all 75 people aboard, including 37 players and six coaches.

The stadium fell into disrepair in the 1970s and 80s. In 1984, the original 1927 east side was torn down after being found unsafe. It was replaced by temporary aluminum bleachers.

For the 1991 season, visiting teams were forced to dress at Fairfield and then ride the team bus more than a mile to and from the new stadium for the game. This is because the Shewey Athletic Center, which houses Joan C. Edwards Stadium's locker rooms, was not completed. (Marshall used facilities in the Cam Henderson Center near the new stadium). MU soccer, which had played there from the program's founding, continued to use the field until 1993, when it also moved to Joan C. Edwards Stadium. Today that program has its own soccer specific stadium, the Veterans Memorial Soccer Complex, on the site of the former Veterans Memorial Fieldhouse.

The stadium was also used by the former Huntington High School and Huntington East High School (the merger of those schools, which is the current Huntington High, has its own on-campus stadium).

In addition to high school football, Fairfield was also a regular host for Huntington St. Joseph Central Catholic High School soccer matches and sectional and regional soccer matches. In 1988 Fairfield Stadium served as the host for the inaugural WVSSAC Boys State Soccer Tournament which was won by Huntington St. Joe. It continued as host in 1989 until the tournament was moved to Laidley Field in Charleston.

Fairfield Stadium was demolished in early 2004. For the movie We Are Marshall, filmed in 2006, Herndon Stadium in Atlanta was used.

The last scoreboard from Fairfield Stadium was salvaged and put in the parking lot of Gino's Pub and Pizzeria on Fifth Avenue across the street from the Veterans Memorial Soccer Complex and a few blocks east of Joan C. Edwards Stadium. The scoreboard is lit up at night and shows the score of the Marshall-Xavier game in 1971, which was Marshall's first win after the plane crash.

The Marshall University Forensic Science Center complex completed in 1997 incorporates the renovated former football locker room of Fairfield that was used until the completion of Joan C. Edwards Stadium in 1991. A lone locker with a football jersey, football helmet, and a plaque commemorating the 1970 football team can be found on display in the lobby of the DNA Forensic laboratory. The remainder of the property is now used by the Erma Byrd Clinic, the primary classroom structure for second year students at the Joan C. Edwards School of Medicine.
