= Central Huntington Garage =

- U.S. National Register of Historic Places
- The Central Huntington Garage in 2015.
- Location: 924 5th Ave, Huntington, West Virginia 25701
- Coordinates: 38°25′11.28″N 82°26′33.504″W
- Built: 1927
- Architect: James B. Stewart; Edwin N. Alger
- Architectural style: Italianate
- Part of: Downtown Huntington Historic District
- NRHP reference No.: 86000309
- Added to NRHP: 1986

The Central Huntington Garage, also known as the Hines Building, is a four-story, flat roof commercial building that houses Jim's Steak and Spaghetti House. It was built in 1927, with Italianate architecture that sits on a stone foundation.

It was listed on the National Register of Historic Places in the Downtown Huntington Historic District in 1986.

== See also ==
- National Register of Historic Places listings in Cabell County, West Virginia
