= First Presbyterian Church (Huntington, West Virginia) =

- U.S. National Register of Historic Places
- U.S. Historic district – Contributing property
- The First Presbyterian Church in 2015.
- Location: 1015 5th Ave, Huntington, West Virginia
- Coordinates: 38°25′10.02″N 82°26′27.6″W
- Built: 1895
- Architectural style: Gothic Revival
- Part of: Downtown Huntington Historic District
- NRHP reference No.: 86000309
- Added to NRHP: 1986

The First Presbyterian Church is a tall steep one-story, slate roof church in Huntington, West Virginia, United States.

== History ==
It was built in 1895, with Gothic Revival architecture that sits next to the Johnson Memorial Church. This entry also includes a three-story flat-roof school building.

It was listed on the National Register of Historic Places in the Downtown Huntington Historic District in 1986.

== See also ==
- National Register of Historic Places listings in Cabell County, West Virginia
