= Keith-Albee Theatre =

- "The Keith Albee"
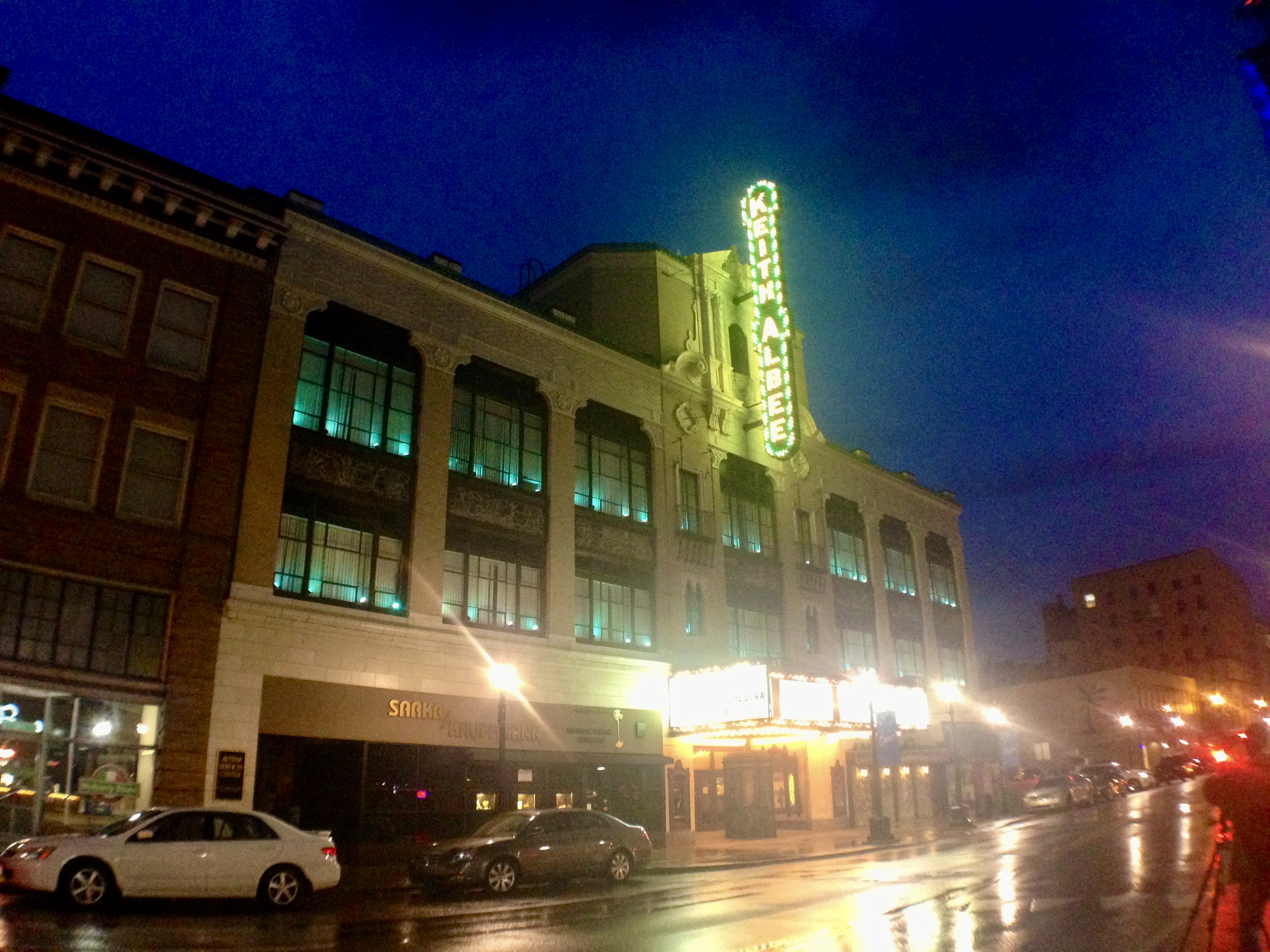
- The Keith-Albee Theatre in 2015
- Interactive map of the Keith-Albee Theatre area

General information
- Type: Performing arts center
- Location: 925 4th Ave, Huntington, West Virginia, US
- Named for: Keith-Albee-Orpheum
- Opened: 1928

Design and construction
- Architect: Thomas W. Lamb

Website
- Official Website
- Keith-Albee Theatre
- U.S. Historic district – Contributing property
- Location within West Virginia
- Coordinates: 38°25′14″N 82°26′34″W
- Part of: Downtown Huntington Historic District (ID86000309)
- Designated CP: February 24, 1986

The Keith-Albee Theatre is a performing arts center, located across the street from the Frederick Building in downtown Huntington, West Virginia, United States.

== History ==
At the time of its construction, the Keith Albee Theatre, named after Keith-Albee-Orpheum, was thought to be the second largest theater in the United States. The theater, built by brothers Abe B. and Sol J. Hyman from Huntington, opened to the public on May 7, 1928.

The new theater was built under the guidance of vaudeville moguls B. F. Keith and Edward Albee and soon became a key venue in their esteemed Keith-Albee circuit, a premier vaudeville tour along the East Coast of the United States. The Keith-Albee Theatre was designed by the renowned Scottish-born architect Thomas W. Lamb, who created approximately 150 theaters around the globe.

Seating approximately 3,000 patrons, the Keith-Albee exemplified the opulence and grandeur of the 1920s with a New Spanish Baroque style. Intricate plasterwork, chandeliers, and balconies created an atmosphere of sophistication, along with cosmetic rooms, smoking rooms, and fireplaces in men’s and women’s restrooms adjoining the main lobby.

The Keith-Albee cost $2 million USD to construct in 1928 and was dubbed a “temple of amusement” by the Herald-Dispatch. The opening day performance on May 8, 1928, featured performer Rae Samuels, nicknamed the “Blue Streak of Vaudeville.”

The Keith-Albee was originally equipped with a Wurlitzer organ to accompany live performances and motion pictures. The organ was said to be capable of creating almost any sound effect needed for the silent films shown in the theater. The organ was removed and sold in the 1950s after live musical accompaniment lost some appeal. Following an effort by Huntington native Robert Edmunds and his Huntington Theatre Organ Project, a 1927 Wurlitzer organ was purchased and reinstalled in the Keith-Albee in 2001.

In the 1960s and 1970s, the Keith-Albee and the Hyman family began to feel the impact of competition from the growing television and motion picture industries. With significant competition from surround-sound multiplexes, the Hymans divided Keith-Albee's main auditorium into three movie theaters. Two smaller theaters were constructed in the east and west sections of the main auditorium. A fourth theater was later added in a street-facing retail space and has since become a screening room.

In celebration of its 50th anniversary in 1978, the Keith-Albee featured a recreation of a vaudeville show starring singer Rudy Vallee. Ten years later in 1988, the theater hosted a pre-opening screening of the movie Rain Man. Star Dustin Hoffman, Barry Levinson and Mark Johnson attended the event.

On December 12, 2006, the Keith-Albee hosted the premiere of the feature film We Are Marshall, with actors Matthew McConaughey and Matthew Fox, plus director Joseph McGinty Nichol attending. The theatre appears in the movie. Later that year in 2006, the Keith-Albee ended its run as a functioning movie theater and, after almost 80 years of ownership, the Hyman family donated it to the Marshall University Foundation, which in turn passed it over to the newly formed Keith-Albee Performing Arts Center Foundation (KAPAC).

== See also ==
- Cityscape of Huntington, West Virginia
