= Frederick Building =

- U.S. National Register of Historic Places
- The Frederick Building in 2015.
- Location: 940 4th Ave, Huntington, West Virginia 25701
- Coordinates: 38°25′15.492″N 82°26′35.532″W
- Built: 1906
- Architect: James B. Stewart; Edwin N. Alger
- Architectural style: Renaissance Revival
- Part of: Downtown Huntington Historic District
- NRHP reference No.: 86000309
- Added to NRHP: 1986

The Frederick Building, also known as the Frederick Hotel, is a six-story historic commercial building across the street from the Keith-Albee Theatre. It was built in 1906, in a Renaissance Revival-inspired design by James B. Stewart and Edwin N. Alger.

The Frederick Building was listed on the National Register of Historic Places in the Downtown Huntington Historic District in 1986.

== See also ==
- National Register of Historic Places listings in Cabell County, West Virginia
