= West Virginia Hot Dog Festival =

Hot Dog Festival in Huntington, West Virginia, U.S.

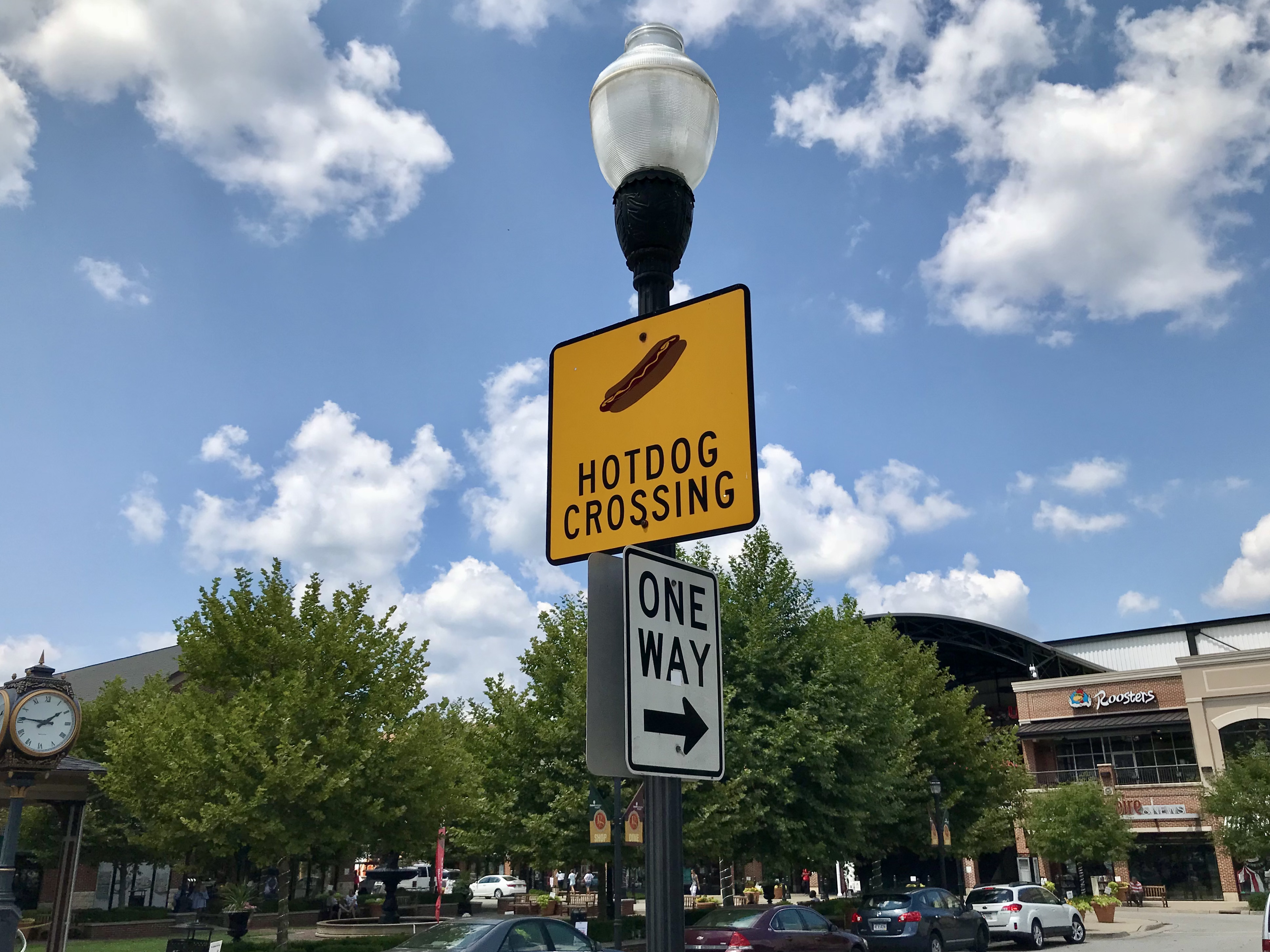
- "Hot Dog Crossing" sign in Pullman Square, in 2018.
- Date: Last Saturday of July
- Venue: Pullman Square
- Location: Huntington, West Virginia; 38°25′20″N 82°26′36″W
- Type: Hot Dog Festival
- Theme: Hot Dog
- Cause: Hoops Family Children’s Hospital
- Participants: 12,000 (2024)
- Website: Official website

The West Virginia Hot Dog Festival is an annual hot dog festival to celebrate the unique variations of local/regional hot dogs, held in Huntington, West Virginia.

== History ==
The first West Virginia Hot Dog Festival was held on July 30, 2005. This first event, founded by John Mandt Jr owner of Stewarts Original Hot Dogs, brought in $8,000 for the Hoops Family Children's Hospital. As of 2024, the festival has raised over $250,000 for its cause.

=== The West Virginia Hot Dog ===
The West Virginia Hot Dog consists of chili sauce, made from ground beef, tomatoes and peppers, chopped onion, coleslaw and yellow mustard.

== Events ==
The West Virginia Hot Dog Festival hosts an array of events including:

- Car shows
- Dog costume contest
- Hot Dog sauce/chili contest
- Hot Dog eating competition
- Root Beer drinking competition
- Weiner dog races

== See also ==
- Hot Dog Day
- Hot dog variations
