= Jim's Steak and Spaghetti House =

Restaurant in Huntington, West Virginia, US

- Jim's Steak and Spaghetti House in 2015.
- Interactive map of Jim's Steak and Spaghetti House

Restaurant information
- Established: 1938
- Owners: Vicki Dunn Dionne, Carissa and Corey Cavin
- Previous owner: Jim Tweel (Founder)
- Location: 920 5th Ave, Huntington, West Virginia 25701, US
- Coordinates: 38°25′11″N 82°26′34″W
- Website: Official website

Jim's Steak and Spaghetti House is a restaurant located in the Central Huntington Garage in Huntington, West Virginia, United States. In 2019, the business was named one of "America's Classics" by the James Beard Foundation Awards.

== History ==
In 1939, Jim Tweel founded Jim's Steak and Spaghetti House at the age of 19. Following is a list of documented notable customers:

- Muhammad Ali
- Jeff Bezos
- George W. Bush
- Shelley Moore Capito
- Bill Clinton
- John F. Kennedy
- Moses Kingsley
- Billy Joel
- Naomi Judd
- Wynonna Judd
- Jack Lengyel
- Joe Manchin
- Landau Eugene Murphy Jr.
- Andrew Wiggins

== See also ==
- List of James Beard America's Classics
