= Fifth Avenue Baptist Church =

- U.S. National Register of Historic Places
- The Fifth Avenue Baptist Church in 2015.
- Location: 1135 5th Ave, Huntington, West Virginia 25701
- Coordinates: 38°25′11.46″N 82°26′19.5″W
- Built: 1916
- Architectural style: Classical Revival
- Part of: Downtown Huntington Historic District
- NRHP reference No.: 86000309
- Added to NRHP: 1986

The Fifth Avenue Baptist Church is a tall, two-story, end gable church. It was designed by R.H. Hunt and built in 1916 in the Classical Revival architectural style. Its location is near Trinity Episcopal Church.

It was listed on the National Register of Historic Places in the Downtown Huntington Historic District in 1986.

== See also ==
- National Register of Historic Places listings in Cabell County, West Virginia
