= Huntington Arcade =

- The Huntington Arcade in 2015

General information
- Type: Arcade
- Location: 900 4th Ave, Huntington, West Virginia, United States

The Huntington Arcade is a historic shopping arcade located in Huntington, West Virginia, United States. The building is part of the Downtown Huntington Historic District.

== History ==
In 1925 the Huntington Arcade, originally called the Ritter Arcade, opened to the public as a shopping mall in the growing downtown of Huntington, West Virginia.

In the 1980s downtown Huntington struggled with the competition of the newly constructed Huntington Mall, which resulted in the vacancy of most tenants within the Huntington Arcade. Years later, developer Dennis Johnson purchased the arcade and invested $2.5 million into turning it into a condominium complex, which opened in 2014.

== See also ==
- Cityscape of Huntington, West Virginia
- Downtown Huntington Historic District
