= Trinity Episcopal Church (Huntington, West Virginia) =

- U.S. National Register of Historic Places
- The Trinity Episcopal Church in 2015.

- Location within West Virginia Location within the United States
- Location: 520 11th St, Huntington, West Virginia 25701
- Coordinates: 38°25′10.884″N 82°26′22.92″W
- Built: 1882
- Architectural style: Gothic Revival
- Part of: Downtown Huntington Historic District
- NRHP reference No.: 86000309
- Added to NRHP: 1986

The Trinity Episcopal Church is a tall steep one-story, slate roof church. It was built in 1882, with Gothic Revival architecture that sits on a stone foundation. This entry also includes a three-story gable parish house. It was listed on the National Register of Historic Places in the Downtown Huntington Historic District in 1986.

The congregation is part of the Episcopal Diocese of West Virginia. In 2016, the church reported 377 members; in 2023, it reported 265 members. No membership statistics were reported in 2024 national parochial reports. Plate and pledge financial support reported by the church in 2024 was $211,658. Average Sunday Attendance (ASA) reported in 2024 was 69 persons. This was a relative decrease from ASA of 120 reported in 2015.

The church's rector is the Venerable David Johnston, also Archdeacon for Young Adult and Campus Ministry for the Episcopal Diocese of West Virginia.

== See also ==
- National Register of Historic Places listings in Cabell County, West Virginia
