= John Laidley =

American lawyer

John Laidley (1791–1863) was a Virginia lawyer and politician.

== Career ==
Laidley was born in Morgantown, Virginia and at age twenty-one served as a militia Colonel in the War of 1812. His family was of Scottish and English descent.

As an adult, Laidley made his home in Cabell County, serving as a prosecuting attorney until his death. In 1829, he was elected to the Virginia Constitutional Convention of 1829-1830, and appointed to the Committee of the Judicial Department. He was one of four delegates elected from the western Senatorial district of Kanawha, Mason, Cabell, Randolph, Harrison, Lewis, Wood, and Logan Counties.

=== Marshall University ===
In 1837, he was one of the founders of Marshall University in present Huntington, West Virginia.

Laidley Hall, a former residence hall at Marshall University, was named after Laidley.

== Bibliography ==
- Pulliam, David Loyd (1901). The Constitutional Conventions of Virginia from the foundation of the Commonwealth to the present time. John T. West, Richmond. ISBN 978-1-2879-2059-5.
