= Marshall University Rural Health Clinic =

Medical school in West Virginia, U.S.

The Marshall University Rural Health Clinic, also called the MU Rural Health Center, is a division of the Joan C. Edwards School of Medicine of Marshall University that opened in May 2012. It is located in Chapmanville, West Virginia.

The purpose of the medical school is to alleviate the shortage of physicians in rural central and southern Appalachia. The center provides rural health clinical rotations, and brings university-quality health care to the rural area.
