= Marquee Cinemas =

American chain of movie theaters

Marquee Cinemas Inc.
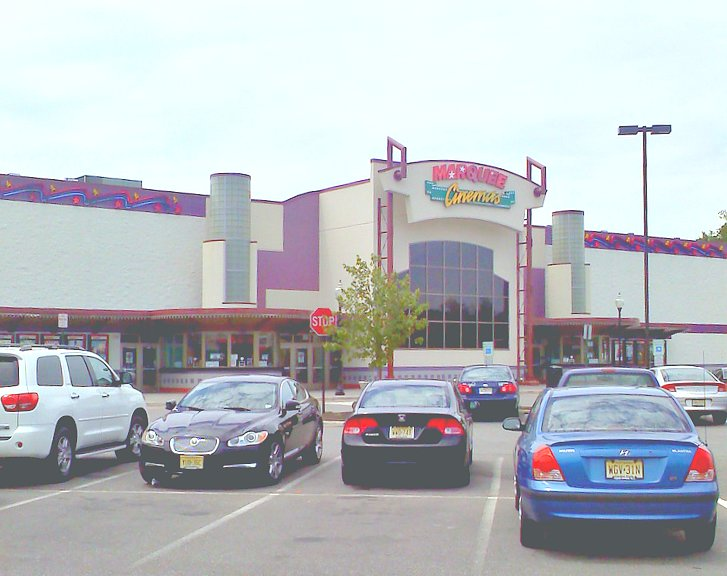
- Marquee Cinemas in Toms River, New Jersey
- Type: Private
- Industry: Movie theaters
- Founded: 1979 in Rainelle, West Virginia
- Founder: Curtis E. McCall
- Headquarters: Beckley, West Virginia
- Number of locations: 11 (8 states)
- Key people: Cindy Ramsden (CFO)
- Website: www.marqueecinemas.com

Marquee Cinemas is an American chain of movie theaters. It operates in the Eastern United States.

Founder Curtis McCall opened his first movie theatre in Rainelle, West Virginia, in June 1979. By June 2007, he had expanded the business to 18 multiplexes with 166 screens across eight states.

As of September 7, 2026, it had 15 locations and 167 screens in 8 states.

== Locations ==
- Cape Coral, Florida
- Toms River, New Jersey
- New Hartford, New York
- Morganton, North Carolina
- Raleigh, North Carolina
- Bristol, Tennessee
- Wytheville, Virginia
- Beckley, West Virginia
- South Charleston, West Virginia
- Summersville, West Virginia
- Wheeling, West Virginia

=== Former locations ===
- Glasgow, Kentucky — Permanently Closed on September 7, 2026
- Fredericksburg, Virginia – Permanently closed on June 30, 2024
- Huntington, West Virginia - Permanently closed on September 18, 2026
