= Pullman Square =

Shopping center in Huntington, West Virginia, United States

Coordinates: 38°25′20″N 82°26′36″W

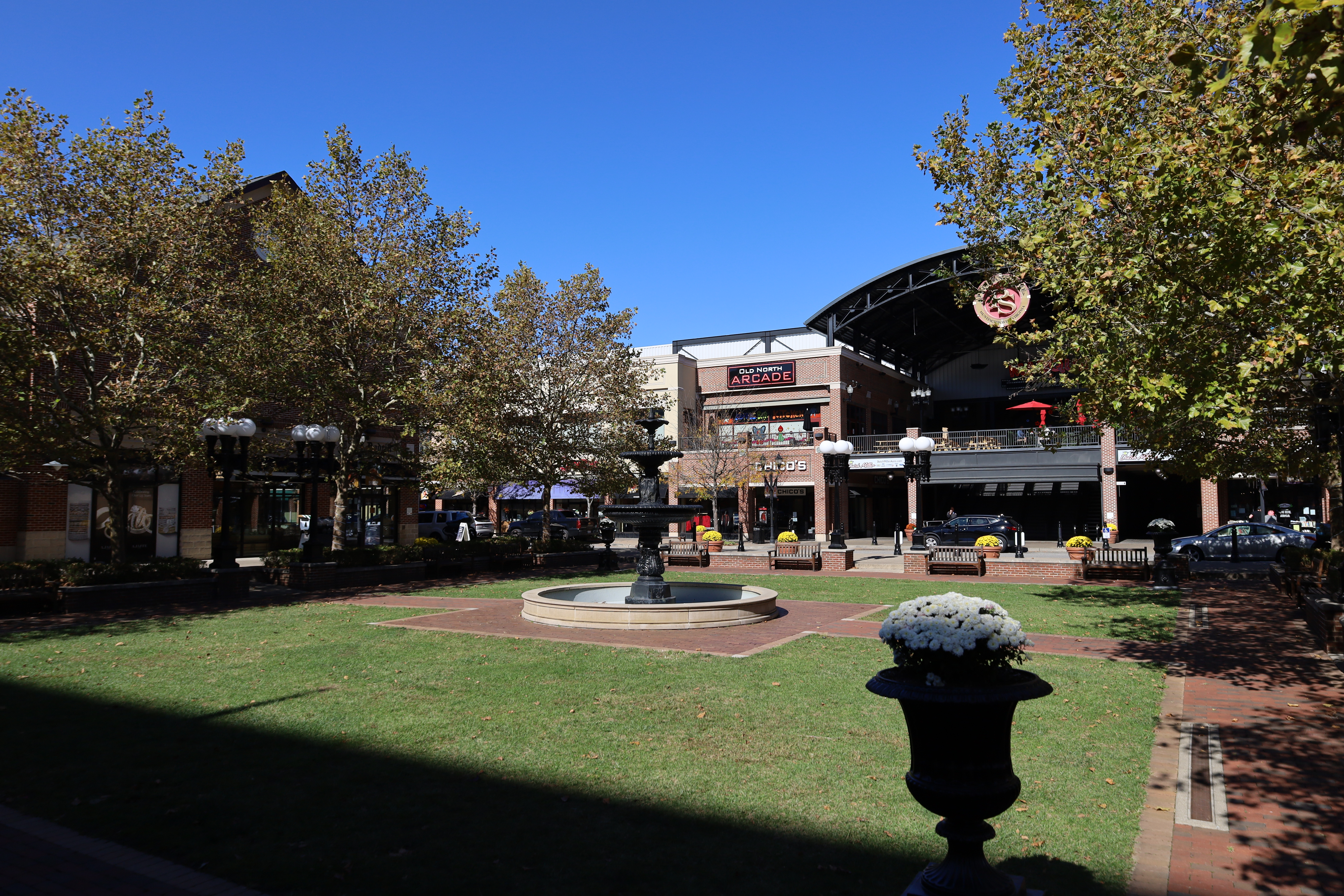
- The square in 2023
- Location: Huntington, West Virginia, United States
- Address: 220 9th Street
- Opened: 2004
- Developer: Metropolitan Partners
- Owner: Metropolitan Partners
- Num. of stores: 20+
- Floor area: 200,000 square feet (19,000 m^{2})
- Website: https://pullman-square.com/

Pullman Square is a lifestyle center in downtown Huntington, West Virginia, United States between 8th and 10th Street and 3rd Avenue and Veteran's Memorial Boulevard. It is located on what was known as the Superblock, a large urban renewal project that saw the demolishing of four city-square-blocks in 1970. The center opened in 2004, featuring approximately 20 stores, along with office space, restaurants, and a movie theater. It was developed by Metropolitan Partners.

== History ==
=== Superblock ===
The Superblock was to be a large revitalization project in downtown Huntington. In 1970, a four-block 9-acre (36,000 m^{2}) vacant site was created for the next "large development"; however, problems besieged the area for decades. In 1974, a master plan was developed for the vacant site.

In 1977, the Huntington Civic Arena was constructed on one parcel. One year later, a group of entrepreneurs wanted to construct a 350-room hotel and retail stores; however, the plan died by 1980. In 1983, the National Shamrock Development and Investment Company wanted to develop the property and took a two-year lease on the project. By mid-1985, however, the lease ran out and the developers could not receive financial backing due to the failure in their $15 million Urban Development Action Grant request.

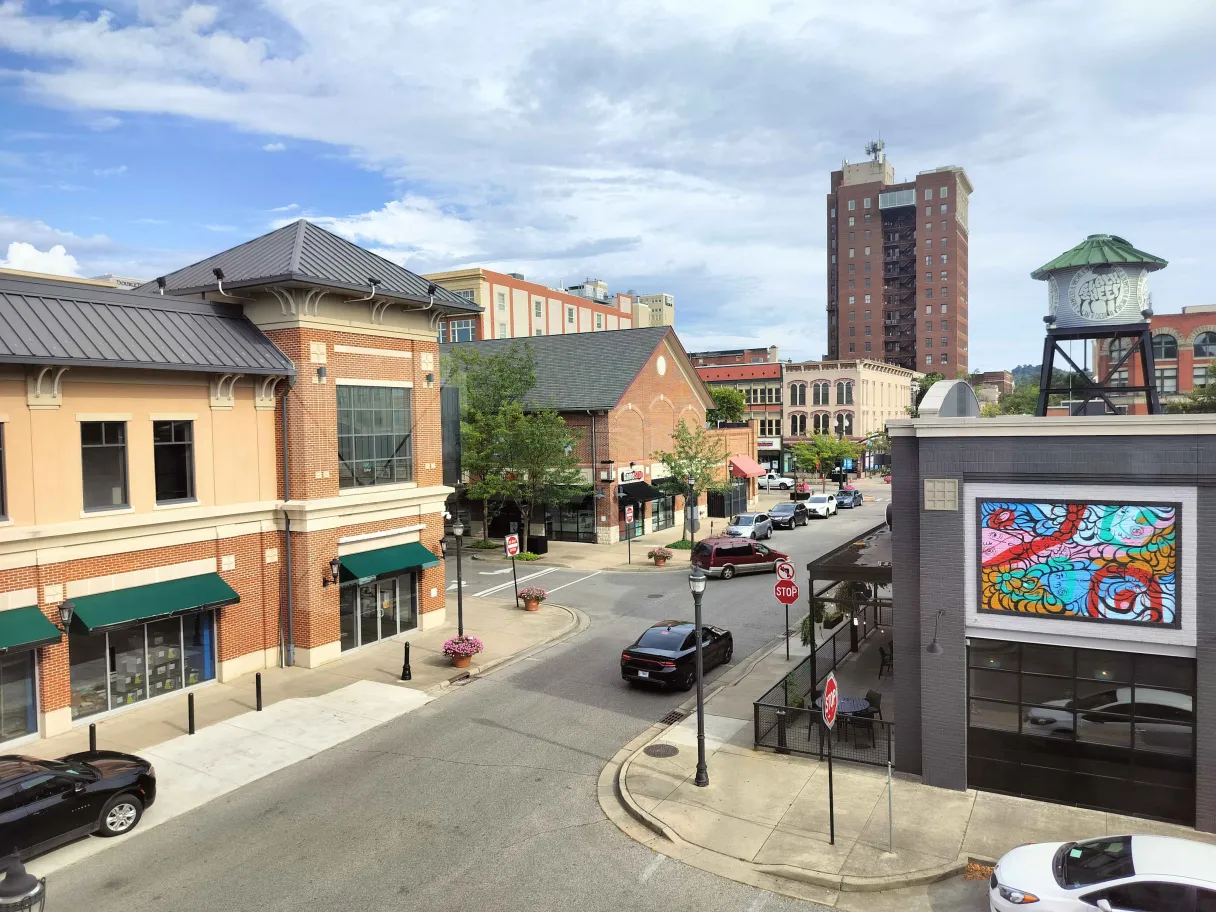
Skyway view of Pullman Square in 2024.

In the spring of 1986, the Huntington Development Corporation suggested that an off-track betting facility be constructed; however, the idea died after Governor Arch Moore vetoed an off-track betting bill that was critical to the project's success. In 1987, the Webb Companies presented a plan for a $110 million mixed-use complex called RiverCenter that would feature a 20-story office tower, an underground parking garage and a skyway to the Harris Riverfront Park. The project failed when two large tenants could not be found to anchor the project. In 1988, the city's grant to help develop the project was revoked.

Another instance included an outlet mall proposal that was announced on May 6, 1987; however, two months later, the Herald-Dispatch reported that the project was "dead" and that the "13-year history of failure haunts (the) Superblock." Another proposal, on April 28, 1989 reported on a development that was "on tap," followed by an article several years later that stated, "super development dream fails to become reality." In 1992, a two-story shopping center was proposed but the idea failed to receive tenant support.

A Chi-Chi's Mexican restaurant was constructed on the corner of 3rd Avenue and 10th Street in 1991. These developments were mostly suburban in nature and was not conductive to improvements in downtown Huntington. A Holiday Inn was constructed adjacent to the Big Sandy Superstore Arena between 8th and 9th Street in 1998.

=== Intermodal facility ===
In 1998, $27 million for an intermodal facility was appropriated from Congress; an additional $6.7 million came from state and local funding. Then Governor Cecil Underwood had promised $700,000 in 1999, with local lawmakers funding the additional $1.3 million; an additional $4 million was to be allocated from the state over the next two years.

The proposed facility was for a Tri-State Transit Authority (TTA) bus transfer station, retail development and associated parking structures and would occupy a two-block surface parking lot between 8th Street and 10th Street along 3rd Avenue. A later study by Woolpert suggested at least 150,000 sq ft (14,000 m^{2}) of retail and a parking structure that has 800 to 1,400 spaces. Yet another study suggested that retail, entertainment, dining, housing, cultural, and educational aspects be included in the project. A ground breaking ceremony was planned in early 2000 with initial completion of the project in 2001.

In order to complete the Superblock, Chi-Chi's would need to be evicted; however, it was granted an opportunity to have a restaurant within the proposed development. Chi-Chi's refused to leave the Superblock, however, citing that they wanted to "upgrade and remodel" the restaurant.

In 1999, Robert C. Byrd allocated $8 million to federal appropriation bills for the Superblock project. Another $400,000 was allocated from the Federal Transit Administration to the Huntington Transit Authority for the feasibility study and master plan for the intermodal facility.

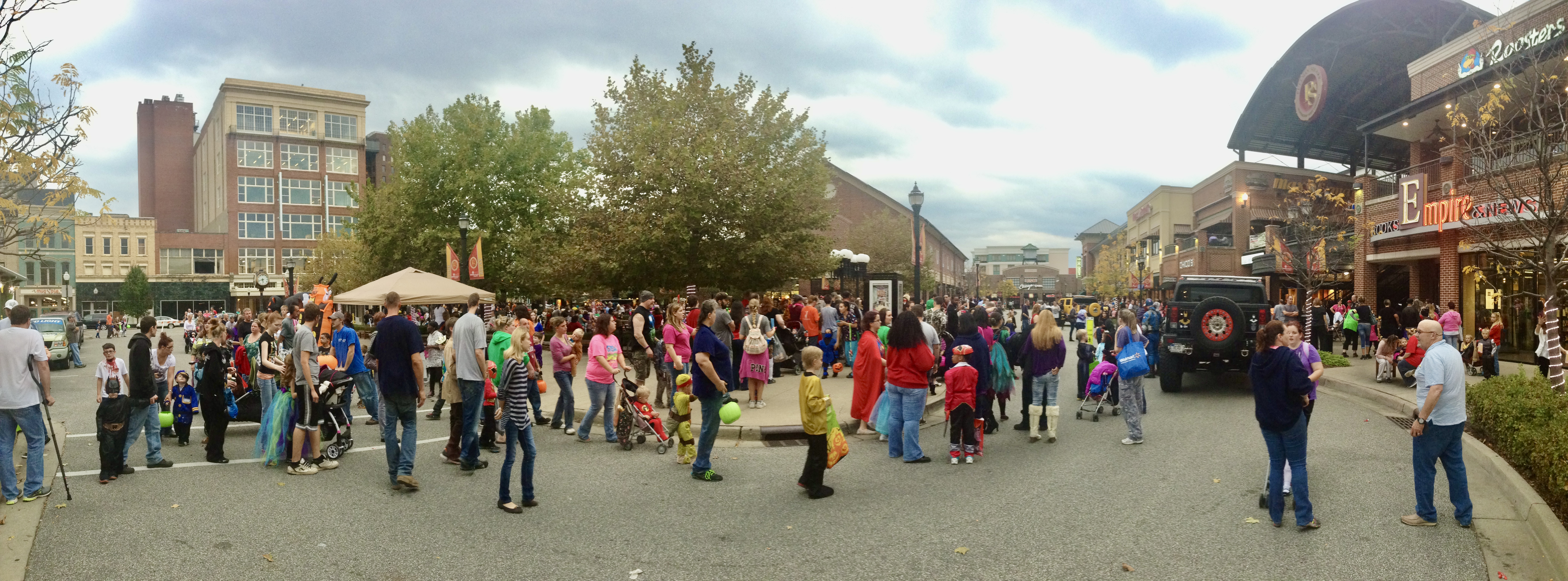
Pullman Square in 2014

=== Pullman Square ===
On September 30, 1999, it was announced that the Huntington Urban Renewal Authority was in negotiations with the Transit Authority and an unnamed Columbus, Ohio developer for the Superblock. In early October, President Bill Clinton signed the Transportation Appropriations bill, which provided an additional $12 million in funds for the intermodal facility.

On October 18, 2000, Steiner + Associates (dropped in favor of Metropolitan Partners with the same developers), a Columbus, Ohio developer that specializes in recreating downtown urban environments, announced a $60 million 200,000 sq ft (20,000 m^{2}). retail and entertainment complex between 10th streets and 3rd Avenue and Veterans Memorial Boulevard that would resemble an "old-time small town" and would fit within the "historic context of the existing downtown." The developers had previously constructed similar developments in Newport, Kentucky with the completion of Newport on the Levee and Easton Town Center in Columbus. The project would include stores, restaurants and a 12 to 16-screen movie theater and would open in fall of 2002. Two parking structures would be constructed as well. The parking structure between 8th and 9th Street would be four-levels and include 940 parking spaces, but could be expanded upward to include an office tower; the parking structure between 9th and 10th Streets would be three-levels and include the movie complex on top. Broken down, the project plan included,

- 65,000 sq ft (6,000 m^{2}) of retail,
- 30,000 sq ft (3,000 m^{2}) of restaurants,
- 25,300 sq, ft. of office space,
- 25,000 sq ft (2,300 m^{2}) of entertainment, and
- a 2,300-seat, 50,000 sq ft (5,000 m^{2}) theater.

The plan included narrowing 3rd Avenue from four-lanes westbound towards the Robert C. Byrd Bridge to one lane in each direction with angled parking; however, this was later revised to one-lane in each direction with parallel parking and a center variable lane. The road narrowing plan was envisioned as a traffic calming measure.

In January 2002, the Huntington Urban Renewal Authority began eminent domain proceedings against Chi-Chi's. The parent company of Chi-Chi's, Prandium Inc., had refused to sell the property and rejected the city's final offer on October 19, 2000 and refused all negotiations and communications with the Authority and with Metropolitan Partners. In March, Prandium Inc. refused an offer of $975,000 for the property plus $200,000 in relocation costs, which was over the appraised value of the property. The company requested a sale price of $2 million instead. The company, however, went into Chapter 11 bankruptcy reorganization in March. In May, Chi-Chi's wanted to sell the property for $1.15 million, including undisclosed costs for relocation and loss of business, but later reversed out of the deal and wanted $1.75 million.

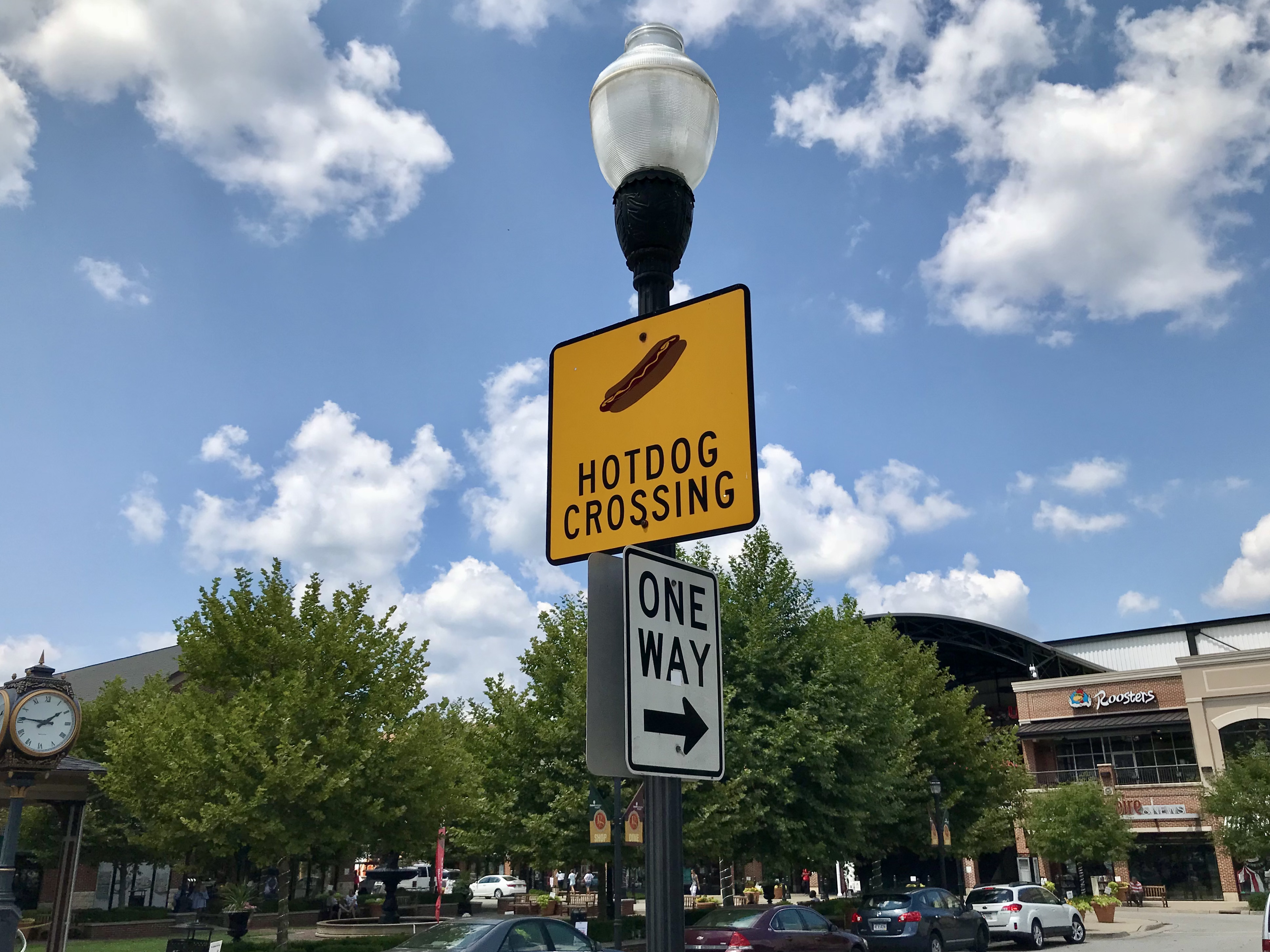
Pullman Square is home to the annual West Virginia Hot Dog Festival.

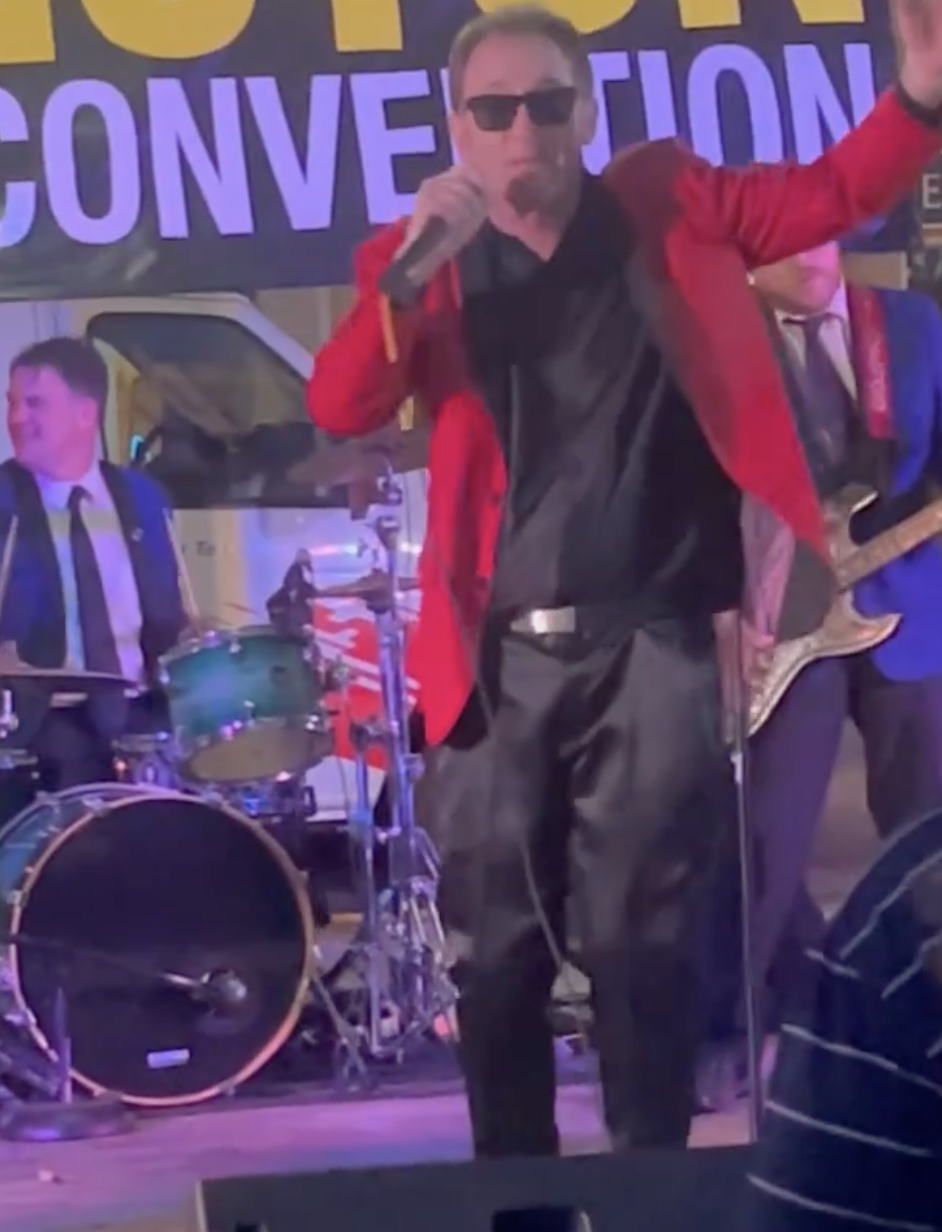
Tom Kenny performing at Pullman Square in August 2023.

During November 2002, Metropolitan Partners filed a grant request to the West Virginia Economic Development Grant Committee. It received $10.6 million in infrastructure improvements. A lawsuit was later filed by the Jackson County, West Virginia lawyer Larry Harless, questioning the legality of the committee and its work. Eventually, the Supreme Court of Appeals of West Virginia nullified the grant process and the grants that were given.

On March 26, 2003, the Superblock was sold to the developers of Pullman Square, Metropolitan Partners. Chi-Chi's had until April 15 to vacate; it was demolished on the 29th. The opening date had been pushed back from spring to summer 2004 due to a court case that was being considered by the West Virginia Supreme Court. In July 2003, the West Virginia Legislature passed legislation that withstood the Court of Appeals; however, the Pullman Square project had to be re-approved by the reconstituted grant committee. The grant money was once again awarded in August; however, two citizens' lawsuits by Larry Harless once again disputed the process. In their case, they stated that the state may provide loans to the projects but not to the grants, and questioned the legality of the state's video lottery. The West Virginia Economic Development Grant Committee was to finance the grants by selling bonds which would be repaid from profits on video lottery.

On October 17, 2003, the state Supreme Court ruled that the state could proceed with the sale of bonds financing Pullman Square and 48 other projects throughout the state.

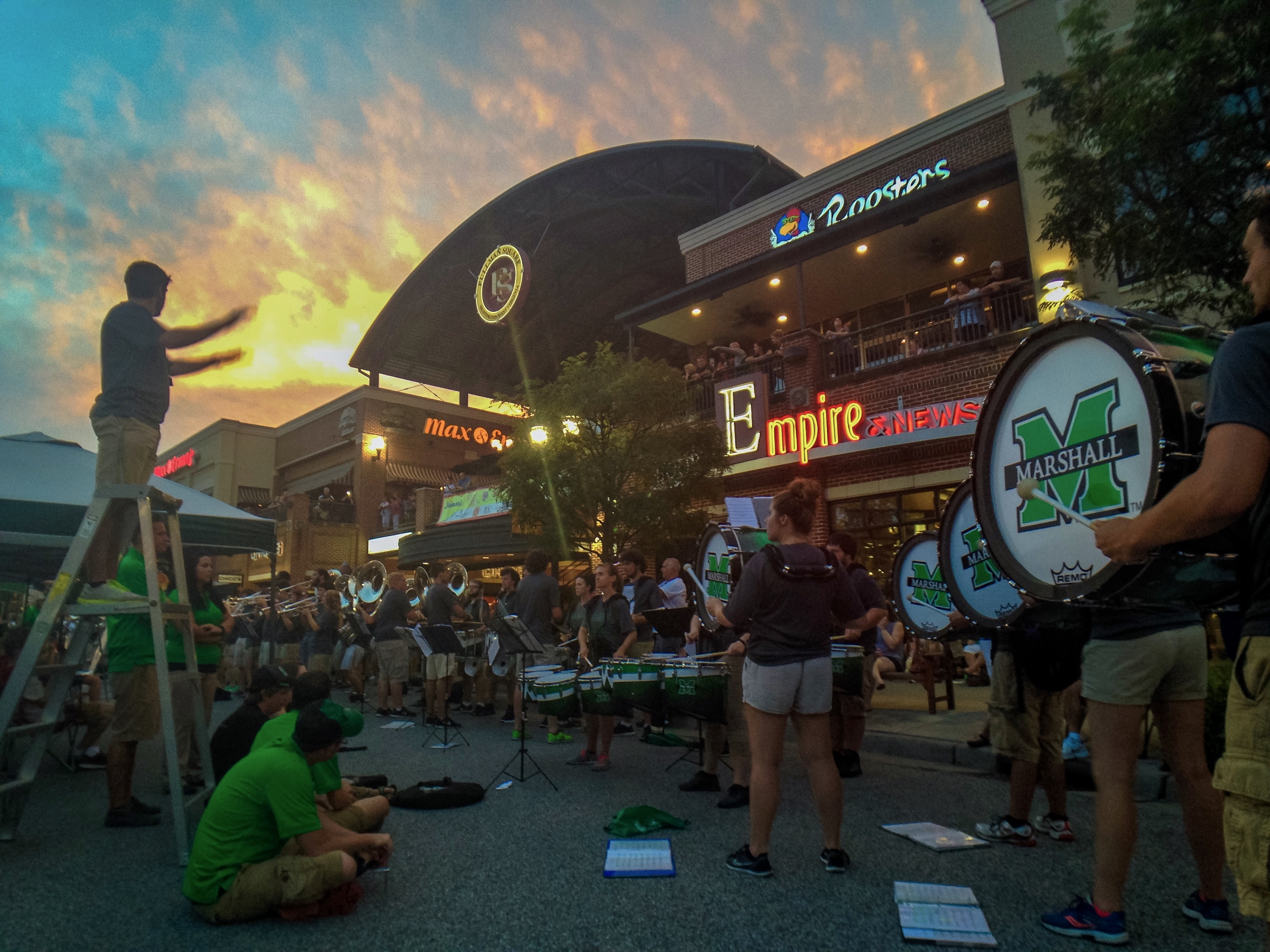
Marshall University pep rally at Pullman Square in 2016.

=== Construction and opening ===
Construction began on Pullman Square on July 16, 2004 with the excavation of the parking lot for the parking structures. It opened on November 19, 2004 with Marquee Cinemas. Others, such as Empire Books & News, EB Games and Starbucks, opened in early December. In June 2005, the Funny Bone Comedy Club opened, followed by Cold Stone Creamery in July and pizzeria Uno Chicago Grill and Max & Erma's in August.

A few months after opening, the Uno Chicago Grill was sued for not paying the builders, suppliers, and utilities. It soon changed its name to La Sha's West Virginia Bistro and was headed by Powerball winner Jack Whittaker; however, it closed on February 22, 2007 after another lawsuit was filed after Metropolitan Huntington LLC complained that the Bistro owed thousands for rent.

Edible Arrangements was announced on August 5, 2006. The retail store, specializing in fruit bouquets and designer arrangements of fruit, opened in the fall. A few months later, on January 11, 2007, Moe's Southwest Grill closed for remodeling. The quick-casual restaurant later reluctantly announced that it was, in fact, moving to a nearby location on 9th Street. On March 17 Runway Couture opened next to Inspired, featuring west coast-inspired fashions; both are owned by Deneene Chafin. Moe's Southwest Grill maintained good faith talks with Pullman Square and after protracted negotiations Metropolitan Partners agreed to Moe's corporate lease arrangements and subsequently surrendered the keys to the former location on November 5, 2007.

On May 8, 2008, it was announced that Community Trust Bank would locate a bank branch at the corner of 3rd Avenue and 10th Street. It would include spaces for more retail that is currently "under negotiations". Construction began in August. The Garage Chophouse, however, pulled out of Pullman Square. In June, it was announced that Uno Chicago Grill would reopen under the franchise of Rick Rose, who owns some Bennigan's restaurants in Ohio, and under Mike Bartrum, a retired NFL player. The restaurant sells Chicago-style pizza and could open by July 30. Benny's Cheesesteaks opened on June 19, the second location for the Columbus, Ohio-based restaurant that sells Philadelphia-style hoagies, wings, wraps, and beer. Heels, a high-end shoe store owned by the owner of Inspired and Runway Couture made its debut in July.

In October 2018, Max & Erma's closed its doors abruptly. Many employees claimed they were not informed by management that the location was closing. A few months later in March 2019, Quicksilver Arcade and Bar announced that they will open in the former Max and Erma's space.

== See also ==
- Cityscape of Huntington, West Virginia
