= Marshall University Forensic Science Center =

Coordinates: 38°24′42.9″N 82°25′51.5″W

- "The FSC"
- Interactive map of the Marshall University Forensic Science Center area

General information
- Type: Forensic Lab
- Location: 1401 Forensic Science Dr, Huntington, WV 25701, Huntington, West Virginia, USA
- Affiliation: Marshall University

Website
- Official Website

The Marshall University Forensic Science Center, located in Huntington, West Virginia, houses a two-year graduate program in forensic science and the state of West Virginia's Combined DNA Index System (CODIS) laboratory facility.
