= List of restaurants in Huntington, West Virginia =

Jim's Steak and Spaghetti House

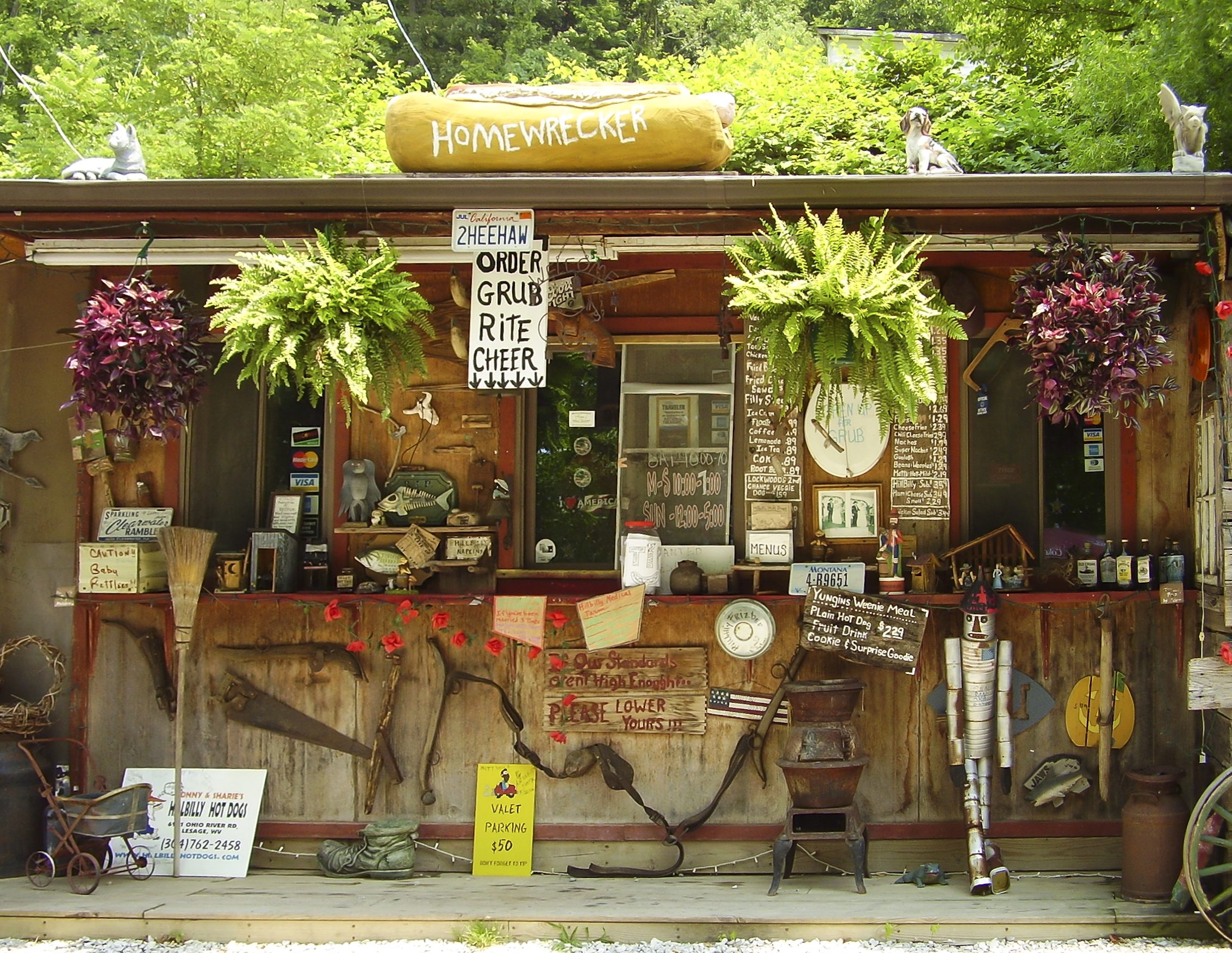
Hillbilly Hot Dogs

Following is a list of notable restaurants in Huntington, West Virginia and its surrounding areas:

== List of restaurants ==
=== Huntington ===
- 21 at the Frederick
- Austin's Homemade Ice Cream
- Cam's Ham
- Central City Cafe
- Gino's Pizza and Spaghetti (Founded in Huntington)
- Nomada Bakery
- Jim's Steak and Spaghetti House

==== Defunct ====
- The Old Library
- Elephant Walk

=== Huntington–Ashland metropolitan area ===
- Hillbilly Hot Dogs

== See also ==
- Huntington, West Virginia Culture
