= Geno =

Geno may refer to:

== People ==
- Geno (given name), including a list of people with the name
- Marián Geňo (born 1984), Czech footballer
- Evgeni Malkin (born 1986), Russian ice hockey player nicknamed Geno

== Art and entertainment ==
- "Geno" (song), a 1980 song by Dexys Midnight Runners
- Geno (album), a compilation album by Dexys Midnight Runners
- Geno (Super Mario RPG), a fictional character in Super Mario RPG
- Geno Studio, a Japanese animation studio
- Geno, a fictional character in Fortnite Battle Royale

== Other uses ==
- Geno Biosphere Reserve, Iran

== See also ==
- Genos (disambiguation)
- Gino (disambiguation)
- Gino's (disambiguation)
