= Gino (given name) =

- Gender: Male
- Language: Italian

Origin
- Meaning: ever-living

Other names
- Variant forms: Geno, Jeno, Jino
- Derived: Eugenio, or names ending in "gino" such as Ambrogino, Luigino, and Giorgino

Gino is a name of Italian origin. It may also be the short form of other Italian names like Ambrogino or Luigino or Eugenio, which are from the Ancient Greek name Ambrosios (ἀμβρόσιος), which means "ever-living", and/or Eugenios (εὐγένιος), which means "well-born, noble". It may occasionally be a nickname.

Notable people with the name include:

== People ==
- Gino (singer) (1940–1992), Greek popular singer active in the 1960s and 1970s
- Gino Agnese (1936–2026), Italian journalist, biographer and essayist
- Gino Alache (born 1973), Peruvian music journalist and producer
- Gino Albertengo (born 2003), Argentine footballer
- Gino Alucema (born 1992), Chilean footballer
- Gino Antonio, Filipino actor
- Gino Armano (1927–2003), Italian footballer
- Gino Banks, Indian drummer
- Gino Bartali (1914–2000), Italian cyclist
- Gino Bartolucci (1905–1998), Italian cyclist
- Gino Basso (born 1914), Italian basketball player
- Gino Bechi (1913–1993), Italian opera singer
- Gino Belloni (1884–1924), Italian fencer
- Gino Benigni (1913–1984), Italian architect
- Gino Berretta (born 1942), Italian gridiron football player
- Gino Betts, American attorney and public servant
- Gino Bianco (1916–1984), Brazilian racing driver
- Gino Bibbi (1899–1999), Italian aviator
- Gino Birindelli (1911–2008), Italian politician
- Gino Boccasile (1901–1952), Italian illustrator
- Gino Bona (born 1973), American marketing professional
- Gino Borsoi (born 1974), Italian motorcycle racer
- Gino Bosz (born 1993), Dutch footballer
- Gino Bramieri (1928–1996), Italian comedian and actor
- Gino Brazil (born 1968), Irish former footballer
- Gino Brito (born 1941), Canadian professional wrestler
- Gino Brogdon (born 1962), American judge and TV personality
- Gino Brousseau (born 1966), Canadian volleyball player
- Gino Bucchino (born 1948), Italian politician
- Gino Bulso (born 1961), American politician
- Gino Burrini (1934–2022), Italian alpine skier
- Gino Buzzanca (1912–1985), Italian actor
- Gino Cantarelli (1899–1950), Italian Dadaist poet and painter
- Gino Cappelletti (1934–2022), American Football League Hall-of-Fame player
- Gino Cappello (1920–1990), Italian footballer
- Gino Capponi (1792–1876), Italian historian and politician
- Gino Cavallini (born 1962), Canadian National Hockey League player
- Gino Cavicchioli (born 1957), Australian-born Canadian sculptor
- Gino Cervi (1901–1974), Italian actor
- Gino Cimoli (1929–2011), American Major League Baseball player
- Gino Colaussi (1914–1991), Italian footballer
- Gino Conforti (born 1932), American actor
- Gino Coppedè (1866–1927), Italian architect, sculptor and decorator
- Gino Costa (born 1956), Peruvian politician and former Interior Minister
- Gino Coutinho (born 1982), Dutch football goalkeeper
- Gino D'Acampo (born 1976), Italian celebrity chef, television personality and cookbook writer
- Gino D'Antonio (1927–2006), Italian comics writer and artist
- Gino De Dominicis (1947–1998), Italian artist.
- Gino Fano (1871–1952), Italian mathematician
- Gino Fracas (1930–2009), Canadian college football player and Hall-of-Fame coach
- Gino Gallagher (c. 1963–1996), assassinated Chief of Staff of the Irish National Liberation Army
- Gino Gavioli (1923–2016), Italian comics artist, animator and occasional comic writer
- Gino Vinicio Gentili (1914–2006), Italian archaeologist and mayor
- Gino Giugni (1927–2009), Italian academic and politician, former Minister of Labour and Social Security
- Gino Groover (born 2002), American baseball player
- Gino Hernandez, ring name of American professional wrestler Charles Wolfe Jr. (1957–1986)
- Gino Iorgulescu (born 1956), Romanian former footballer and current chairman of the Romanian Professional Football League
- Gino Lawless (born 1959), Irish footballer
- Gino Leurini (1934–2014), Italian actor
- Gino Levi-Montalcini (1902–1974), Italian architect and designer
- Gino Loria (1862–1954), Italian mathematician and historian of mathematics
- Gino Maes (born 1957), Belgian footballer
- Evgeni Malkin (born 1986), Russian player in the National Hockey League, nicknamed "Gino" or "Geno"
- Gino Marchetti (1927–2019), American National Football League player
- Gino Marinuzzi (1882–1945), Italian conductor and composer
- Gino Matrundola (born 1940), Canadian politician
- Gino J. Merli (1924–2002), American soldier awarded the Medal of Honor
- Gino Munaron (1928–2009), Italian racing driver
- Gino Odjick (born 1970), Canadian National Hockey League player
- Gino Orlando (1929–2003), Brazilian footballer
- Gino Padula (born 1976), Argentine footballer
- Gino Paoli (1934–2026), Italian singer-songwriter
- Gino Parin (1876–1944), Italian painter
- Gino Perente (1937–1995), American communist and labor organizer
- Gino Pernice (1927–1997), Italian actor
- Gino Peruzzi (born 1992), Argentine footballer
- Gino Piserchio (1944–1989), American actor, composer and musician
- Gino Pivatelli (1933–2025), Italian football player and manager
- Gino Polidori (1941–2014), American politician
- Gino Pollini (1903–1991), Italian architect
- Gino Quilico (born 1955), Canadian opera singer
- Gino Rea (born 1989), World Champion Motorcycle Racer.
- Gino Reda (born 1960), English-born Canadian television host
- Gino Romiti (1881–1967), Italian painter
- Gino Rossetti (1904–1992), Italian football manager and player
- Gino Rossi (bobsledder), Italian bobsledder
- Gino Rossi (boxer) (1908–1987), Italian boxer
- Gino Rossi (painter) (1884–1947), Italian painter
- Gino Rovere (1897–1965), Italian racing driver in the 1930s
- Gino Sarrocchi (1870–1950), Italian lawyer and politician
- Gino Segrè (born 1938), Italian-born American physicist and author of books on the history of science
- Gino Severini (1883–1966), Italian painter, a leading member of the Futurist movement
- Gino Sinimberghi (1913–1996), Italian opera singer
- Gino Soccio (born 1955), Canadian disco record producer
- Gino Sovran (1924–2016), Canadian basketball player
- Gino Stacchini (born 1938), Italian footballer
- Gino Strada (1948–2021), Italian war surgeon and founder of the Italian organization Emergency
- Gino Torretta (born 1970), American football quarterback and Heisman Trophy winner
- Gino Vanelli (1896–1969), Italian operatic baritone
- Gino Vannelli (born 1952), Canadian singer-songwriter
- Gino Watkins (1907–1932), British arctic explorer

== Fictional characters ==
- Gino Esposito, on the Australian soap opera Neighbours
- Gino Weinberg, member of the Knights of the Round on the anime Code Geass

== See also ==
- Gino (disambiguation)
- Gino (surname)
