= Geno (given name) =

Geno is a masculine given name, usually of Italian origin. It is occasionally a short form of Eugene and other names. People named Geno include:

- Geno Adamia (1936–1993), Georgian military commander
- Geno Arce (born 1964), bassist
- Geno Atkins (born 1988), American football player
- Geno Auriemma (born 1954), Italian-born American women's basketball coach
- Geno Baroni (1930–1984), American Roman Catholic priest and social activist
- Geno Carlisle (born 1976), American former professional basketball player
- Geno Crandall, American basketball player with Hapoel Be'er Sheva in the Israeli Basketball Premier League
- Geno Delafose (born 1972), American accordionist and singer
- Geno DeMarco, American football coach and player
- Geno DeNobile (1933–1995), Canadian football player
- Geno Dobrevski (born 1970), former Bulgarian footballer
- Geno Espineli (born 1982), baseball relief pitcher
- Geno Ford (born 1974), American basketball coach
- Geno Hayes (1987–2021), American football linebacker
- Geno Jones (born 1992), Bahamian sprinter
- Geno Lenardo, former guitarist for the band Filter
- Geno Lewis (born 1993), Canadian football wide receiver
- Geno Mateev (1903–1966), Bulgarian footballer
- Geno Morosi (1920–2016), serviceman
- Geno Petralli (born 1959), American former professional baseball player
- Geno Petriashvili (born 1994), Georgian heavyweight freestyle wrestler
- Geno Segers (born 1978), American actor
- Geno Silva (1948–2020), American actor
- Geno Smith (born 1990), American football player
- Geno Stone (born 1999), American football player
- Geno Washington (born 1943), American R&B singer
- Geno White (born 1978)

== See also ==
- Geno (disambiguation)
- Gino (disambiguation)
