= Cavicchioli =

Cavicchioli is a surname. Notable people with the surname include:

- Gino Cavicchioli (born 1957), Canadian sculptor
- Marco Cavicchioli (born 1969), Italian politician
