= Gino's =

Gino's may refer to:

- Gino's East, a Chicago-based pizzeria chain
- Gino's Hamburgers, a recently revived fast-food chain originating in Baltimore
- Gino's Pizza and Spaghetti, a pizzeria chain in West Virginia
- Geno's Steaks, a restaurant in Philadelphia
- Frank and Gino's, a restaurant in Eastern Canada
- Papa Gino's, a restaurant chain based in Dedham, Massachusetts, U.S.

== See also ==
- Jeno's Pizza (disambiguation)
- Gino (disambiguation)
