= Cagliari Courthouse =

Judiciary building in Cagliari, Italy

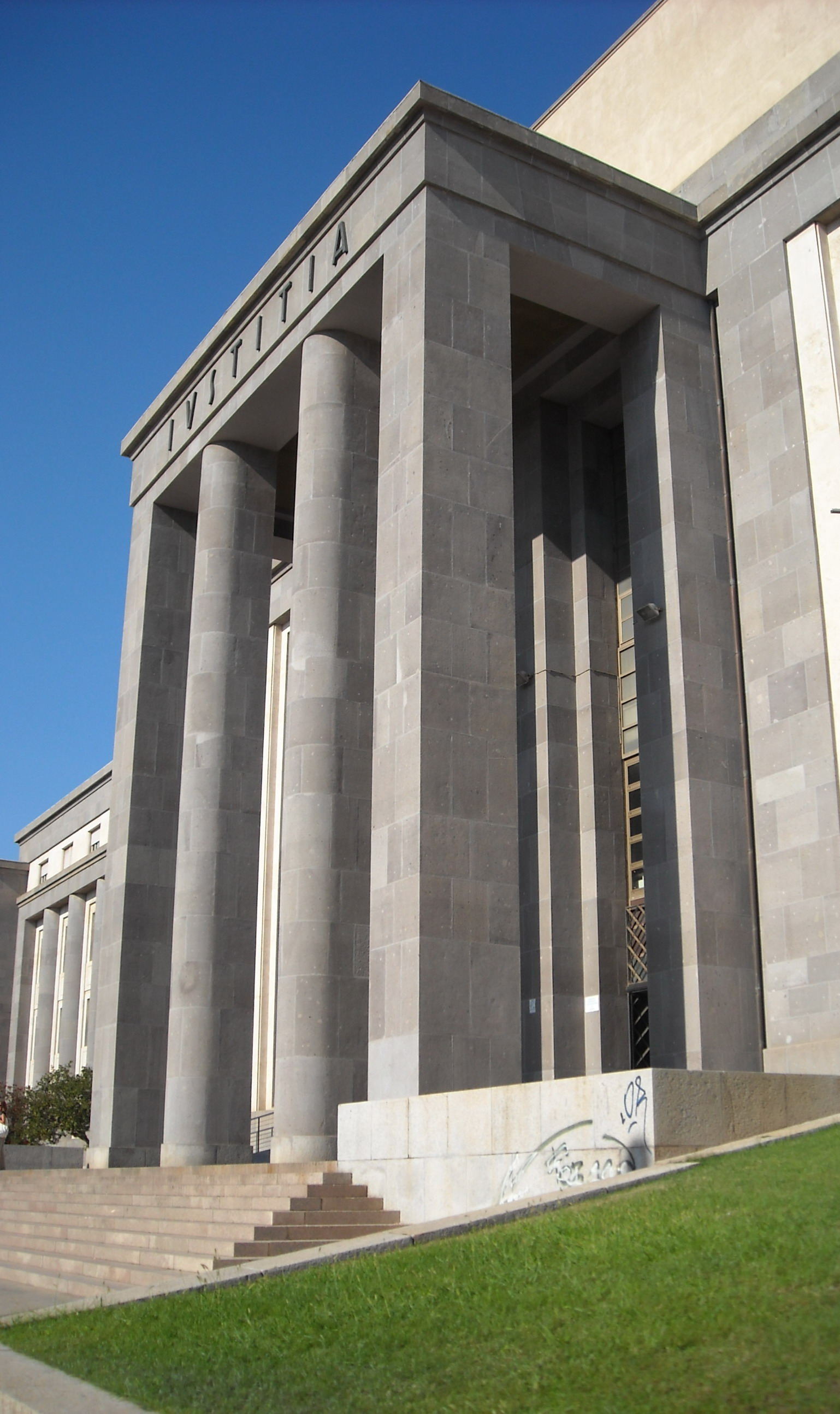
- Interactive map of the Cagliari Courthouse area

General information
- Location: Cagliari, Sardinia, Italy
- Coordinates: 39°12′59″N 9°7′36″E
- Construction started: 1933
- Completed: 1938
- Opening: 1938; 88 years ago

Design and construction
- Architects: Gino Benigni, Domenico Dettori, Augusto Valente

The Cagliari Courthouse (Italian: Palazzo di Giustizia di Cagliari, lit. 'Palace of Justice of Cagliari') is a judicial complex located in Cagliari, Italy.

== History ==
In 1929, the initial plans for constructing a new courthouse were initiated, as the old buildings where the court offices were previously located were deemed no longer suitable. The early selected site was in Viale Trieste, but later, the area of Su Baroni, at the foot of Monte Urpinu, was preferred.

In the 1933 competition, the proposal by engineer Domenico Dettori was chosen. However, the final design also incorporated contributions from architects Gino Benigni, who also designed the courthouse in Sassari, and Augusto Valente, the designer of the INCIS building in Piazza Galilei. The courthouse was officially inaugurated in 1938.

A second wing of the building, facing Via Vidal, was constructed during the 1980s and 1990s.

== Sources ==
- Anna Maria Colavitti; Nicola Usai (2007). Cagliari. Florence: Alinea.
