= Gino (surname) =

Gino is a surname. Notable people with the surname include:

- Alex Gino (born 1977), American children's book writer
- Federico Gino (born 1993), Uruguayan footballer
- Francesca Gino (born 1978), Italian-American behavioral scientist
- Klodian Gino (born 1994), Albanian footballer playing in Greece

== See also ==
- Gino (given name)
- Gino (disambiguation)
