= Tudor's Biscuit World =

U.S. restaurant chain

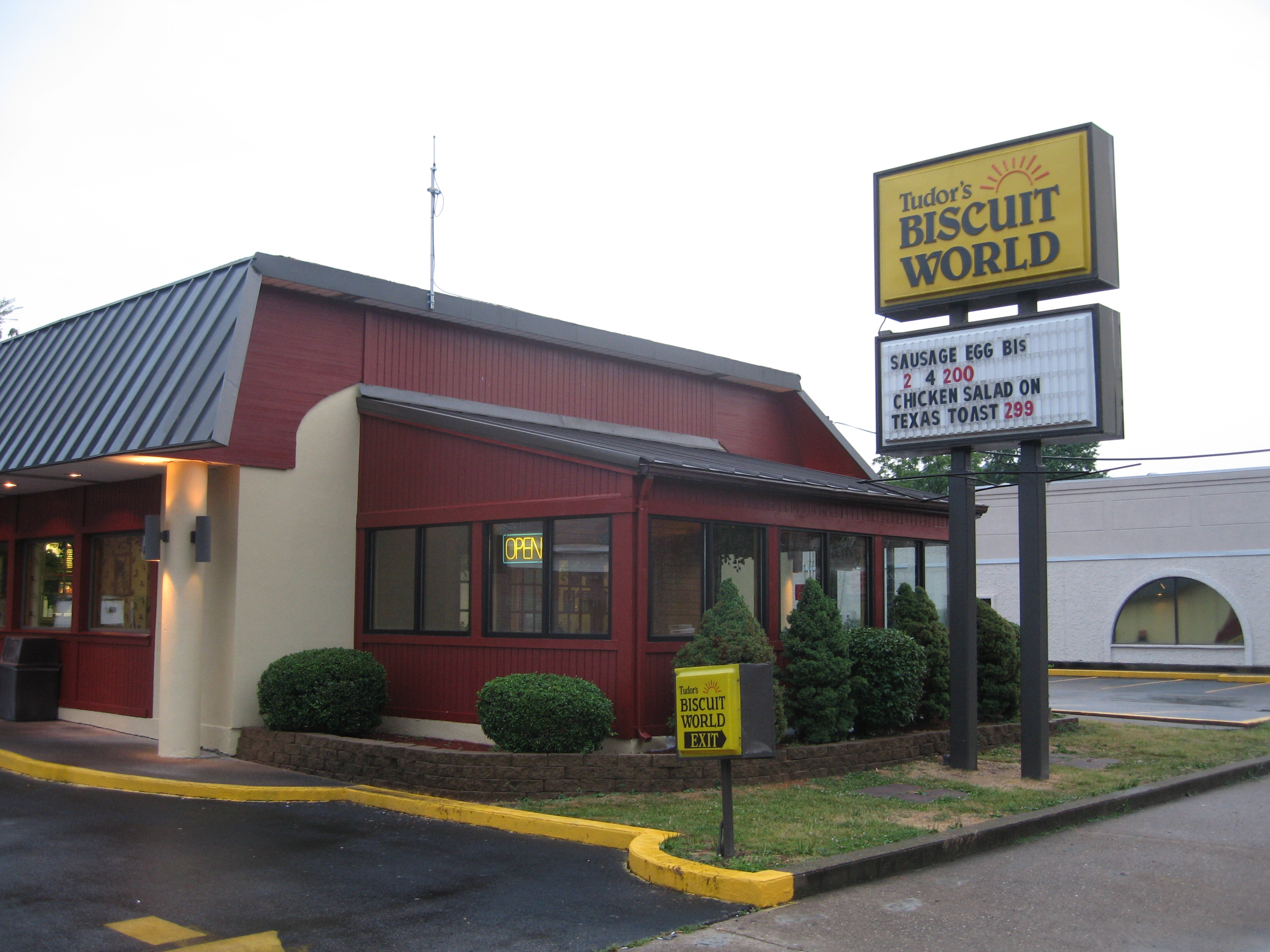
- Tudor's location in Charleston, West Virginia

Restaurant information
- Established: 1980; 46 years ago
- Food type: Primarily breakfast, with less popular lunch and dinner menus
- Dress code: Casual
- Location: United States
- Other locations: Throughout West Virginia, Kentucky, Ohio, and Florida.
- Website: TudorsBiscuitWorld.com

Tudor's Biscuit World is a restaurant chain and franchise based in Nitro, West Virginia, most commonly found in West Virginia. Many West Virginia locations share a building with Gino's Pizza and Spaghetti, although the chain is more extensive than Gino's (which is exclusive to West Virginia), having locations in southern Ohio and eastern and central Kentucky. In 2016 a franchise was opened in Panama City, Florida.

Tudor's serves biscuits, biscuit sandwiches, homestyle breakfasts and dinners, muffins, and several side dishes. The chain was originally based in Charleston, West Virginia and many of the biscuit sandwiches are named for sports teams of interest in that area, including teams at Marshall University, West Virginia University, and The University of Charleston. As of 2023, the chain has over 70 locations in 4 states.

== History ==
Tudor's Biscuit World was the original idea and concept of Bill and Mae Tudor and their son John Tudor. Bill and Mae opened the first Tudors on Washington Street in Charleston, West Virginia, in 1980. Their son John joined them two months later after graduating from East Carolina University. They opened more stores in the Charleston and Huntington areas, and began selling franchises.

In 1986, Bill Tudor died and John and his mother continued to grow the business with the addition of Oshel Craigo as their new franchise partner.

Tudor's Biscuit World biscuits are named for real customers. Many biscuits are named after regular customers of the original Tudor’s Biscuit World, including the Ron, Dottie, and Tootie.
