= Jeno's Pizza =

Jeno's Pizza may refer to:

- Jeno's, brand of frozen pizza products founded by Jeno Paulucci and operated by General Mills' Jeno's / Totino's division
- Jeno's Pizza (Colombia), a Colombian pizzeria chain owned by Telepizza

== See also ==
- Gino's East, Chicago-based pizzeria chain
- Gino's Pizza and Spaghetti, pizzeria chain in West Virginia
- Papa Gino's, restaurant chain based in Dedham, Massachusetts, USA
