= Diamond Teeth Mary =

American singer (1902–2000)

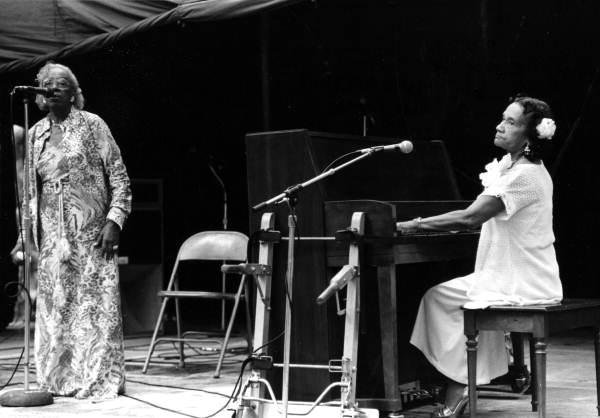
- McClain (left) performing in 1982

Background information
- Also known as: Walking Mary; Mary McClain
- Born: Mary Smith; August 27, 1902; Huntington, West Virginia, United States
- Died: April 4, 2000 (aged 97) St. Petersburg, Florida, US
- Genres: Blues, vaudeville, gospel
- Instrument: Vocals
- Years active: 1910s-1990s

"Diamond Teeth" Mary McClain (born Mary Smith, August 27, 1902 – April 4, 2000) was an American blues and gospel singer and vaudeville entertainer, whose career as a performer extended from the 1910s to the 1990s.

== Biography ==
Smith was born in Huntington, West Virginia. She was a half-sister of the blues singer Bessie Smith (Bessie's mother, Laura, née Owens, married Mary's father). She left home at the age of 13, to avoid beatings, and joined a circus. She performed as a chorus girl in Memphis, Tennessee, and in various minstrel shows during the 1920s and 1930s, including Irvin C. Miller's Brown Skin Models, the Davis S. Bell Medicine Show, and F. S. Wolcott's Rabbit Foot Minstrels. She was known as "Walking Mary" until the 1940s. She worked with Bessie Smith and was present at her death in 1937, later saying, "Bessie was lying in a hospital waiting room, her arm hanging by a thread and bleeding in a pan while the white doctors stood by and watched doing nothing. They let her die."

In the 1940s, she had diamonds removed from a bracelet and set into her front teeth, creating a dazzling effect and giving her a new stage name, "Diamond Teeth Mary". The diamonds were eventually removed to help pay her mother's medical bills. She performed in nightclubs and theatres (including the Apollo Theatre) and toured Europe with the United Service Organizations (USO). She also sang at the Cotton Club and Carnegie Hall. At various times she performed with Billie Holiday, Sarah Vaughan, Ray Charles, Count Basie, Nat King Cole, and Duke Ellington, and she was often promoted as the "Queen of the Blues". She continued to play with touring shows, and in 1954 was reported as being the lead blues singer with the Rabbit's Foot Minstrels.

Among the stories she told about her long career were that she had lived for a time with the baseball star Satchel Paige and that the young Elvis Presley "would bring Howlin' Wolf and me liquor from the liquor cabinet." The blues singer Johnny Copeland said of her, "Mary is why I became a musician. I remember peeking under the tent when the medicine show came through town. She was the big star and I was the little boy who said I want to be on that stage too." John Lee Hooker and Big Mama Thornton also credited her with giving them their start in the music business.

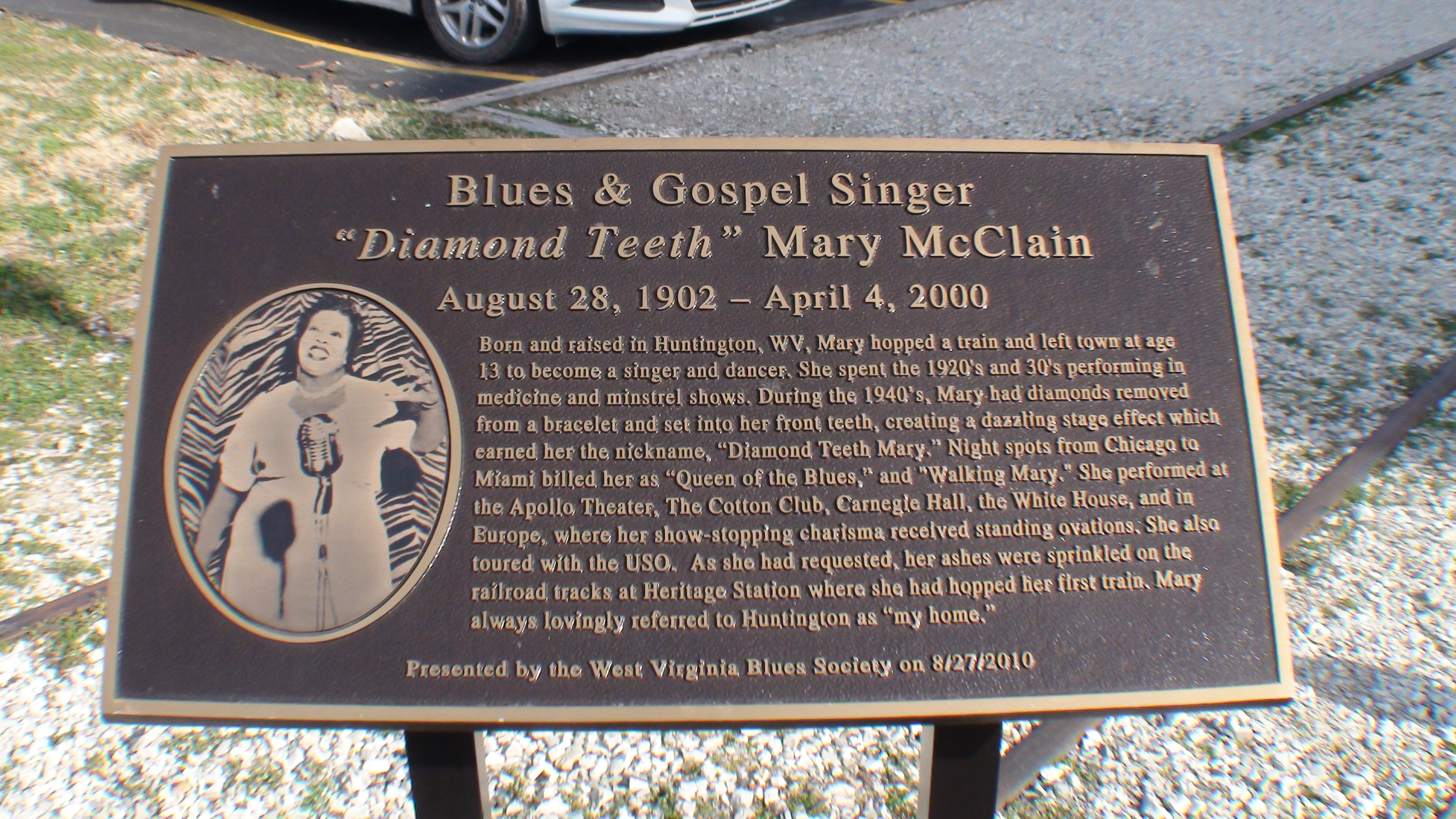
Marker at Huntington Station, where Mary hopped her first train.

In 1960 she settled in Bradenton, Florida, and in 1964 married her second husband, Clifford McClain, who died in 1983. She began singing gospel music rather than secular blues, giving up her nightclub engagements but becoming a star at local church events. In the late 1970s, she was tracked down by Steven Zeitlin of the Smithsonian Institution, and started to be given national exposure. She performed at the Smithsonian Folklife Festival and sang for President Ronald Reagan at the White House in 1980. She was featured in a documentary, Free Show Tonight; toured in Europe in 1981; and appeared in an off-Broadway production, The Vi-Ton-Ka Medicine Show in 1983.

In 1986, she became one of the first recipients of the Florida Folk Heritage Award. She recorded her first album, If I Can't Sell It, I'm Gonna Sit on It, released by Big Boss Records in 1993. She toured Europe again in the 1990s, and continued to perform at blues festivals until shortly before her death in 2000, at the age of 97. Her ashes were scattered on the railroad tracks in West Virginia where she first hopped a train.

A play about her life premiered at the Florida Folk Festival in 2000. Her gowns were later put on display in the Florida State Museum and the Blues Hall of Fame Museum in Memphis. Since 2009, there has been a Diamond Teeth Mary Blues Festival, hosted at the Huntington Station, in Huntington, West Virginia.

== Discography ==
- 1993 - If I Can't Sell It, I'm Gonna Sit on It
- 1993 - Walking Mary’s Blues
