= Mallow (Super Mario RPG) =

Fictional character from Super Mario RPG

Prince Mallow
- Super Mario RPG character
- Mallow as he appeared in the Super Mario RPG remake (2023)
- First game: Super Mario RPG (1996)
- Created by: Jiro Mifune
- Designed by: Hideo Minaba

In-universe information
- Species: Nimbus (Cloud)
- Home: Nimbus Land

Prince Mallow (Japanese: マロ, Hepburn: Maro) is a character who first appeared in Square's 1996 role-playing video game Super Mario RPG: Legend of the Seven Stars, which was published by Nintendo for the Super Nintendo Entertainment System. Mallow is a cloud-like being originating from a kingdom known as Nimbus Land, but was separated from his parents, the King and Queen of Nimbus Land, at a young age and was raised as a tadpole by the Frog Sage. Mallow is introduced as one of the game's party members who fights alongside Mario to stop the game's main antagonists, the Smithy gang. In Super Mario RPG, Mallow primarily uses magic attacks on his foes in battle by manipulating the weather, with some comparing his role in the party to spellcaster roles in other role-playing video games.

Mallow received positive reception for his design and storyline, with many praising his character arc from a meek cry-baby to a strong and brave prince who became a hero in his own right. He also received additional commentary regarding his regional differences between his Japanese and English translations. Since his introduction, both fans and critics have asked Super Mario RPG's developers for Mallow to return to the Mario series in the future.

== Character design ==
The Keron concept art by Jiro Mifune

One of the finalised concept art pieces by Hideo Minaba

Mallow is a member of the Nimbus, a species of bipedal cloud-like beings from Nimbus Land. He is depicted as being small, rotund and fluffy, with an ivory-coloured body and a pink curl of hair on his head. Mallow wears pink shoes and blue and white striped pants, held up by a belt. Writers for Nintendo Life believe Mallow's species to be derived from the cirrus genus of clouds.

In battle, Mallow is seen as the spellcaster of the team, where he is more adept at using magic attacks rather than physical attacks. During combat, his magical attacks are primarily weather-based as he is able to control the weather using his emotions to attack enemies, such as summoning lightning, a large snowman or even star rain. He can also summon rain to heal a team member. Mallow is also telepathic; his "Thought Peak" move (originally referred to as "Pyschopath" in the 1996 version) allows him to read the enemy's mind to see what they are thinking as well as to help figure out their weakness. The magic used by Mallow is represented by a club symbol. Outside of his magic attacks, Mallow can equip himself with either gloves, cymbals or a stick to physically attack his enemies.

According to designer Hideo Minaba, Super Mario RPG was planned to feature two original playable characters alongside Mario, and so the team were asked to formulate ideas for character designs and create illustrations for them, with some of the designs ending up as NPCs in the final game. During this early stage of development, former Square developer Jiro Mifune began designing and conceptualising characters for the game, approaching the design theme of the characters with a The Three Musketeers motif, as at the time Mifune had difficulty imagining Mario donning a suit of armour and a sword. During this period, Mifune sketched a character named Keron, a young frog boy who was originally going to travel with Mario and his party. Mifune would later release many of these concept sketches on his Twitter account in November 2023. Keron is believed to have acted as the origin point for Mallow, who would eventually be reworked into the latter over the course of development, with the frog aspects of the character being written into the character's in-game origins. The design that more closely resembled Mallow's finalised appearance was initially conceived as a marshmallow-like character with a curled bang at the front. According to Minaba, he took the design and began to finalise the design by giving Mallow some fluffy pants and reworked him into more of a cloud-inspired character instead. Minaba explained in his artbook that by changing Mallow into a cloud, it would allow him to use elemental powers such as generating lightning and wind, similar to the wizard role in other role-playing video games.

== Appearances ==
=== Main appearances ===
Mallow's first appearance is in 1996's Super Mario RPG: Legend of the Seven Stars as one of the game's five party members. Mario first meets Mallow outside Peach's Castle where he witnesses Mallow chasing and ultimately failing to catch a thief named Croco, resulting in Mallow crying which causes the weather to begin to rain. When Mario approaches him, Mallow introduces himself as a tadpole from Tadpole Pond and explains that he had visited the Mushroom Kingdom to buy a cricket pie for his grandfather, but the frog coin he was going to use to purchase the pie was stolen by Croco. Mario offers to help Mallow and the pair team up to find the thief. The pair travel along Bandit's Way and defeat Croco, returning Mallow's Frog Coin to him. Arriving back from their battle, they find the kingdom overrun with a faction of the group known as the Smithy gang, the game's main antagonists. Inside the castle, the pair encounter and defeat the faction's lieutenant, Claymorton (known as Mack in the original game), who drops a Star Piece. The kingdom's chancellor thanks the pair and instructs them to head to Tadpole Pond to get advice on the matter from the Frog Sage (known as Frogfucius in the original game), Mallow's grandfather. At Tadpole Pond, the Frog Sage reveals that Mallow is not actually a tadpole nor his biological grandson and explains that he found Mallow as baby in basket and chose to raise him as a tadpole. Conflicted in his emotions, Mallow is confident that his real parents are still out there and says he will join Mario on his adventure in find the Star Pieces and hopefully find his parents along the way.

During the journey, Mario, Mallow, and the other party members, eventually arrive at Nimbus Land. Whilst there, they witness a woman named Valentina who claims she has found the lost Prince Mallow, who is actually her large bird assistant named Dodo, and that he plans to marry her and make her the new queen. Later, the party find a sculptor named Garro, who at the back of his place has a golden statue, which Mallow remarks looks almost identical to him. Garro explains to the group that Valentina had taken the rulers of Nimbus Land captive and has Dodo impersonating as the prince; he also reveals that Mallow originated from Nimbus Land and was in fact the true lost prince. Determined to put an end to the ruse, the party sneak into the Nimbus Land palace by disguising Mario as a statue. They eventually defeat Valentina and free Mallow's parents, the King and Queen. Although given the choice to stay with them, Mallow says he will stay with Mario until the adventure is over. Near the end of the game, Mallow and the other party members confront Smithy in his lair. Following Smithy's defeat, Mallow returns to Nimbus Land, where he is seen alongside his parents having taken on his role as prince.

Mallow retains the same role in the 2023 remake Super Mario RPG. In the remake, he can unlock a new weapon called the Sage Stick that is only available by beating the boss Belome again in the new postgame. A new mechanic was introduced called "Triple Moves" which allows all party members in a battle to unleash a powerful move; depending on who performs a triple move, the outcome of the move changes. An example of this is the move "Star Riders", which is an attack performed by Mallow, Mario and Geno that does significant damage to one enemy at a time. However, if Geno is swapped for Princess Peach, a new move called "Healing Rainbow" is performed instead, which causes all member of the party to be healed or even revived. Another new feature added to the remake is a scrapbook where events from the game are logged by Mallow.

In November 2023, Super Mario RPG character artist Kazuyuki Kurashima posted a series of sketches related to the development of the game, with one of the pieces pertaining to an unreleased Super Mario RPG 2. The art depicts Mario and Mallow facing off against Bowser, with various other characters such as Princess Peach and Luigi featured. However, over the course of development, the sequel would instead become an entirely new series in the form of Paper Mario, which abandoned the unique world and characters of RPG following the departure of Square's involvement during its development.

=== Other appearances ===
In Super Smash Bros. Ultimate, Mallow appears as collectable known as a "Spirit", where the player fights in a match under certain conditions. He is also represented in the Geno spirit battle, where Mallow is represented in the match by a grey Kirby. In November 2023, a free limited time background was added to Tetris 99 in promotion of the Super Mario RPG remake, which featured promotional art of Mallow alongside Mario, Princess Peach, Bowser and Geno. Mallow also made an appearance in the Japanese manga adaptation of the Mario franchise, Super Mario-kun.

== Critical reception ==
Following his appearance in Super Mario RPG, Mallow was praised by critics for being a standout character, with USGamer reporter Mathew Olson describing him as his favourite companion in the role-playing video game genre. Olsen wrote that he hoped to see Mallow reappear in another game in the future, though admitted that with the subsequent release of other Mario RPG series, his chances of being brought back became "more and more like a remote possibility." Real Sound writer Moe Harumaki similarly declared Mallow as being her favourite character in the game, noting that whilst she was initially shocked and confused by the character's introduction as she believed Mario's companions would be other reoccurring Mario characters such as Luigi or Yoshi, she grew to love both his personality and his design, describing Mallow's appearance as looking like a "melting vanilla ice cream". Connor Christie from Pocket Tactics also called Mallow their favourite character, writing that Mallow's "endearing naivety" reminded him of Vivi Ornitier from Final Fantasy IX, though remarked that Mallow lacked Vivi's "existential pondering."

Magmix's Fumi-kun remarked how despite having a fluffy appearance, they were surprised by how sharp and mysterious Mallow was written, though still regarded him as having a loveable personality. Ozzie Mejia of Shacknews deemed that because Mario was mute in the game, Mallow acted as a pivotal character in helping to present Super Mario RPG's world, describing him as an "everyman standing in contrast with the rest of the cast" due to him seeing the wider world for the first time. Mejia further stated that this is better juxtaposed by the reveal that Mallow is actually a prince, writing that while Mallow and Mario are both from the same world, they each have "their own kingdoms and their own stories to live out." In an article for Game Rant, Zackari Greif felt that Mallow was often overlooked by fans for other original characters in RPG such as Geno, but believed Mallow to be a worthwhile character that should be recognised more alongside the others. In his defence, Greif opined that Mallow was the heart of Super Mario RPG's story and that Mallow's character evolution by the end of the game made him shine, admiring the character for his growth by the time he reached Nimbus Land. When interviewed by Famitsu about Super Mario RPG, Japanese professional wrestler Hiromu Takahashi mentioned that whilst Geno was his favourite character, he admitted that he did also like Mallow and that his introduction scene was his favourite scene in the game; Takahashi said that he found the scene visually beautiful and admired Mallow's lines during the scene where is trying to talk himself out of crying, finding that he could really feel his resolve in that scene.

Many critics responded positively to Mallow's character arc and his emotional growth over the course of the game. In an article for Nerdist, Christy Admiraal lauded Mallow for how dynamically he was written during the game's narrative, noting how despite never losing his sensitivity, he became braver and more empowered near the end of the game compared to "emotional wreck with a heart of gold" that started out as. Admiraal also pointed to how good the character's interactions was with other characters as being fun and "downright delightful", and mentioned how she found the scene involving the reunion with his parents to be "predictably emotional". Writing for Destructoid, Chad Concelmo praised Mallow for his storyline and his personality, recalling how upon his introduction being "charmed by Mallow's innocence". Commenting on his story, Concelmo believed Mallow's was the best compared to the other core characters for being less predicable, citing that the introduction of the search for his real parents gave the game's less than complex story a "much needed dose of adorable mystery" and regarding it as paying off well by the end. Additionally, Concelmo commented how Mallow was a vital character for the earlier parts of RPG due to his ability to heal other party members, though lamented that he became outclassed and overshadowed once Princess Peach joins the group. Others commented on how well Mallow's character leaned into the comedy of RPG, with Destructoid's Ben Davis and Slant Magazine's Mitchell Demorest using the scene where Mallow finds out he isn't a tadpole as an example of the game's humour, finding it funny how the scene is played straight and dramatic despite how obvious the reveal is.

Due to Mallow's popularity, critics and fans have asked for his return in a new game, with writers Katano from Magmix and Ryan Bates from GameRevolution requested that he be added as a playable fighter to the Super Smash Bros. series. In 2019, a group of fans filed a petition on Change.org under the name Operation Starfall. In the petition, the fans laid out the conditions to have Nintendo and Square Enix bring back the original characters for Super Mario RPG in a remake/sequel and have both Mallow and Geno return in the future in new Mario instalments. Zackari Greif wrote he hoped to see both Mallow and Geno again in a future Mario titles, stating that both were iconic and popular with fans, and that following the release of the 2023 remake, Nintendo and Square Enix should work to ensure that the characters become mainstays in the series. Greif added that allowing them to become neglected again would "be a missed opportunity like no other."

=== Name and regional differences ===
Some outlets have noted how some key aspects were removed from Mallow from the Japanese version in the English localisation, with critics arguing that these aspects detracted from Mallow's overall character and humour. Writer Drew Mackie commented that whilst on a surface level Mallow's name is likely based on marshmallows which matches his soft and white design, he also noted how mallows are also a genus of plant most commonly associated with both the confectionary as well as the plant Althaea officinalis, which both inspired the name of and was used in the creation of the former. He explained how the plant originated from marshes and swamps in Ancient Egypt and over history was brought to countries such as Iran and France to be created into halva and "pâte de guimauve" (marshmallow paste) respectively, which were close to modern day marshmallows; Mackie argued that this history reflected Mallow's adventure from the marshy Tadpole Pond to "to a fanciful kingdom in the clouds." However, Mackie believed that Mallow's Japanese name, Maro (マロ), had a funnier and more suitable name to fit his character. He analysed that the name Maro was very close to Mario's name, which he noted was a similar circumstance to Mario's first partner in Paper Mario, Goombario. Mackie observed that whilst not similar in appearance, Mallow was like a lesser Mario where he was not a famous nor capable, adding that his name was "a little like Mario but also a little lacking", but instead through his character arc learns to be a hero in his own way. He furthered the comparison by adding that in Japanese, Nimbus Land is called "Marshmallow Kingdom", which he believe was intentionally chosen as its sound similar to the Mushroom Kingdom, the land which Mario is considered the hero of. Mackie concluded that whilst maybe not as cool as Geno in design, Mallow "pack[ed] a lot of linguistic intrigue into that squat, puffy frame."

Other outlets have pointed out how the English translation neglected many of the pop culture references made with Mallow's Thought Peek move. Publications such as Legends of Localization and Magmix have pointed that in the Japanese version, the move, known as "Watcha Thinking?", has dialogue of the enemies' thoughts that make references to popular Japanese media such as anime, manga and music, from the 1980s and '90s; some of the references noticed by writers including Neon Genesis Evangelion, Dragon Ball, Gundam, "Shadow City" by Akira Terao, Kani Dōraku, and Virtua Fighter. Fumi-kun believed these references were one of the game's greatest strengths and helped elevate the overall quality and humour of the game. Both Clyde Mandelin of Legends of Localization and Angela Marrujo Fornaca from Nintendojo opined that they wished some of these references could have been kept in the English translation or at least replace them with western regional references instead.
