= Super Mario RPG =

1996 video game

Super Mario RPG: Legend of the Seven Stars
- North American box art, depicting (from left to right) Exor, Bowser, Princess Toadstool, and Mario
- Developer: Square
- Publisher: Nintendo
- Directors: Yoshihiko Maekawa; Chihiro Fujioka
- Producer: Shigeru Miyamoto
- Programmer: Fumiaki Fukaya
- Artists: Hideo Minaba; Kiyofumi Kato; Yuko Hatae
- Writers: Kensuke Tanabe; Atsushi Tejima
- Composer: Yoko Shimomura
- Series: Mario
- Platform: Super Nintendo Entertainment System
- Release: JP: March 9, 1996; NA: May 13, 1996
- Genre: Role-playing
- Mode: Single-player

Super Mario RPG: Legend of the Seven Stars (Note: Known in Japan as Super Mario RPG (Japanese: スーパーマリオRPG, Hepburn: Sūpā Mario Ārupījī)) is a 1996 role-playing video game developed by Square and published by Nintendo for the Super Nintendo Entertainment System (SNES). It was the final Mario game for the SNES, and was directed by Chihiro Fujioka and Yoshihiko Maekawa, produced by Shigeru Miyamoto, and scored by Yoko Shimomura.

Super Mario RPG's story focuses on Mario and his friends as they seek to defeat the Smithy Gang, who have crashed into their world and scattered the seven star pieces of Star Road. It is the first RPG in the Mario franchise, drawing from major elements of Square's RPG franchises such as Final Fantasy. The main form of fighting enemies is turn-based combat with a party of up to three characters. It is also the first game in the Mario franchise to have gameplay within an isometric 3D environment, allowing for a new variety of the exploration and platforming elements reminiscent of the Super Mario series. The game features many new characters, such as Mallow and Geno.

Super Mario RPG was commercially successful and critically acclaimed, particularly for its humor and 3D-rendered graphics. It was released on the Wii's Virtual Console service in 2008, marking its debut in Europe and Australia, and for the Wii U's Virtual Console in 2015. It was also included with the Super NES Classic Edition in 2017. A remake developed by ArtePiazza for the Nintendo Switch was released in 2023 and received positive reviews. Super Mario RPG was followed by the Mario RPG series Paper Mario and Mario & Luigi, which retain some gameplay elements.

== Gameplay ==
Mario in a battle against enemy Terrapins in the Bowser's Keep level

Super Mario RPG contains token similarities to other Square-developed video games, such as the Final Fantasy series, along with a story and gameplay based on the Super Mario series of platform games. Like most traditional JRPGs, the two main sections of the game are adventuring and turn-based battle sequences. Much of Super Mario RPG's gameplay is outside monster battles and plays like an isometric 3D platformer, in which traditional Mario elements, such as punching floating question blocks from below, are prominent. There are no random encounters, and as such, enemies are visible in the field; a battle ensues only if Mario comes in contact with one. This allows the player to evade unnecessary battles.

The player's party initially begins with only Mario and grows to five characters. Mario and up to two other members participate in battles, who can be swapped in and out while the player explores the overworld. Each of the five characters has a unique set of attacks and techniques. For example, Princess Toadstool's abilities are primarily healing techniques, whereas Geno and Bowser have offensive attacks that deal high amounts of damage. The combat is based on a traditional turn-based battle system with the addition of action commands that amplify a move's effects. The player starts each turn by choosing to attack, defend, run, use an item, or perform magic from the combat menu. The action command consists of timed button presses during an attack, special move, defense, or item usage, which became a mainstay of later Mario RPGs.

== Story ==
=== Characters and setting ===
The game world is set in a geographically diverse land, which includes mountains, forests, and bodies of water. Each region has distinct characteristics held by its inhabitants; Mushroom Kingdom is inhabited by Toads, Moleville is inhabited by moles, Monstro Town is populated by reformed monsters, Yo'ster Isle is where Yoshi and his eponymous species reside, and Nimbus Land is an area inhabited by cloud people. Bowser's Castle is another prominent location and, during the events of the game, holds the portal to the Smithy Gang's homeworld.

As in most Super Mario games, the main protagonist is Mario, whose initial goal is to rescue Princess Toadstool from Bowser. Soon after the start of his journey, the Smithy Gang, the main antagonists of the game, invades Mario's world. While attempting to stop the group, Mario is joined by Mallow, a cloud boy who thinks he is a tadpole; Geno, a doll possessed by a celestial spirit from the Star Road; Bowser, whose armies have deserted him out of fear of the Smithy Gang; and Princess Toadstool, who was lost in the turmoil that occurred when the Smithy Gang arrived. The Smithy Gang is led by Smithy, a robotic blacksmith from another world with aspirations of world domination.

=== Plot ===
One day, Mario sets out once again to rescue Princess Toadstool from Bowser at his castle. During their battle, a giant animate sword named Exor falls from the sky, breaks through the Star Road (a pathway that helps grant people's wishes), and crashes into Bowser's castle, sending Mario, Toadstool, and Bowser flying in different directions, as well as scattering the seven-star fragments. Mario lands back at his pad and meets up with Toad, who tells him he has to rescue Toadstool. Mario returns to Bowser's castle, but Exor destroys the bridge, preventing him from entering. Mario makes his way to the Mushroom Kingdom, where Mario encounters a "tadpole" named Mallow who has set out to retrieve a frog coin taken by the local thief Croco. After Mario helps him retrieve the frog coin, they return to the Mushroom Kingdom to find that it is overrun by the Smithy Gang, followers of the evil robotic blacksmith king named Smithy. Mario and Mallow enter the castle to defeat their lieutenant, Mack, and subsequently find a mysterious Star Piece. Mallow accompanies Mario to Tadpole Pond so they can get advice from Frogfucius, Mallow's grandfather. He reveals that Mallow is not really a tadpole, and says Mallow should join Mario on a quest to find the seven Star Pieces as well as Mallow's real parents.

The duo travel to Rose Town where they meet a star spirit who has animated and taken control of a wooden doll named Geno. After battling the bow-like creature Bowyer, who is immobilizing residents of Rose Town with his arrows, they retrieve another Star Piece. Geno joins Mario and reveals to him the Star Piece is a part of the shattered Star Road, where he normally resides. Geno has been tasked with repairing the Star Road and defeating Smithy, so that the world's wishes may again be heard. The trio retrieve the third star piece then head to Booster Tower, the home of the eccentric amusement-venue owner, Booster, where they encounter Bowser, whose minions have all deserted him. Bowser reluctantly asks Mario to help him to reclaim his castle; Mario agrees, allowing Bowser to save face by pretending he is joining the Koopa Troop, and Bowser joins the party. The new team intercepts Princess Toadstool just before she is forcibly married to Booster, but it turns out that the wedding was not real; Booster, having no idea what a marriage actually is, just thought it was a fun party and abruptly returns home after devouring the cake.

After her rescue, the princess returns home to Mushroom Kingdom only to then decide to join the party while her grandmother takes her place in disguise. After recovering two more star pieces, they search Nimbus Land. A statue maker, Garro, informs them that Valentina has the rulers of Nimbus Land being held captive, and her sidekick Dodo is impersonating the prince so he can make Valentina queen. Garro recognizes Mallow as the true prince, then disguises Mario as a statue to infiltrate the castle. There they defeat Valentina and Dodo and liberate Mallow’s parents, the King and Queen.

After traveling to Barrel Volcano to obtain the sixth Star Piece, Mario's party learns that the final piece must be held by Smithy in Bowser's castle. They battle their way through the assembled enemies to enter the castle, where they discover that Exor is actually a gateway to Smithy's factory, the place where Smithy mass-produces his army. Mario and company cross over, find the heart of the factory, and defeat Smithy, thereby stopping his army creation and causing Exor to disappear. The collected Star Pieces are used to repair the Star Road, Geno returns to the Star Road, Bowser rebuilds his castle with his newly reformed army, Mallow regains his rightful title as prince of Nimbus Land, and Mario and Princess Toadstool return to the Mushroom Kingdom to celebrate their victory.

== Development ==
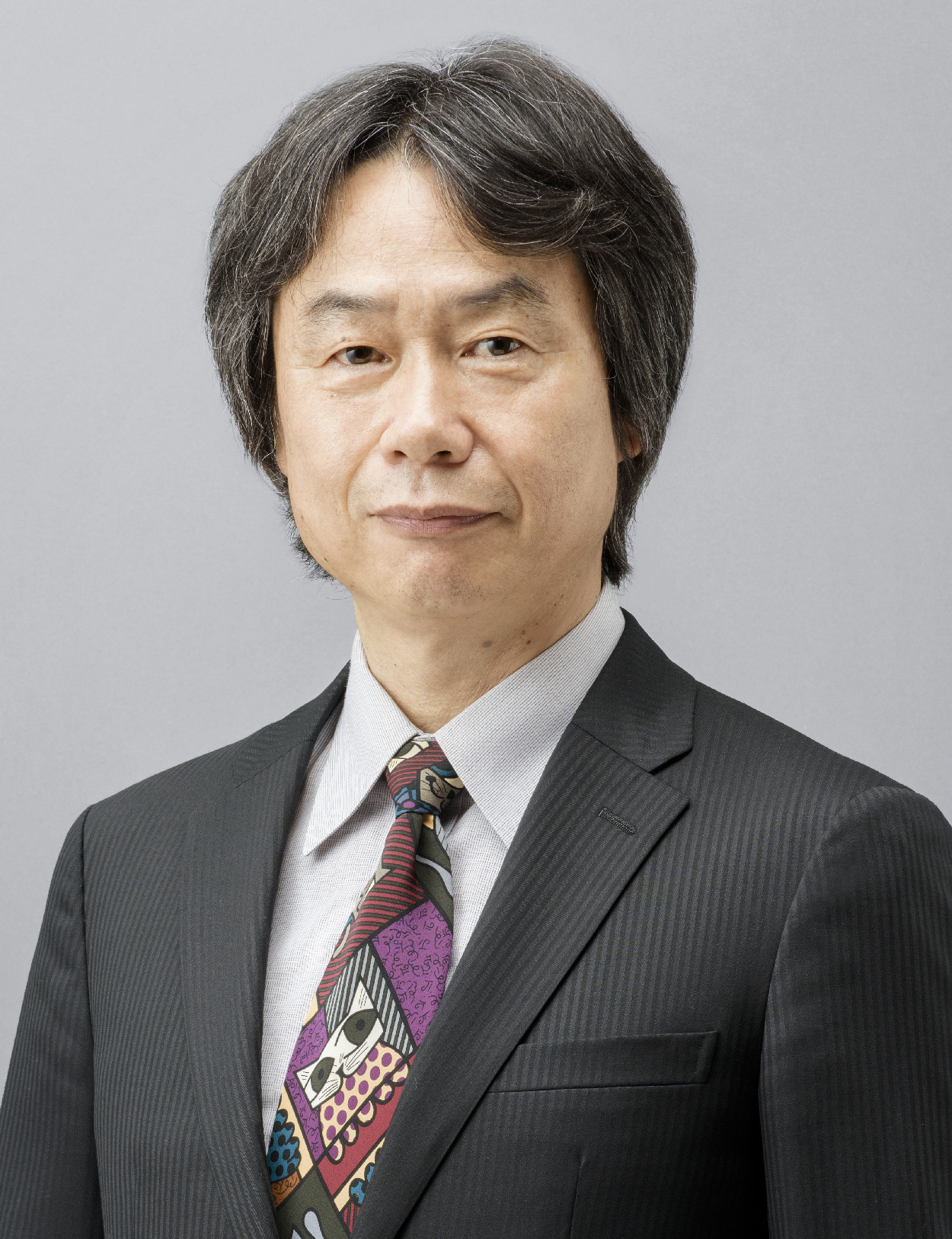
Shigeru Miyamoto (pictured in 2015) served as producer for Super Mario RPG.

According to Yoshio Hongo of Nintendo, Super Mario RPG came out of Mario creator Shigeru Miyamoto's desire to make an RPG using Mario, as well as Square's desire to develop an RPG that could do better outside of Japan than their previous games. Development began in early 1994 after a business meeting between Nintendo and Square. The first phase was spent on deciding a basic system, while the isometric view was chosen to help bring the world to life. The game was originally conceived with weapons in mind, but as meetings with Miyamoto progressed, the development team realized that they did not fit with the Mario franchise, and left them out. An exception was the hammer, which Miyamoto insisted on keeping. One of the main concerns of the development team was they did not want to make a "normal RPG that simply substituted in Mario characters." To help the game fit with the Mario series, it was made to be more action- and movement-focused compared to Square's other RPGs, using concepts such as jumping and dashing. Development began in earnest during the second quarter of 1995, when the programming, story events, and graphics data were being implemented.

The game was officially announced by Miyamoto and co-director Chihiro Fujioka at the 1995 V-Jump Festival event in Japan. Miyamoto led teams at Nintendo and Square, who spent over a year developing the graphics. Square reported that the game was about 70% complete in October 1995. The developers created the interior elements such as columns, stairways, and exterior elements with advanced computer modeling techniques. Special lighting effects were used to create shadows and reflections that were meant to improve the 3D elements. Shinya Takahashi, who would later become head of Nintendo SPD and Nintendo EPD, designed the game's CG models. With guidance from Miyamoto, Square developed the game, combining role-playing aspects of previous Square games like Final Fantasy VI with the platforming elements of Mario games. Square's Final Fantasy series was the model for the battle sequences, while the tradition of Mario games demanded a lot of action. Mario's ability to jog in eight directions and jump up or down in a three–quarter perspective gave him a comparatively large range of motion. At 70% completion, the mix of adventure and action gameplay elements placed it in a category closer to The Legend of Zelda: A Link to the Past.

When Nintendo of America received a 60% complete version of the game in November, its staff was surprised at the inclusion of an RPG battle system. The battle screens, using pre-rendered sprites as in the rest of the game, included attack animations of equipped weapons. In December, further development and improvements to the gameplay delayed the translation of the game. For example, the Chancellor, who was named the Mushroom Retainer in Japan, was called the "Minister" in North America. Plans continued through February 1996 for the North American version, with the release date being pushed back from winter to spring.

The game's soundtrack was composed by Yoko Shimomura, who incorporated arrangements of music by Koji Kondo from Super Mario Bros., and three tracks by Nobuo Uematsu from Final Fantasy IV. Shimomura regards the Super Mario RPG score as one of the turning points in her career. On March 25, 1996, NTT Publishing released a two-disc soundtrack album, Super Mario RPG Original Sound Version.

Super Mario RPG: Legend of the Seven Stars is one of only seven SNES games released outside Japan to use the Nintendo SA-1 chip. Compared with standard SNES games, the additional microprocessor allows higher clock speeds; faster access to the random-access memory (RAM); greater memory mapping capabilities, data storage, and compression; new direct memory access (DMA) modes, such as bitmap to bit plane transfer; and built-in CIC lockout for piracy protection and regional marketing control. The game was originally not released in PAL regions, as Nintendo representatives cited the need to optimize the game for PAL televisions and translate it into multiple languages.

== Release ==
Super Mario RPG was first released in Japan on March 9, 1996. It sold 1.47 million copies in Japan, making it the third best-selling game of 1996 in that region. For the game's North American release in May of 1996, Nintendo shipped 300,000 copies to retailers in the United States. The game's North American sales surpassed Nintendo's expectations, with an estimated sell-through of more than 200,000 units within a month on shelves. A representative for Nintendo of America said that it was "on track to easily exceed our 500,000 target, and it may easily become a one million seller by the end of this calendar year." By August 24, it had been the most-rented game in the United States for 14 weeks straight. Super Mario RPG became the sixth best-selling game of 1996 in the United States. It was the last SNES game released by Square in North America, with Treasure of the Rudras and Treasure Hunter G being its last games released in Japan.

On June 24, 2008, Super Mario RPG was released for the Wii's Virtual Console service in Japan. It was released for the first time in Europe and Australia for the Wii Virtual Console on August 22, 2008, as part of the third Hanabi Festival (a period in which several games not previously available in Europe were released on the Wii Virtual Console). The Wii Virtual Console version saw a release in North America on September 1, 2008, being the 250th Virtual Console game released in that region. Super Mario RPG was released on the Wii U Virtual Console in Japan on August 5, 2015, in Europe and Australia on December 24, 2015, and in North America on June 30, 2016. It was also included as one of 21 games for the Super NES Classic Edition in 2017.

== Reception ==
Reception

Aggregate scores
Aggregator	Score
GameRankings	89%
Metacritic	(NS) 84/100
OpenCritic	93% recommend

Review scores
Publication	Score
1Up.com	A
AllGame	5/5
Electronic Gaming Monthly	9.5/10, 9/10, 8.5/10, 8/10
Eurogamer	9/10
Famitsu	9/10, 9/10, 8/10, 7/10
Game Informer	9.25/10
Game Players	91%
IGN	9.5/10
Next Generation	4/5
Nintendo Life	10/10
RPGamer	4/5
RPGFan	86%
USgamer	4.5/5
Video Games (DE)	85%

Super Mario RPG received positive reviews. Though its battle system and characters were criticized by a few critics, it garnered praise for its graphics and for humor in particular. Nintendo Power's review commented that the "excellent" 3D graphics helped the game appeal to a much wider audience than most traditional RPGs. In March 1997, Nintendo Power nominated the game for several awards, including "Best Graphics", in a player's choice contest, though Super Mario 64 won "Best Graphics". Electronic Gaming Monthly praised the graphics, stating that they are "the best seen on the Super NES". Scary Larry of GamePro gave the game a perfect 5/5 in all four categories (graphics, sound, control, and fun factor), and praised the rendered enemies, cinematics, and spell animations.

1UP.com stated that the graphic element is "strong enough to resemble a Mario title but still retains the role-playing theme at the same time", and Electronic Gaming Monthly commented that the visuals are "typical of Nintendo, using clean and colorful graphics along with nice animation". RPGamer editor Derek Cavin called the backgrounds "beautiful" and stated that they "perfectly bring the Mushroom Kingdom and surrounding areas into 3D". Skyler Miller from Allgame stated that the graphics are "absolutely outstanding, with colorful, 3D rendered visuals that once seemed impossible on the Super NES. This is definitely the high watermark for 3D graphics on any 16-bit system". The editor also called the music "quite extraordinary" and that the pieces "match the mood of the surrounding environment". In the Virtual Console re-release, IGN's Lucas Thomas's review of Super Mario RPG stated that the game's experience "completes itself with a compelling story, a humorous attitude and a variety of interspersed mini-games that break up the adventuring action". The publication also stated that the soundtrack is "spectacular and a joy to listen to" and the graphics "took full advantage of the system's 16-bit technology and looks great".

Cavin said that most of the battle system mechanics "aren't very original" and also criticized the "lack of a unified storyline". In contrast, a reviewer for Next Generation found that the battle system refreshingly differed from tradition, and was pleased that "the elements that stand out from the traditional formula are those that make this a recognizable Mario game." He wrote that the gameplay was complex enough to challenge even veteran RPG gamers, yet simple enough to not alienate newcomers to the genre. Scary Larry similarly said the game "should please diehard RPG fans as well as novice players", as it is genuinely tough and offers considerable replay value in the form of sidequests and bonus features such as Toadofsky's music levels. He also found Squaresoft's signature humor and puzzle-solving to be as exceptional as usual. Miller commented that after engaging in many battles, "the battle music becomes monotonous" and that after the game is beaten, "There aren't any surprises to be discovered the second time around". While 1UP.com wrote that the characters were "too childish for older gamers", Next Generation said the game is "held together by the strength of its characters and well-developed world".

In 2009, Official Nintendo Magazine ranked the game 34th on a list of greatest Nintendo games. Electronic Gaming Monthly editors named Super Mario RPG a runner-up for both Super NES Game of the Year (behind Tetris Attack) and Role-Playing Game of the Year (behind Blood Omen: Legacy of Kain). In 2018, Complex ranked the game 8th on their "The Best Super Nintendo Games of All Time." In 2023, Time Extension included the game on their "Best JRPGs of All Time" list.

== Remake ==
Super Mario RPG
- Cover art
- Developer: ArtePiazza
- Publisher: Nintendo
- Director: Ayako Moriwaki
- Producers: Hiroyuki Miura; Toyokazu Nonaka; Shinya Saito
- Designer: Sachiko Sugimura
- Programmer: Kaoru Koga
- Artists: Shintaro Majima; Takeshi Tateishi
- Writer: Taro Kudo
- Composer: Yoko Shimomura
- Engine: Unity
- Platform: Nintendo Switch
- Release: November 17, 2023
- Genre: Role-playing
- Mode: Single-player

A remake of Super Mario RPG was announced for the Nintendo Switch in June 2023 and released on November 17, 2023. It was developed in the Unity engine by ArtePiazza, which had previously worked on games in Square Enix's Dragon Quest series. It features full 3D graphics, updated character and enemy names, with Princess Toadstool being called Princess Peach to reflect her modern nomenclature and Frogfucius being renamed Frog Sage, and the option to switch between the original music and a newly arranged soundtrack by Shimomura. New battle mechanics include the option to swap party members (except for Mario) in the middle of battle, the ability to damage all enemies when performing perfect action commands, and powerful team-specific "triple moves" performed after building a gauge using successful action commands. Other additions include an easier difficulty setting, a bestiary to view enemies the player has encountered, and post-game content, including a sound player and more difficult boss rematches.

=== Reception and sales ===
According to the review aggregrator website Metacritic, it received "generally favorable reviews" with an aggregate rating of 84, and 94% of critics recommend it on OpenCritic. As of March 31, 2024, the game has sold 3.31 million copies, with 860,000 sold in Japan, and 2.45 million internationally, surpassing the Super Nintendo original's release sales numbers.

== Legacy ==
Super Mario RPG appeared on reader-selected "best game of all time" lists, such as 30th at IGN, and critic-selected "best games of all time" lists, such as 26th in Electronic Gaming Monthly.

Super Mario RPG does not have a direct sequel but it established conventions for its thematic and spiritual successors, the Paper Mario series and Mario & Luigi series. Nintendo announced a game titled Super Mario RPG 2 for 64DD, which was renamed Paper Mario before its release on the Nintendo 64. Themes shared with the original include the use of Flower Points as a shared party resource instead of each character having their own pool of Magic Points, timed action commands during battles, and the collection of seven stars.

Fujioka and Maekawa went on to work at AlphaDream and worked on the Mario & Luigi series. Yoko Shimomura returned, having composed the soundtrack for every game with the exception of Mario & Luigi: Brothership. Mario & Luigi: Superstar Saga features a cameo of Geno in one of the minigames, and the end credits mention Square Enix as the copyright holder of the character; this cameo was removed for the game's Nintendo 3DS remake.

Various locations and characters from the game appear in the children's book Mario and the Incredible Rescue released by Scholastic in 2006. Though his only starring role in a video game was in Super Mario RPG, Masahiro Sakurai added the fan-favorite character Geno as a Mii Fighter costume to the crossover fighting game series Super Smash Bros. as paid downloadable content, attributing his inclusion to his matching arm cannon. Super Mario RPG is among the 21 preinstalled games on the Super NES Classic Edition in all regions, released in September 2017.
