= Genos (disambiguation) =

A genos was a type of social group in ancient Greece.

Genos may also refer to:

- Geno's Steaks, a restaurant in Philadelphia
- Génos, Haute-Garonne, a French commune in the Haute-Garonne department
- Génos, Hautes-Pyrénées, a French commune in the Hautes-Pyrénées department
- Genos, a character in the web comic manga series One-Punch Man

== See also ==
- Geno (disambiguation)
