= Sassari Courthouse =

Judiciary building in Sassari, Italy

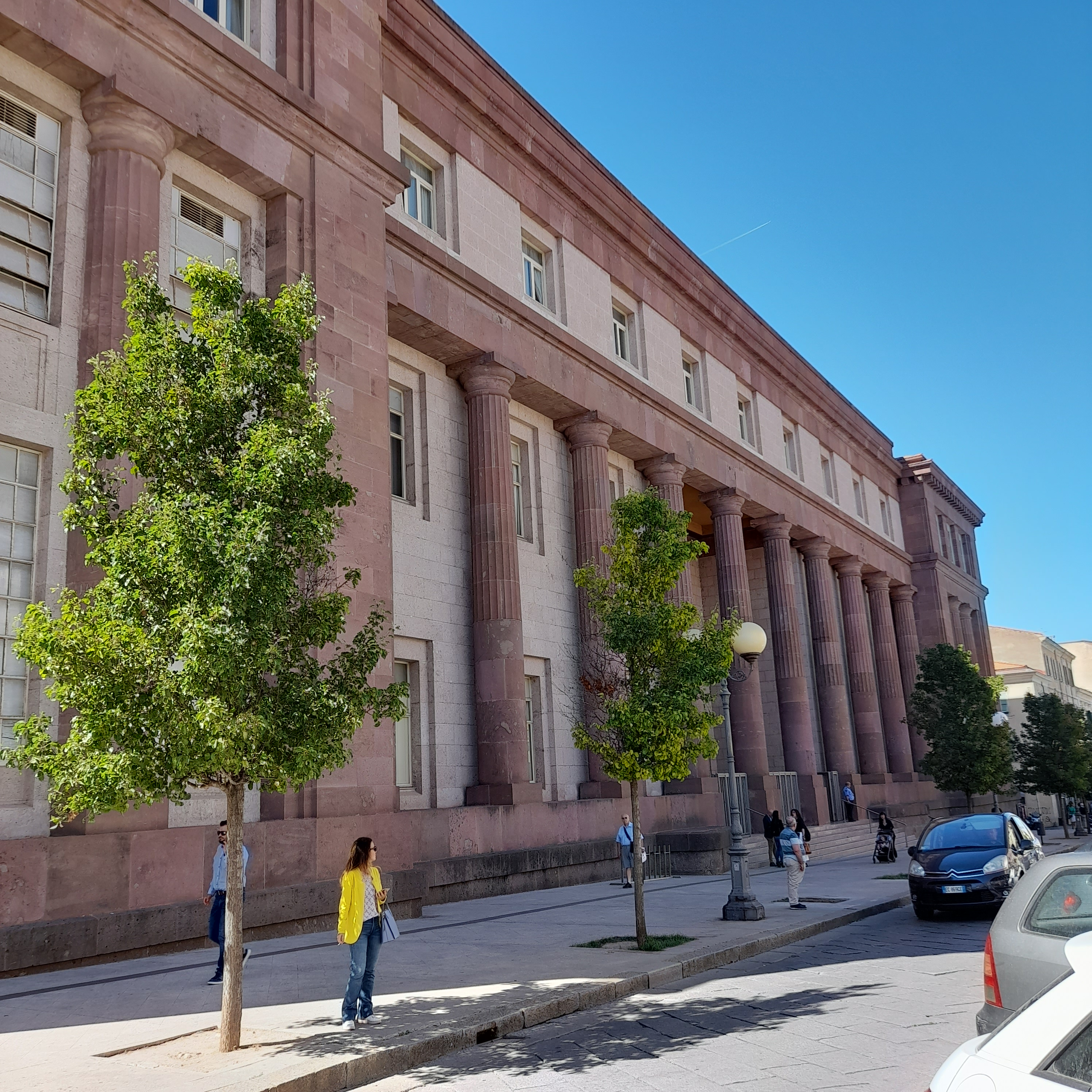
- Interactive map of the Sassari Courthouse area

General information
- Location: Sassari, Sardinia, Italy
- Coordinates: 40°43′24.24″N 8°33′56.16″E
- Construction started: 1929
- Completed: 1941
- Opening: 1938; 88 years ago

Design and construction
- Architects: Gino Benigni, Domenico Dettori

The Sassari Courthouse (Italian: Palazzo di Giustizia di Sassari, lit. 'Palace of Justice of Sassari') is a judicial complex located in Sassari, Italy.

== History ==
The courthouse is located on Via Roma and was designed by the Roman architect Gino Benigni and engineer Domenico Dettori. Construction works began in 1929, with the first phase completed in 1937. It was inaugurated in 1938, although construction continued until 1941.

== Description ==
The courthouse features classical references and monumental architecture. It was built adjacent to the former San Sebastiano prison, completed in 1871. The main façade on Via Roma features two projecting wings and is characterized by a grand order of red trachyte columns. The central section opens into the building's main entrance hall.

Inside, the courthouse houses valuable works of art, including a wall mosaic by Giuseppe Biasi depicting Peace and Justice, as well as bas-reliefs by Eugenio Tavolara and Gavino Tilocca.

== Sources ==
- F. Masala, ed. (2001). Architettura dall'unità d'Italia alla fine del '900 (PDF). Nuoro: Ilisso. Archived from the original on 2019-12-21.
- G. Altea; M. Magnani (2000). Pittura e scultura dal 1930 al 1960. Nuoro: Ilisso. pp. 121–129.
