= Gino =

Gino may refer to:

- Gino (given name)
- Gino (surname)
- Gino (film), a 1993 Australian film

== See also ==
- Geno (disambiguation)
- Gino's (disambiguation), various restaurants and fast-food chains
- Gina (disambiguation)
