= Geno (Super Mario RPG) =

Fictional character from Super Mario RPG

- Super Mario RPG character
- Geno as he appeared in the Super Mario RPG remake (2023)
- First game: Super Mario RPG (1996)
- Created by: Yuka Miyamoto
- Designed by: Kazuyuki Kurashima (concept); Hideo Minaba

In-universe information
- Alias: ♡♪!?
- Species: Star
- Fighting style: Physical/Magic attacks

Geno (Japanese: ジーノ, Hepburn: Jīno) (Note: The character's true name is revealed in-game as spelled by symbols "♡♪!?".) is a character who first appeared in Square's 1996 role-playing video game Super Mario RPG: Legend of the Seven Stars, which was published by Nintendo for the Super Nintendo Entertainment System. Geno is the name of a doll dressed in a blue hat and cape, which becomes inhabited by a being from the stars known as a Star Warrior. Geno is introduced as one of the game's party members who fights alongside Mario to stop the game's main antagonists, the Smithy gang.

In Super Mario RPG, Geno is able to use both physical attacks such as blasters as well as a wide array of magic attacks, with some commenting that the character is similar to wizard roles in other role-playing video games. Outside of Super Mario RPG, the character has made only small cameo appearances in other games, such as the original release of Mario & Luigi: Superstar Saga and as a costume for Mii Fighters in the crossover fighting game series Super Smash Bros..

Despite Geno's limited game appearances due to copyright issues, he received acclaim among both critics and fans of the game, with some stating he is the highlight of Super Mario RPG's story and describing him as having a cool and mysterious personality. A cult following for the character has made many fans petition for Geno's inclusion in future games, including as a playable fighter in future Super Smash Bros. titles.

== Character design ==
One of the four concept art pieces created and shown off by Kazuyuki Kurashima

Geno is a star warrior from a place he calls Star Road, which is said to grant wishes. Geno's true form is never revealed in any of his appearances but is said to be a star with a name represented with the symbols "♡♪!?", which no one can understand. When descending from Star Road to help Mario and his friend, he decides to inhabit the body of a wooden doll called Geno, owned by a Toad named Gaz. The star warrior decides to adopt the name of the doll. The design of the doll has a blue hat and cape, with two red strips poking through the hat made of wood shavings.

In battle, Geno has often been described as a "glass cannon" with high attack power and low defense. While in combat, Geno is able to swap out his hands for finger cannons or a blaster, which he can use to shoot beams or stars. Additionally, Geno has access to a range of magic attacks. With the move "Geno Whirl", he can send out large magical discs that can deal massive damage, and are even able to instantly kill a boss. With "Geno Flash", he can transform into a large cannon that is able to fire at all enemies in a battle. Finally, using the support ability "Geno Boost", he can increase the attack and defense stats of another party member.

Geno's appearance was initially conceptualized by Yuka Miyamoto. The rough draft was sent over to Kazuyuki Kurashima to be further developed. In 2020, Kurashima revealed initial concept art for Geno that depicts him with a knightly appearance; Kurashima gave him a taller stature, plate armor around the face and body, spiky hair, and a sword. A more finalized version of Geno was later designed by Hideo Minaba, featuring his hat and cape, although still brandishing a sword. In Minaba's artbook, he explained he had a harder time trying to adapt Geno into the Mario world compared to the character Mallow, in part due to wanting to balance Mario's cuteness with a cool character. Minaba explained that the reason he chose to go with a doll design was down to dolls being able to perform actions that humans can't such as twisting body parts and attacking together, which aligned closer with the role-playing elements of the game. According to Kurashima, Geno's design was finalized by both Minaba and Miyamoto.

== Appearances ==
=== Main appearances ===
Geno's first appearance is in 1996's Super Mario RPG: Legend of the Seven Stars as one of the game's five party members. As a guardian and star warrior of the Star Road, he is sent to the Mushroom Kingdom by a "higher authority" to fix the Star Road and restore its powers to grant wishes after it was destroyed by the game's main antagonists, the Smithy Gang. Upon arriving in the settlement of Rose Town, he begins to inhabit a wooden puppet named Geno; choosing him as he believes him to be the strongest of the dolls in the room. Mario and his partner Mallow follow the puppet into the nearby Forest Maze to which he gives the player indirect help as to where to go. At the end of the Forest Maze, Geno faces off against Bowyer, a member of the Smithy Gang. After Mario saves Geno from one of Bowyer's attacks, the pair and Mallow defeat Bowyer to claim his Star Piece, the game's main collectable which is key to fixing Star Road. After introducing himself to Mario and Mallow, Geno decides to team up with the pair in order to search for the remaining Star Pieces in order to fix the Star Road. At the end of the game, Geno and the other party members confront Smithy in his lair. After defeating Smithy, Geno decides to return to Star Road and takes the Star Pieces with him. Upon leaving, all that remains in his place is the now uninhabited puppet.

Geno retains the same role in the 2023 remake Super Mario RPG. In the remake, he gains a new weapon that is only available in the postgame. A new mechanic was introduced called "Triple Moves" which allows all party members in battle to use a powerful attack. An example of this is the move "Star Riders", which is an attack performed by Geno, Mario and Mallow that does significant damage to one enemy at a time. Another new feature added to the remake is a scrapbook where events from the game are logged by Geno, as well as Mallow.

=== Other appearances ===
Geno's next appearance is in 2003's Mario & Luigi: Superstar Saga in which Geno makes a cameo in a mini-game where he reads out the instructions of the game to the player. This cameo was later removed in the game's 2017 remake.

In 2015, Geno's hat and costume were added as paid downloadable content for Super Smash Bros. for Nintendo 3DS and Wii U; that according to Super Smash Bros. series director Masahiro Sakurai was added due to an agreement reached between Square Enix and Nintendo. The costume is a customization option for the Mii Gunner playable fighter, which depicts one of Geno's arm cannons out for the player to fire. This Mii costume was later reintroduced as DLC in 2020 for Super Smash Bros. Ultimate alongside other Mii costumes resembling characters from Final Fantasy VII. To commemorate the costume, as well as Sephiroth's appearance as a playable fighter, Sakurai made a tweet referencing a boss fight in Super Mario RPG. Alongside this, Geno also appears as a collectable "Spirit" which the player can use to aid in matches. In November 2023, a free limited time background was added to Tetris 99 in promotion of the Super Mario RPG remake, which featured promotional art of Geno alongside Mario, Princess Peach, Bowser and Mallow.

Geno also made an appearance in the Japanese manga adaptation of the Mario franchise, Super Mario-kun.

== Critical reception ==
Since appearing in Super Mario RPG, Geno has received largely positive reception from critics, with Ozzie Mejia of Shacknews describing Geno as being the game's standout character. Furthermore, Mejia mentioned how Geno manages to flesh out the story and grants the player higher stakes, mentioning that Geno's departure is "one of the game's most emotional moments". TheGamer's Gary Kay ranked Geno as the best character in the game, stating that he is a fun character to play and that the lore he brings is "a treat" every time he appears. VentureBeat's Mike Minotti believed that Geno's presence gave the wider Mario franchise a character that "it often lacks", adding that he was taken seriously and was "noble and heroic in a sincere way". Minotti stated that he hoped for the return of the character to the franchise and for the character to appear in the Super Smash Bros. series. 4Gamer.net's Okdos Kumada felt that the character was both cool and had a shroud of mystery around him, adding that the way the character wrote could make the player "feel the weight of the words" spoken by the character. Yui, another writer for 4Gamer.net, became excited upon seeing Geno in the announcement trailer of the Super Mario RPG remake, describing Geno as a hero and a character that "captured the hearts" of those who played the original version. Conversely, Pete Davison of MoeGamer found Geno to be an uninteresting and unmemorable character, believing that he does not get many memorable moments or dialogue and is just a means of explaining the plot of the game; with Davison stating he expected more from Geno. However, Davison gave praise to Geno's combat style, citing his various projectiles as cool.

Similar to critics, Geno received positive reception from fans and has gained a cult following. In an interview with Retro Gamer, Super Mario RPG co-director Chihiro Fujioka stated he was aware of Geno's popularity within the game's fandom but was not sure as to why, speculating it may be due to the "doll that's come to life" aspect of the character. During an interview with IGN in 2013, RPG's other co-director Yoshihiko Maekawa and AlphaDream producer Akira Ohtani dwelled on the possibility of bringing back characters like Geno and Mallow in future games, specifically in the Mario & Luigi series. Furthermore they added that even if the characters would not have major roles, they could "provide a view of these characters for fans who really want to see one". In a brief interview with Shacknews in 2021, fans of the character spoke about how Geno had "great visual design", "cool backstory" and "unique abilities" as reasons for why they adored Geno, with one stating "we crazy fans are still wanting more of him after 25 years". When interviewed about Super Mario RPG, Japanese Pro Wrestler Hiromu Takahashi mentioned that Geno was his favorite character and really liked the scene where the Geno puppet becomes inhabited by the celestial star warrior. Takahashi added that Geno was usually in his party when playing the game and expressed interest in seeing Geno's true form sometime in the future.

As a result of Geno's popularity, fans of the character have long requested for Geno to appear as a playable fighter in the Super Smash Bros. series. In 2019, there was a petition on Change.org, named Operation Starfall, that laid out three goals for Nintendo and Square Enix; create a remake/sequel for Super Mario RPG, have both Geno and Mallow return in future Mario installments, and have Geno appear in the Super Smash Bros. series. In an interview with the Nintendo-focused magazine Nintendo Dream, the series' creator Masahiro Sakurai spoke about how he's wanted to add Geno to the series as far back as Super Smash Bros. Brawl, adding that he felt Geno would "fit absolutely perfectly into Smash". However he claimed that this idea never materialized, without disclosing why. Geno did ultimately make it into the series as a costume for the Mii Fighters, though Polygon added that this likely was a "bittersweet end" for the character appearing in these games properly for fans. In an article on VG247, Nadia Oxford analyzed the fan demand for Geno in Smash; detailing that she believed it was due to fans seeing Geno as having a cool personality, having great moveset potential and fans seeing Super Mario RPG as being their gateway into the role-playing video game genre. In the wake of the announcement of the Super Mario RPG remake, Liam Ferguson of Game Rant believed that the remake would give Geno the perfect opportunity to appear in a future Super Smash Bros. title, mentioning that the remake could "kindle a new generation's passion for the character".

Fans have expressed their appreciation for Geno, including creating art of the character on social media platforms such as Pinterest, Tumblr and Twitter. In August 2011, a fan-made Geno figure was released by Fangamer, following a partnering between the company and figurine maker Camille Young. In October 2020, Twitter user @Thinginator90 started to draw the character once per day "until the character made into Super Smash Bros". At nearly 1,000 drawings, @Thinginator90 stated he would end his appreciation drawings upon the release of the Super Mario RPG remake following its June 2023 Nintendo Direct reveal.
