= Cam's Ham =

Restaurant in Huntington, West Virginia, US

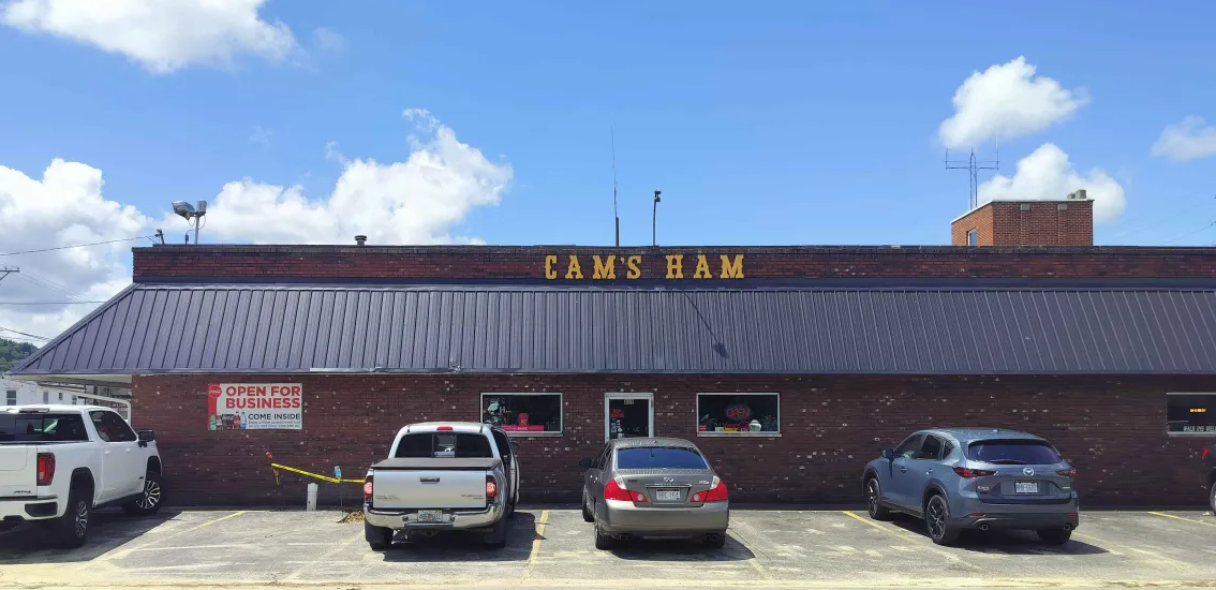
- Cam's Ham in 2024

Restaurant information
- Established: 1957
- Previous owner: Cambell Hage (founder)
- Location: 809 1st St, Huntington, West Virginia 25701, US
- Coordinates: 38°24′44.352″N 82°27′21.276″W
- Website: Official Website

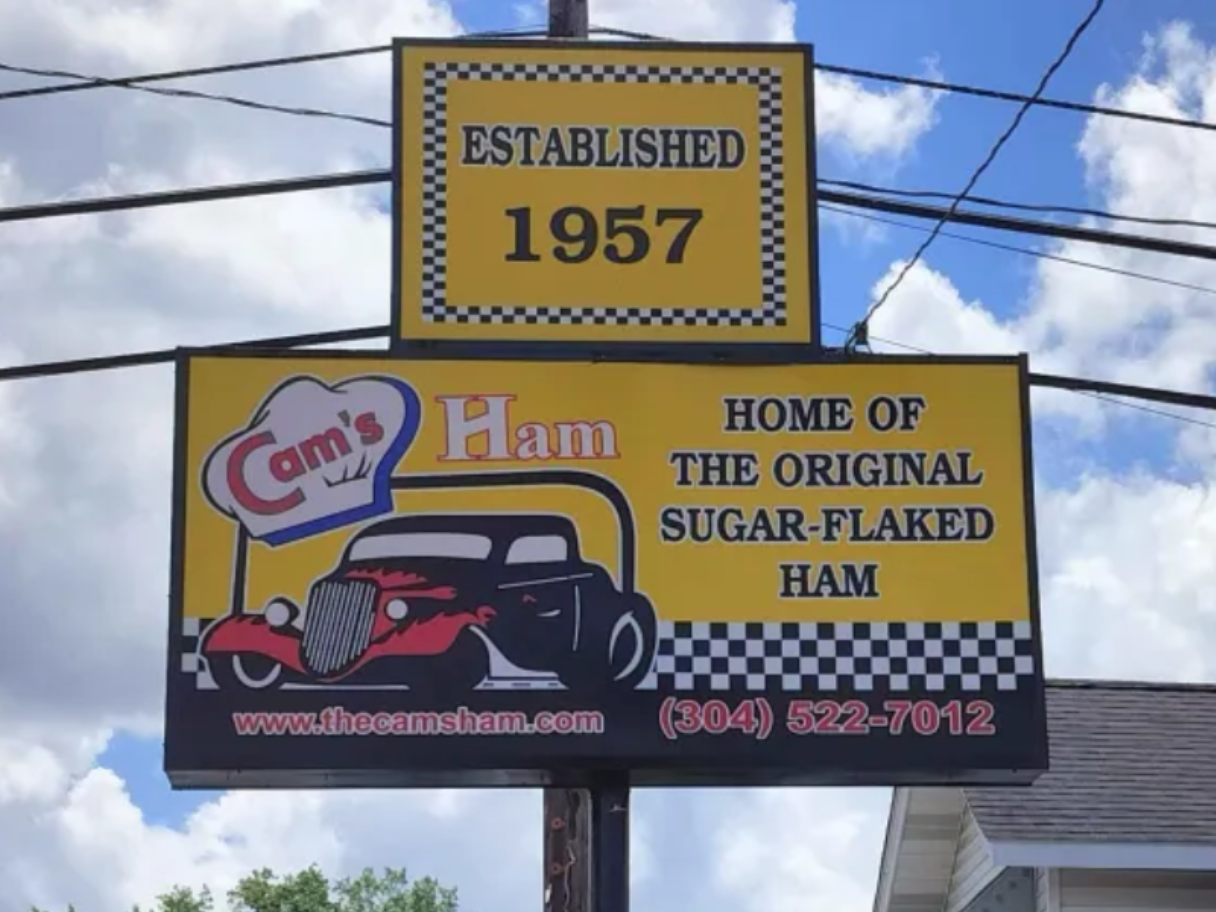
Cam's Ham street sign in 2024

Cam's Ham is a restaurant located in Huntington, West Virginia, US. Known as the Home of the Original Sugar-Flaked Ham, Cam's Ham was listed on the Food Network's 50 States 50 Sandwiches list as having the best sandwich in West Virginia.

The restaurant is named after its founder Cambell "Cam" Hage, who founded Cam's Ham in 1957 along the rails of Huntington Station. As one of the oldest running restaurants in West Virginia, the restaurant has maintained their old-fashioned diner aesthetic while also displaying a collection of Coca-Cola and NASCAR memorabilia.

== The Original Sugar-Flaked Ham Sandwich ==
90% of all orders from Cam's Ham are The Cam's Original Sugar Flaked Ham Sandwich, which is made of thin flakes of lean ham stacked on a toasted Grecian bun and garnished with lettuce and a sweet-based secret sauce.

=== Recognition ===
- The Best Ham Sandwich in America - Only In Your State
- West Virginia's Best Sandwich - Food Network
- West Virginia's Best Sandwich - The Daily Meal
