= Huntington station (Baltimore and Ohio Railroad) =

- Baltimore and Ohio Railroad Depot
- U.S. National Register of Historic Places
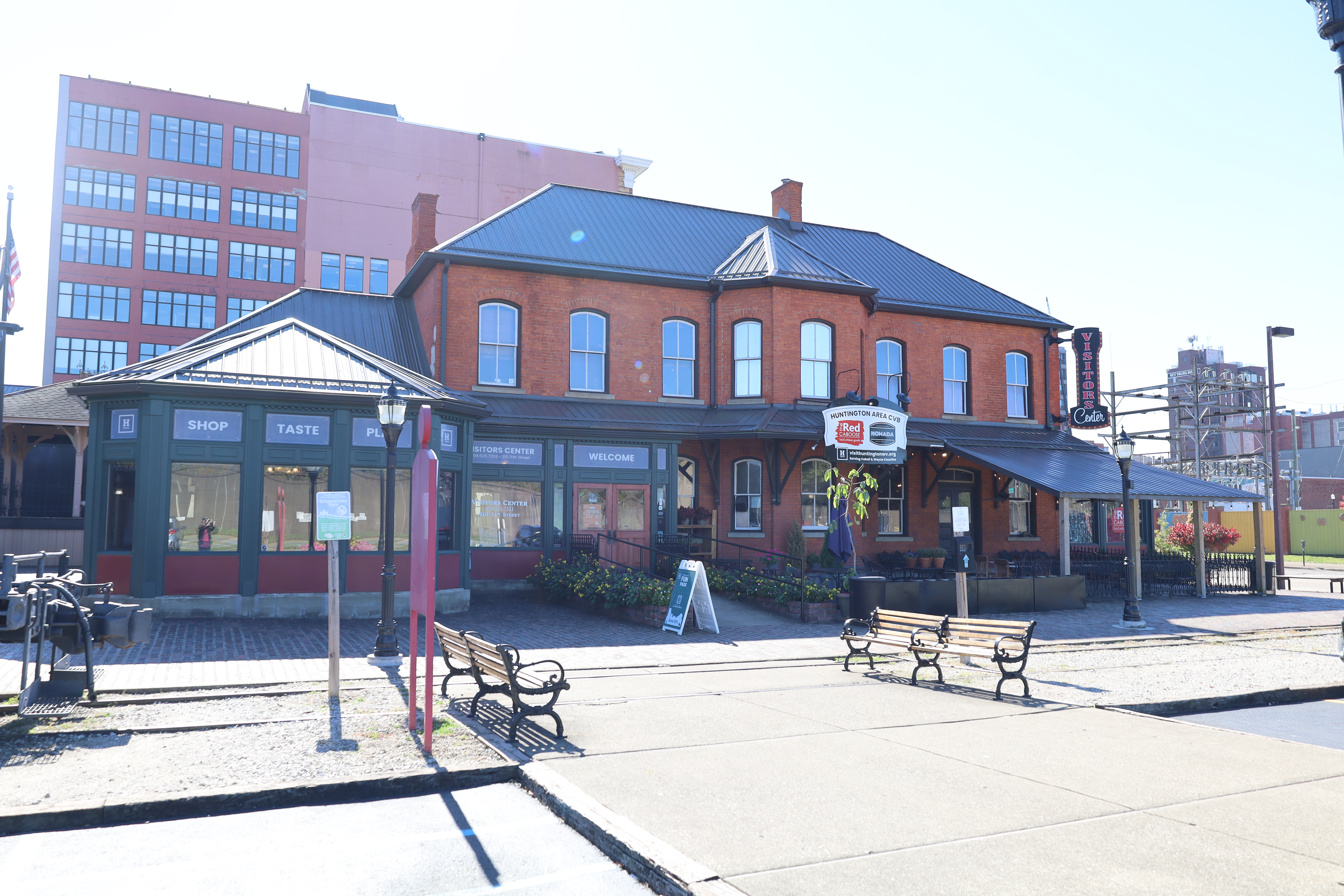
- The station in 2023

- Location within West Virginia Location within the United States
- Location: 1100 block of 2nd Ave., Huntington, West Virginia
- Coordinates: 38°25′24″N 82°26′33″W
- Area: 0.5 acres (0.20 ha)
- Built: 1887
- NRHP reference No.: 73001897
- Added to NRHP: October 30, 1973

Huntington station, also known as Heritage Station, is a historic railroad depot located at Huntington, Cabell County, West Virginia.

== History ==
It was built in 1887, by the Huntington and Big Sandy Railroad, later the Baltimore and Ohio Railroad. The former passenger station is two stories and constructed of brick with a slate roof and two chimneys. The former baggage section to the east is one story. The front facade of the former passenger station features a bay window extending from the basement to the roof and dividing it into two sections. At the rear of the passenger station is the former freighthouse. The freighthouse is a brick building with a slate roof completed in 1890, and expanded in 1897, 1911, and 1916.

It was listed on the National Register of Historic Places in 1973 as the Baltimore and Ohio Railroad Depot.

=== Present Day ===
The complex includes an original steam engine with a "Pullman" train car, an outdoor performance area, and a building that used to house one of Huntington's first banks—which was the easternmost bank robbed by the James-Younger Gang. Heritage Station was turned into a shopping center called "Heritage Village" during the 1970s. For decades, the station sat hidden and virtually unused just two blocks from the city center, until Create Huntington got involved in 2006. Today, Heritage Station is an artisan retail complex, with locally owned shops, and home to public events like the annual Diamond Teeth Mary Blues Festival, named for the blues singer born in the town.

In 2025 Nomada Bakery, located in Heritage station, was ranked as the top cake shop in the United States by USA Today.

== Gallery ==
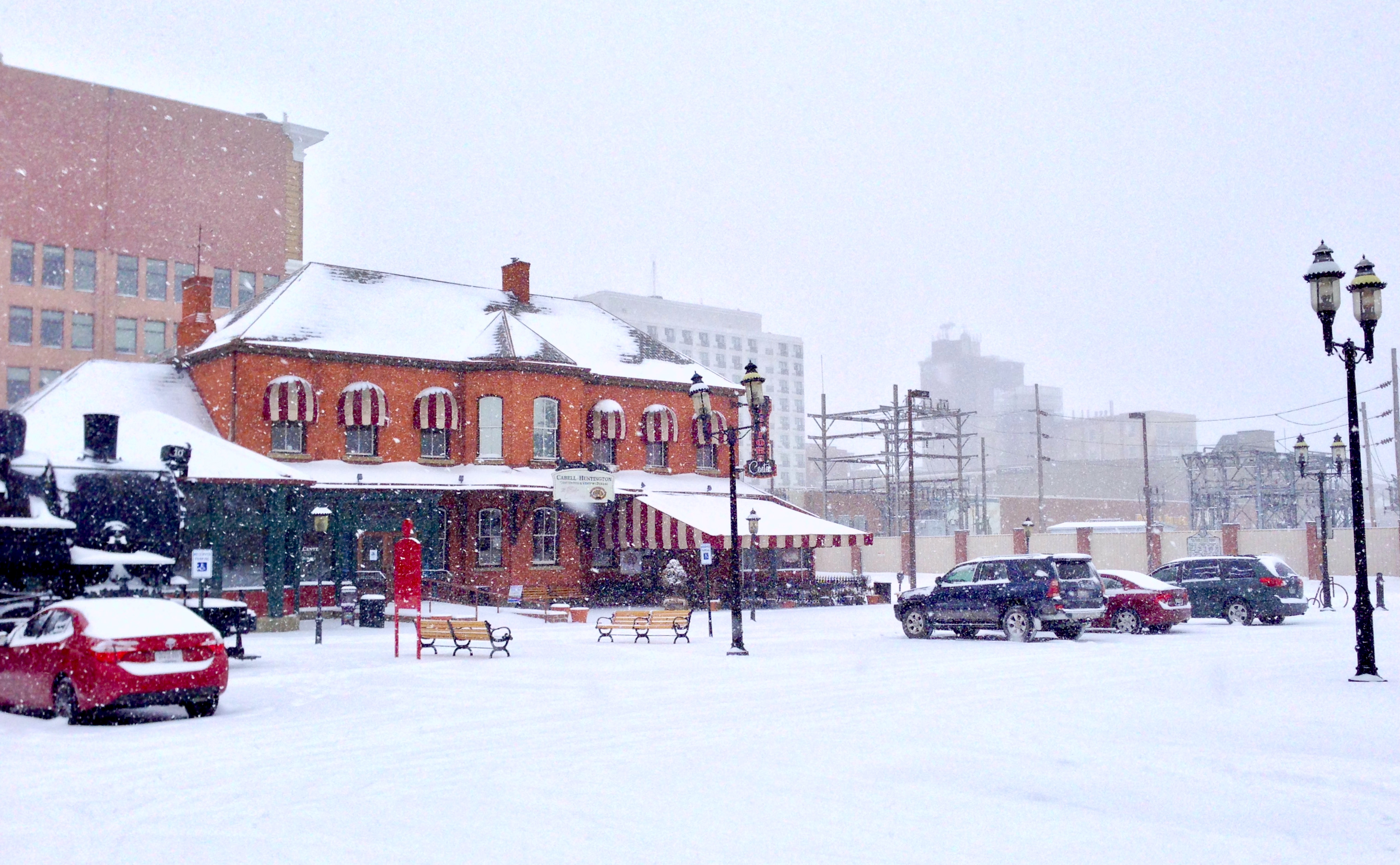
The station in winter in 2015

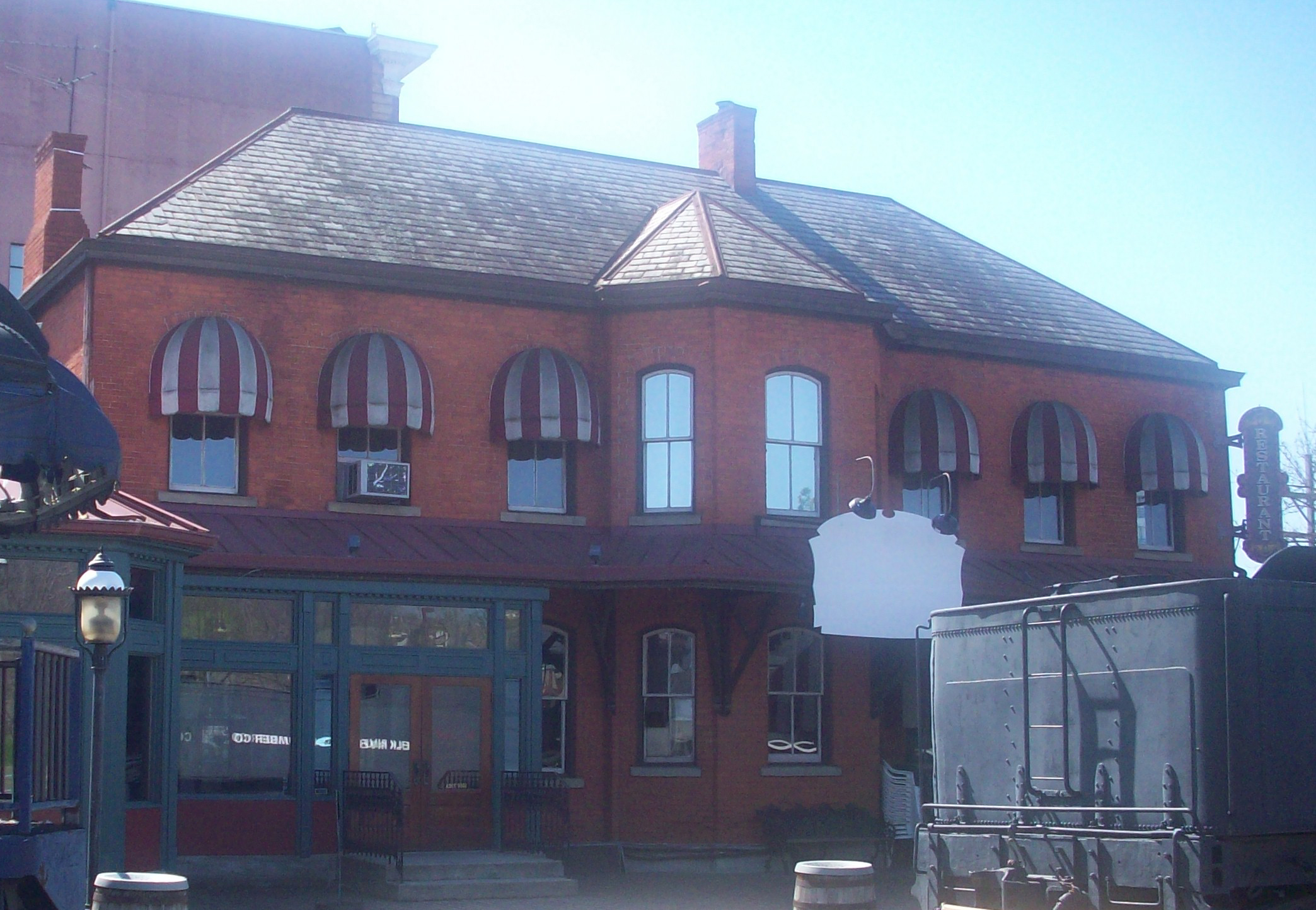
Front view in 2009

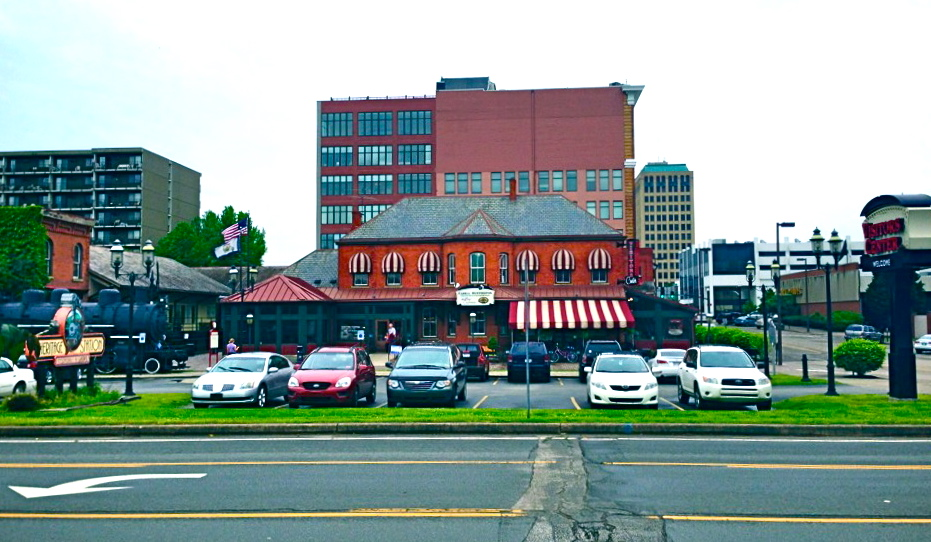
Front view in 2013

Right side view in 2015

A railroad observation car in 2015

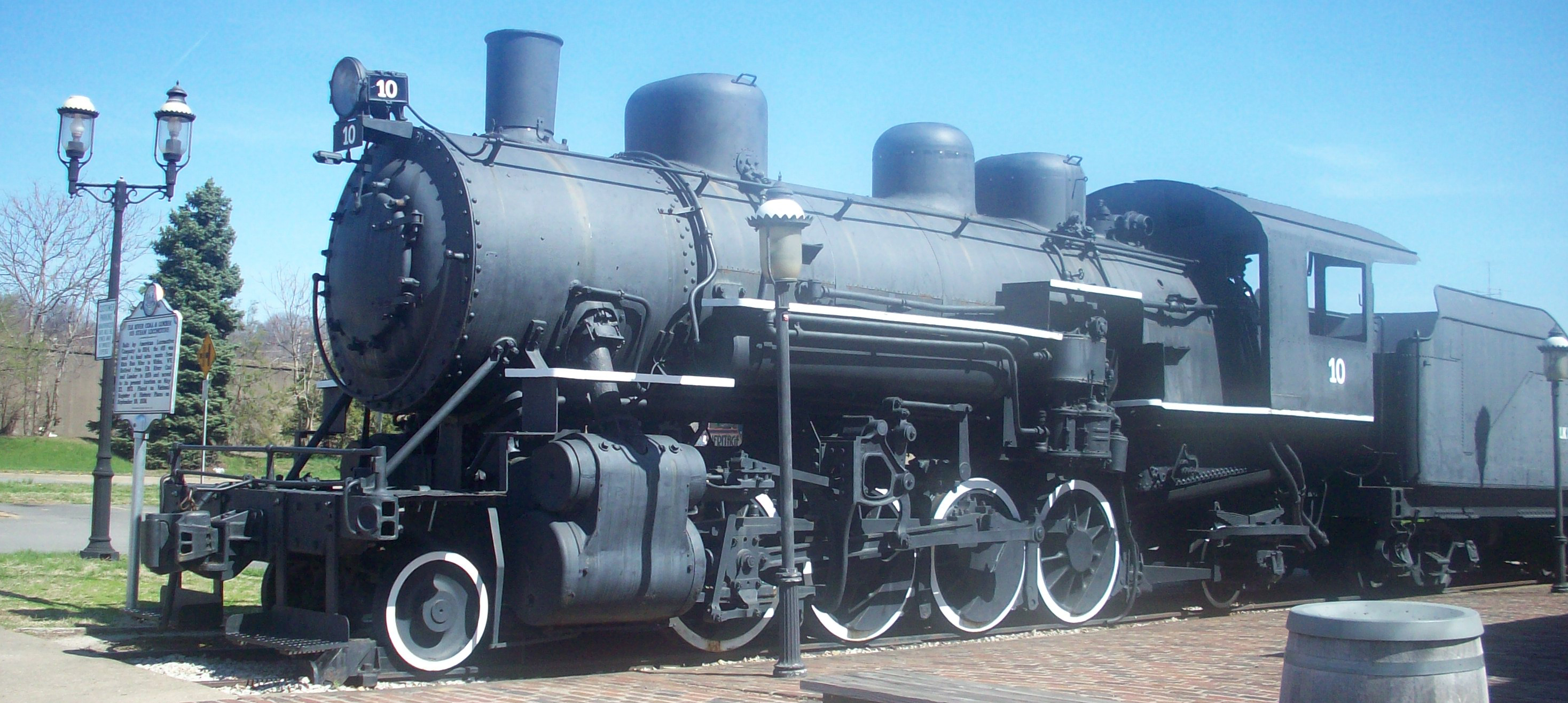
The Elk River Coal and Lumber Company No. 10 in 2009

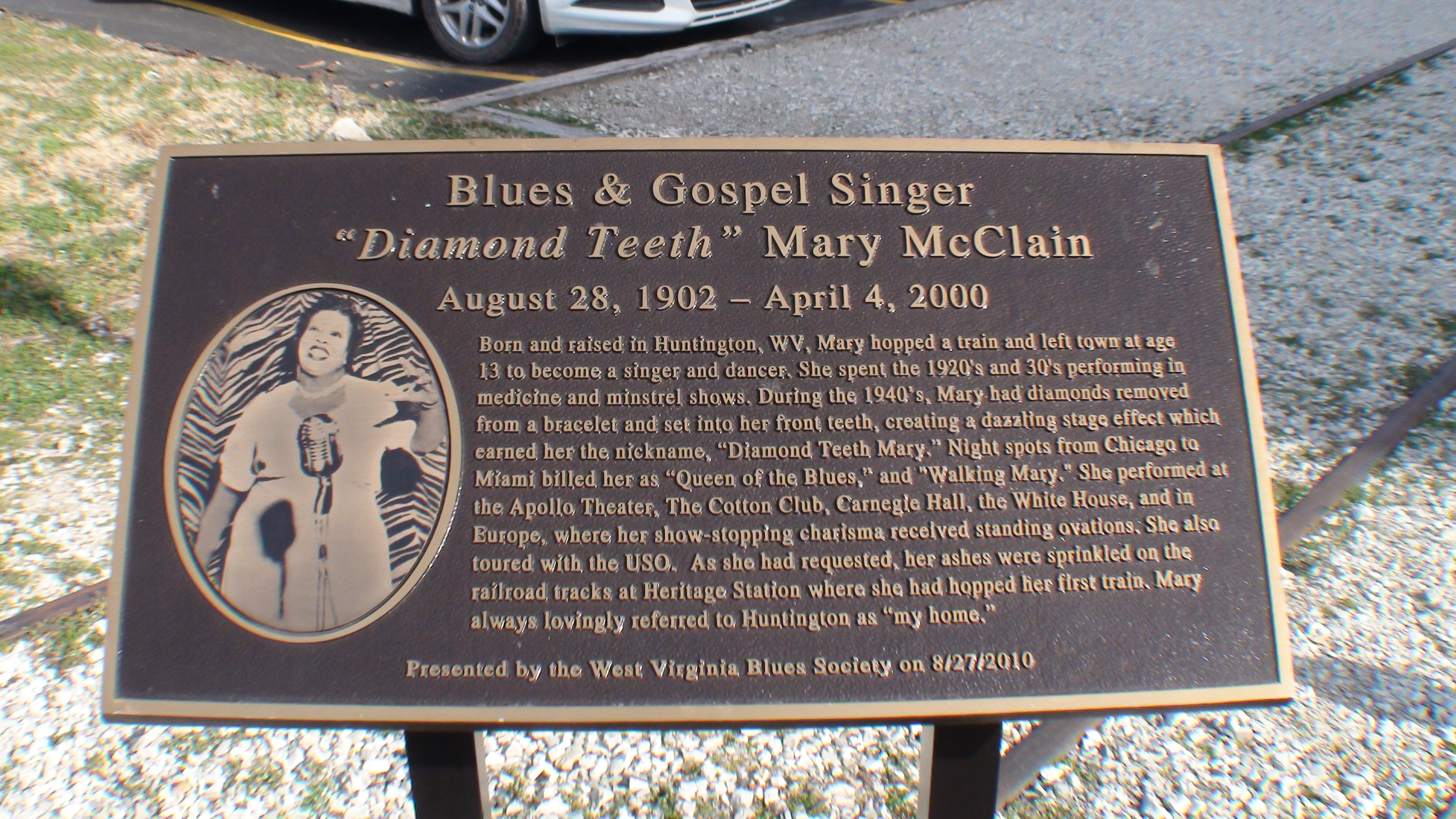
A Diamond Teeth Mary marker in 2016

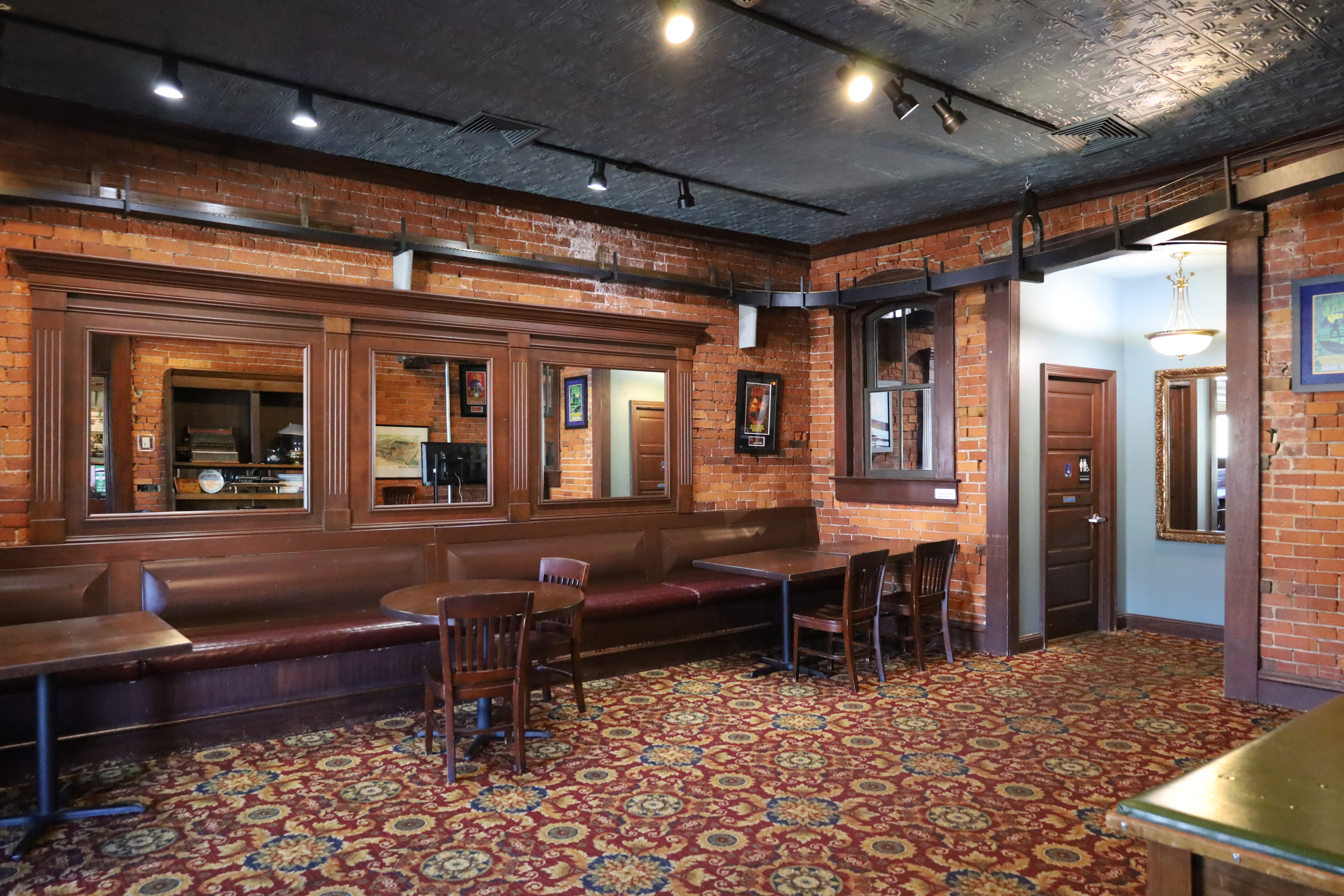
Interior in 2023

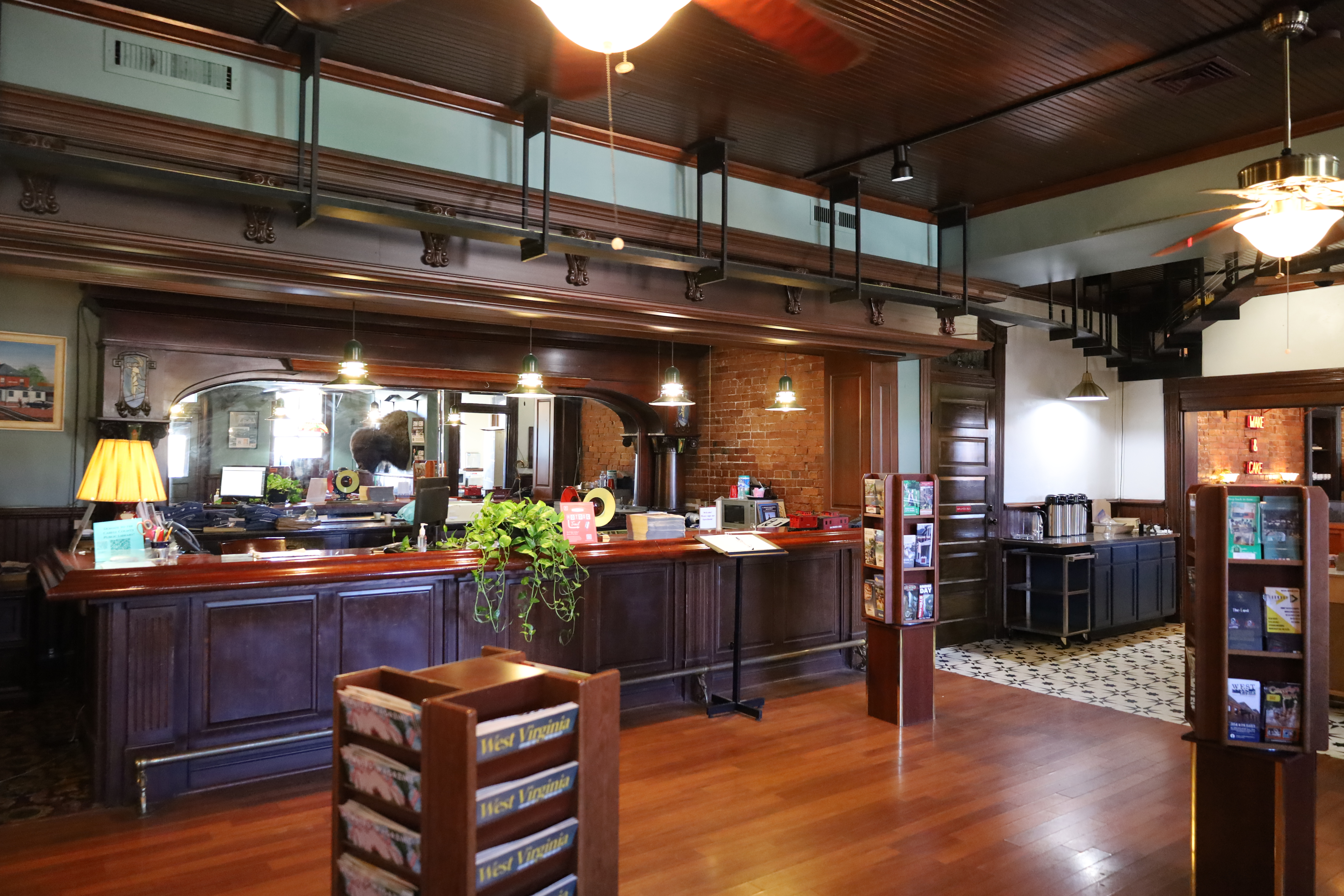
Main entrance interior in 2023

== See also ==
- National Register of Historic Places listings in Cabell County, West Virginia

Preceding station	Baltimore and Ohio Railroad	Following station
West Huntington toward Kenova	Kenova – Wheeling	Guyandotte toward Wheeling
