= Nomada Bakery =

Bakery in Huntington, West Virginia, USA

- Interactive map of Nomada Bakery

Restaurant information
- Established: 2019
- Food type: Bakery
- Location: Huntington, Cabell, West Virginia, USA
- Coordinates: 38°25′24″N 82°26′33″W
- Website: www.nomadabakery.com

Nomada Bakery is a bakery located in the Heritage Station, in Huntington, West Virginia.

== History ==
Nomada Bakery and Eatery was founded by Ariel Barcenas and Shawn Schulenberg in Huntington, West Virginia. Originally from Panama, Barcenas moved to the U.S. after studying film in Argentina and working in journalism. The couple opened Nomada in a former bakery space in Heritage Station shortly before the COVID-19 lockdown in 2020.

== Recognition ==
Year	Title	Organization	Note
2025	Best Cake Shop in the United States	USA Today	
2026	Best Cake Shop in the United States	USA Today	
2026	Best Bakery in West Virginia	Tasting Table	
