= Gino Benigni =

Italian architect (1913–1984)

- Born: 23 July 1889; Soriano nel Cimino, Province of Rome, Kingdom of Italy
- Died: 1948 (aged 58–59); Rome, Italy
- Education: Accademia di Belle Arti di Roma
- Occupation: Architect

Gino Benigni (23 July 1889 – 1948) was an Italian architect.

== Life and career ==
Born in Soriano nel Cimino on 23 July 1889, Benigni was one of the founders of the Italian Architects Federation in 1905. After earning his diploma as a professor of architectural drawing in 1909 from the Higher Institute of Fine Arts in Rome, he continued to specialize in technical architecture and participated in various courses and restoration activities. In 1912, he won a scholarship in architecture at the Royal Academy of San Luca with a project for a thermal spa.

Between 1910 and 1925, he collaborated with architect Giulio Magni and engineer Quadrio Pirani, contributing to numerous projects in Rome, including residential neighborhoods and villas. He was a member of the Building Commission of the Rome Governorship from 1929 to 1933 and, during the 1940s, worked as an architect at the technical office of INCIS.

Among the projects and works carried out in Rome are: the gates of the quadripartite portico of the Basilica of Saint Paul Outside the Walls (1913–26), the houses of the Roman Institute for the Homes of State Employees (IRCIS) on Via Ferrari and via Tagliamento (1920–25, in collaboration with Quadrio Pirani), the houses of the cooperative "La Previdenza" on Via Savoia (1921–24, with Giuseppe Quaroni), the villas of the cooperatives "Il Progresso" and "Latina I" in Villa Fiorelli and Porta Latina (1922–23, with Quadrio Pirani), the Villa Pacetti in Via delle Mura Aurelie (1922–23), the Zelli-Jacobuzzi and Batacchi apartment buildings in Via Settembrini (1923–25), the building of the Tirrena Telephone Company (1925–26, with Giuseppe Quaroni), the Pellicciotti building in Via Bertoloni (1925–26), the church of Santa Maria Immacolata in Via Taranto (1926–30, with engineer Mirko Antonelli).

Outside Rome, notable works include the Monfalcone Cathedral (1922–26, with Francesco Leoni), the civil hospital of Teramo (1926–30), the Sassari Courthouse and the Cagliari Courthouse (1928–41, in collaboration with engineer Domenico Dettori).

== Sources ==
- Tommaso Dore (1997). L'opera dell'architetto Gino Benigni (1889-1948). Rome: La Sapienza University of Rome.
- Paolo Marconi; Angela Cipriani; Enrico Valeriani (1974). I disegni di architettura dell'Archivio Storico dell'Accademia di San Luca. Rome.
- Elisabetta Reale; Daniela Pesce; Margherita Guccione, eds. (2007). Guida agli archivi di architettura a Roma e nel Lazio da Roma capitale al secondo dopoguerra. Rome: Gangemi. p. 76.
