= Gino Cavicchioli =

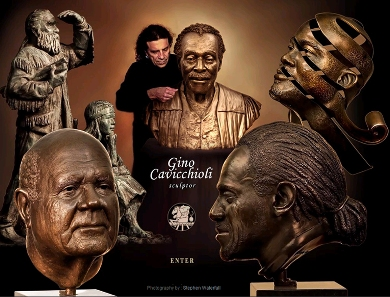
- Born: Gino Cavicchioli
- Known for: Sculptor
- Movement: Realism

Gino Cavicchioli (born March 9, 1957) was born in Australia and is a Canadian sculptor/artist based in Hamilton, Ontario, Canada. Having spent most of his formative years in Rome, Italy, he cites the work of the Italian Renaissance as the earliest influence of his style.

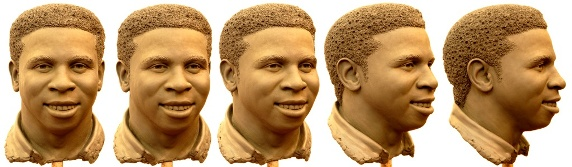
Michael Pinball Clemons Portrait Bust Inductees 2008

Cavicchioli is currently the official sculptor for the Canadian Football Hall of Fame which houses a large selection of his portrait busts that spans almost ten years. To the left of this paragraph is the portrait bust of football player Pinball Clemons created by Cavicchioli for the Canadian Football Hall of Fame Induction 2008. Pinball is the most famous former player of the Toronto Argonauts and also one of the most popular professional athletes in the history of Toronto.

Although not a football player himself, Cavicchioli has great respect for the game and especially the players. "Football is just one more avenue that we may choose to excel in, it doesn't matter what we chose as long as we love and give it our total best," he says. Each portrait bust he sculpts begins abstractly in clay, then builds up into a realistic vision of the person. Once he feels he has captured an accurate likeness, the final sculpture is cast in bronze.

A bronze sculpture honouring Margaret and Charles Juravinski was unveiled in November 2008 at the Juravinski Cancer Centre in Hamilton to commemorate the couple's $43 million donation to various health care projects across the city in 2006. It was placed in the lobby of the new Juravinski Hospital and Cancer Care Centre in 2012.
