= Gino's Pizza and Spaghetti =

Restaurant chain in West Virginia

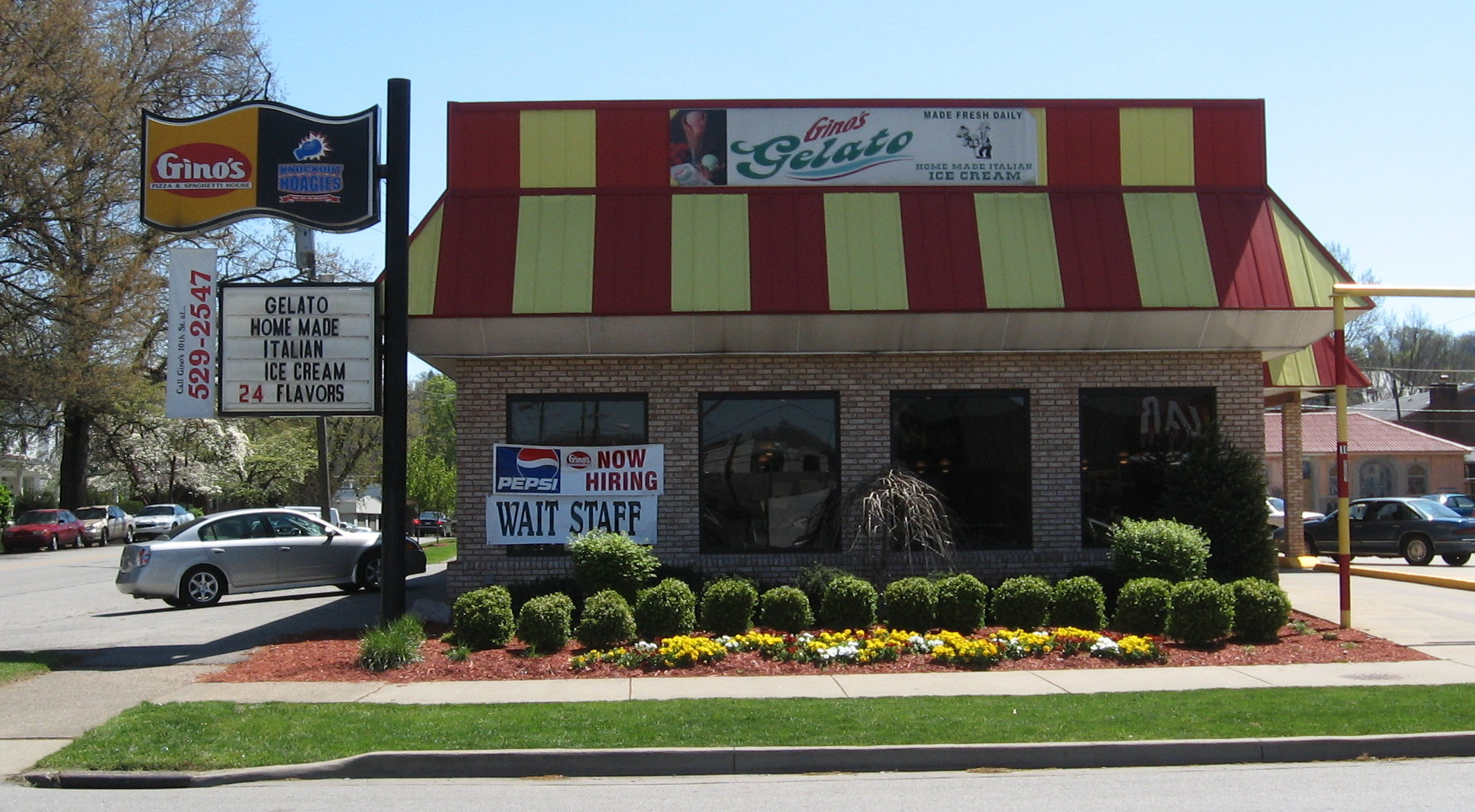
- Gino's location in Huntington, West Virginia
- Industry: Restaurants
- Genre: Casual
- Founded: 1961; 65 years ago
- Headquarters: Nitro, West Virginia, U.S.
- Number of locations: 40+ across West Virginia
- Area served: United States
- Products: Pizza, spaghetti, chicken wings, sandwiches
- Website: ginospizza.com

Gino's Pizza and Spaghetti is a pizzeria chain with more than 40 locations in the U.S. state of West Virginia.

== History ==
Gino's Pizza and Spaghetti was founded by Kenney Grant, who established the first location in Huntington, West Virginia on April 1, 1961. Prior to opening the restaurant, Grant had traveled to Norwood, Ohio, where he completed a two-week apprenticeship to learn the art of pizza dough preparation.

The original Gino's Pizza is still standing in Huntington, West Virginia, located on 5th Avenue across the street from the Veterans Memorial Soccer Complex. This location features the original scoreboard from Fairfield Stadium.

In 2026, there are over 50 locations, some of which are shared with Tudor's Biscuit World.

== See also ==
- List of pizza chains of the United States
