= List of hospitals in West Virginia =

This is a list of hospitals in West Virginia (U.S. state), sorted by hospital name.

- Autism Services Center - Huntington, West Virginia (Cabell County)
- Beckley Appalachian Regional Hospital - Beckley (Raleigh County)
- Bluefield Regional Medical Center ER (WVU) - Bluefield (Mercer County)
- Boone Memorial Hospital - Madison (Boone County)
- Braxton County Memorial Hospital (WVU) - Gassaway (Braxton County)
- Broaddus Hospital - Philippi (Barbour County)

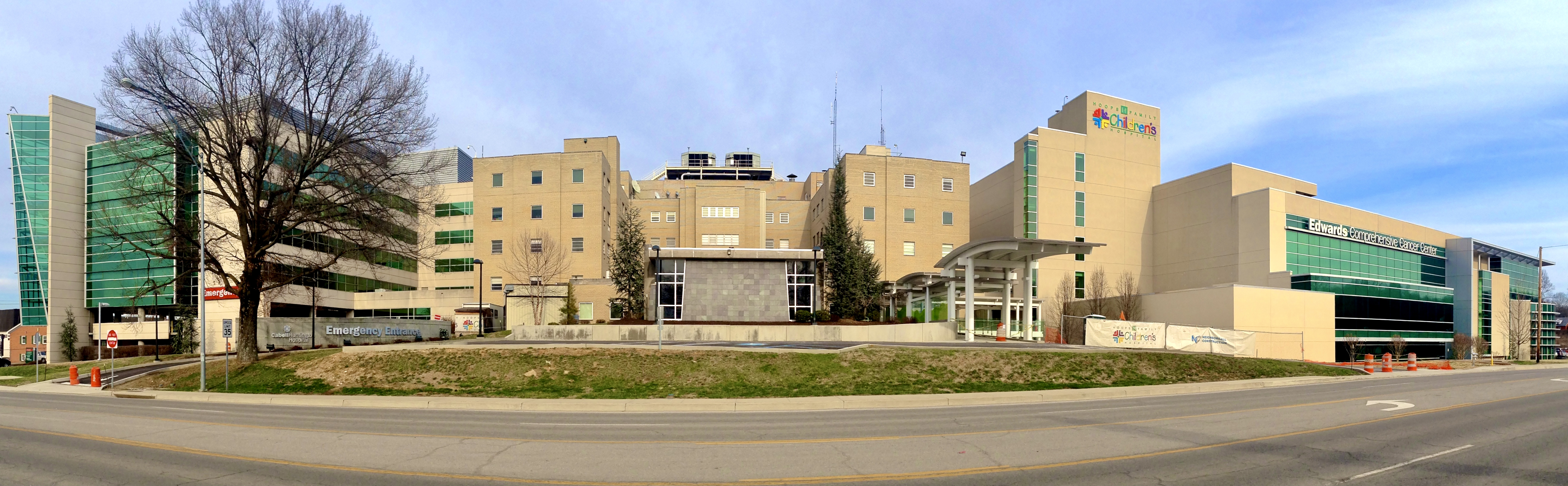
Cabell Huntington Hospital located in Huntington, West Virginia (2014)

- Cabell Huntington Hospital - Huntington (Cabell and Wayne counties)
- Camden Clark Medical Center - Parkersburg (Wood County)
- Charleston Area Medical Center - Charleston (Kanawha County), unless otherwise indicated
  - CAMC General Division
  - CAMC Memorial Division
  - CAMC Teays Valley Hospital – Teays Valley (postal address Hurricane) (Putnam County

Teays Valley Cancer Center (Hurricane WV) [ Putnam County ] Teays Valley Primary Care (Hurricane WV) Putnam County

  - CAMC Women and Children's Hospital
- City Hospital - Martinsburg (Berkeley County)
- Davis Memorial Hospital - Elkins (Randolph County)
- Fairmont Medical Center - Fairmont (Marion County)
- Grafton City Hospital - Grafton (Taylor County)
- Grant Memorial Hospital - Petersburg (Grant County)
- Greenbrier Valley Medical Center - Ronceverte (Greenbrier County)
- Hampshire Memorial Hospital - Romney (Hampshire County)
- HealthSouth Rehabilitation Hospital - Huntington (Cabell and Wayne counties)
- Highland Hospital - Charleston (Kanawha County)
- Highland-Clarksburg Hospital - Clarksburg (Harrison County)
- Hoops Family Children's Hospital - Huntington
- Jackson General Hospital - Ripley (Jackson County)
- Jefferson Memorial Hospital - Ranson (Jefferson County)
- Logan Regional Medical Center - Logan (Logan County)
- Man Appalachian Regional Hospital (closed) - Man (Logan County)
- Marmet Hospital for Crippled Children (closed) - Marmet (Kanawha County)
- Mildred Mitchell-Bateman Hospital - Huntington
- Minnie Hamilton Health Center - Grantsville (Calhoun County)
- Mon Health Medical Center - Morgantown (Monongalia County)
- Montgomery General Hospital - Montgomery (Fayette and Kanawha counties)
- Ohio Valley Medical Center - Wheeling (Marshall and Ohio counties)
- Plateau Medical Center - Oak Hill (Fayette County)
- Pleasant Valley Hospital - Point Pleasant (Mason County)
- Pocahontas Memorial Hospital - Buckeye (Pocahontas County)
- Potomac Valley Hospital - Keyser, West Virginia
- Preston Memorial Hospital - Kingwood (Preston County)
- Princeton Community Hospital - Princeton (Mercer County)
- Raleigh General Hospital - Beckley (Raleigh County)
- Reynolds Memorial Hospital - Glen Dale (Marshall County)
- Richwood Area Community Hospital (closed) - Richwood (Nicholas County)

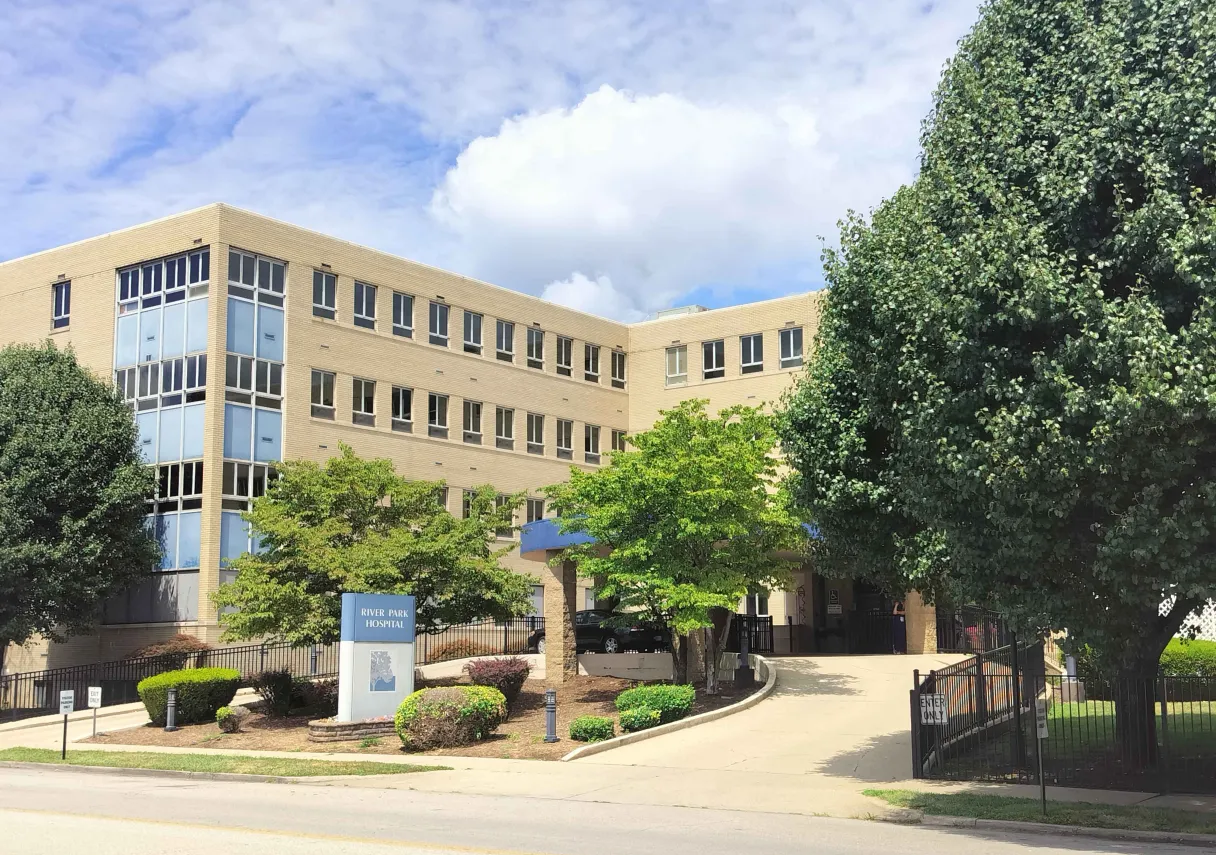
River Park Hospital in 2024.

- River Park Hospital - Huntington (Cabell and Wayne counties)
- Roane General Hospital - Spencer (Roane County)
- St. Francis Hospital - Charleston (Kanawha County)
- St. Joseph's Hospital - Buckhannon (Upshur County)
- St. Joseph's Hospital (closed) - Parkersburg (Wood County)

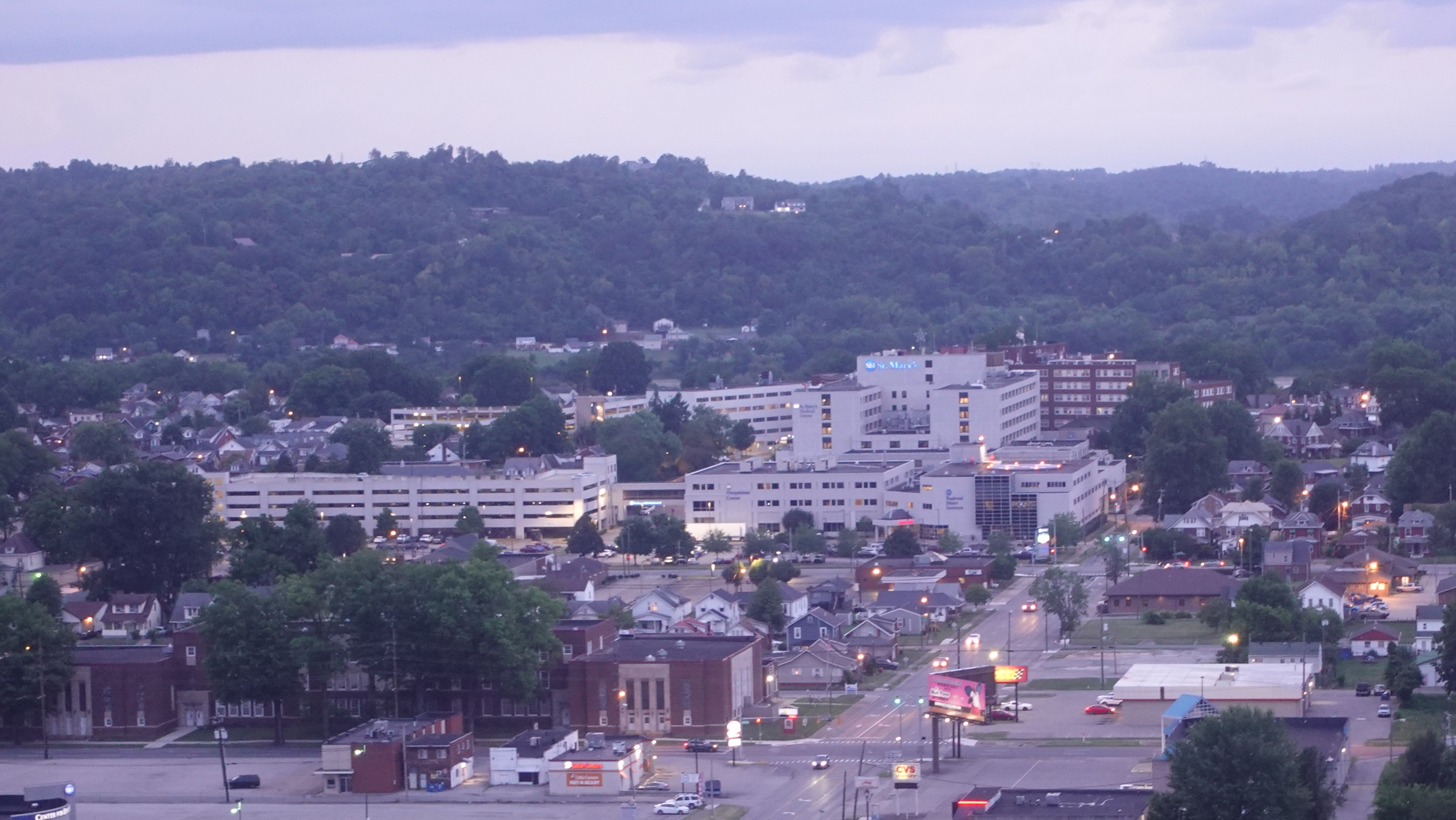
St. Mary's Medical Center from Rotary Park view in 2024.

- St. Mary's Medical Center - Huntington (Cabell and Wayne counties)
- Select Specialty Hospital - Morgantown
- Sistersville General Hospital - Sistersville (Tyler County)
- Stevens Clinic Hospital (closed) - Welch (McDowell County)
- Stonewall Jackson Memorial Hospital - Weston (Lewis County)
- Summers County Appalachian Regional Hospital - Hinton (Summers County)
- Summersville Memorial Hospital - Summersville (Nicholas County)
- Thomas Memorial Hospital - South Charleston (Kanawha County)
- United Hospital Center - Clarksburg (Harrison County)
- Veterans Affairs Medical Center - Beckley (Raleigh County)
- Veterans Affairs Medical Center (Louis A. Johnson VAMC) - Clarksburg (Harrison County)
- Veterans Affairs Medical Center - Huntington (Cabell and Wayne counties)
- Veterans Affairs Medical Center - Martinsburg (Berkeley County)
- War Memorial Hospital - Berkeley Springs (Morgan County)
- Webster County Memorial Hospital - Webster Springs (Webster County)
- Weirton Medical Center - Weirton (Brooke and Hancock counties)
- Welch Community Hospital - Welch (McDowell County)
- West Virginia University Health System - Morgantown (Monongalia County)

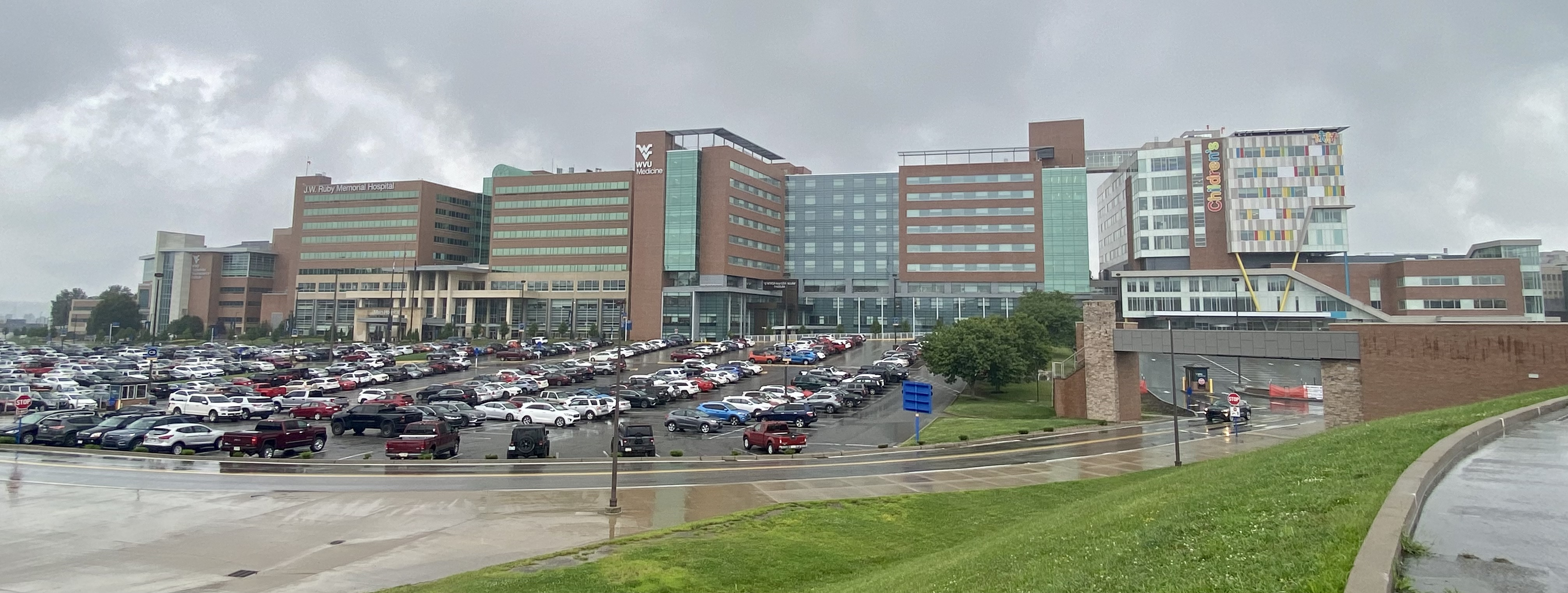
J.W. Ruby Memorial Hospital located in Morgantown, West Virginia (2022)

  - J.W. Ruby Memorial Hospital - Morgantown (Monongalia County)
    - Chestnut Ridge Center - Morgantown (Monongalia County)
    - Jon Michael Moore Trauma Center - Morgantown (Monongalia County)
    - Mary Babb Randolph Cancer Center - Morgantown (Monongalia County)
    - Rockefeller Neuroscience Institute - Morgantown (Monongalia County)
      - Rockefeller Neuroscience Institute Innovation Center - Morgantown (Monongalia County)
  - WVU Medicine Children’' - Morgantown (Monongalia County)
- Wetzel County Hospital - New Martinsville (Wetzel County)
- Wheeling Hospital - Wheeling (Marshall and Ohio counties)
- Williamson Memorial Hospital - Williamson (Mingo County)
- Wyoming General Hospital (closed in 1990) - Mullens (Wyoming County)
