= Richwood Area Community Hospital =

Coordinates: 38°13′13″N 80°32′44″W

- Type: Private
- Industry: Medical
- Founded: 1954
- Defunct: 2008
- Headquarters: Richwood, West Virginia
- Area served: Eastern Nicholas County, West Virginia
- Number of employees: 100

Richwood Area Community Hospital was a hospital located in Richwood, West Virginia. Prior to its closing in June 2008, it served that city and several surrounding communities.

RACH was known as Sacred Heart Hospital when it opened in 1954. The hospital later changed its name to Richwood Area Medical Center when it was purchased by Charleston Area Medical Center. The hospital adopted its current name when CAMC sold the hospital to a community consortium. RACH is assisted by two of West Virginia's largest hospitals, CAMC and Raleigh General Hospital in Beckley for more serious injuries. For health concerns that are not life-threatening but cannot be treated at RACH, patients are sent to nearby Summersville Memorial Hospital in Summersville.

Since its establishment in 1954 as a Catholic Hospital and changing to a public facility, RACH has grown smaller along with the area's shrinking population and dwindling workforce. With less patients to care for the hospital has been undergoing some changes in how to provide the best and most efficient healthcare it possibly can even during its hard times. In early 2002 the hospital joined with Charleston's main hospital to provide the new technology of allowing patients to see a doctor in Charleston without having to travel the long distance to the hospital. For most minor issues the implication was fairly successful. Another trial that has proved costly for the hospital has been the housing of elderly care patients from the overflowing nursing home nearby. Two and a half floors of RACH are dedicated to elderly patient care which has waved confidence in potential patients for using RACH as their stop for healthcare as many assume the hospital will lack in provided care to the young adults and children due to its high population of elderly patients.

In 2005 the hospital with donations and funding from the state through a grant written by board member Jimmy Gladwell, and funding from the hospital itself, paved way for a much needed helipad to help in the shipment of patients to Charleston, West Virginia, Beckley, and even Morgantown's Ruby Memorial Hospital. The helipad was a much needed addition to the aging hospital's need to provide better care.

== Clinic ==
In 2004 the hospital took the route to help improve the health and well-being of patients who cannot afford health care. In the spring of 2004 the hospital opened the Rural Health Clinic which is located on the 4th floor of the hospital providing health care to those in need or who cannot afford the high costs of seeing a private doctor. The clinic has proved to be successful, but has not been the moneymaker that the hospital needs to improve facilities and to offer more treatments and options for those in need.

== Facilities ==
The hospital is one of the tallest buildings within Nicholas County standing with 5 floors. The hospital in its prime was one of the best outfitted facilities in eastern West Virginia serving the rural areas of Nicholas, northern Greenbrier, Pocahontas, and Webster counties. Since then the building has deteriorated and in need of much needed upgrades. The 50-year-old structure has not been improved in years the last being the update to the 4th floor for the clinic and the emergency room area being reworked to better treatments. There have been rumors that the hospital is in the works to build a new state-of-the-art facility within Richwood, but nothing has come to light if and when this will start. The hospital still has one of the highest amount of beds available to patient care within Nicholas County only trailing Summersville Memorial Hospital by only a few beds.
