= Joan C. Edwards Charitable Foundation =

- Founded: 2006
- Purpose: Medical Education Scholarships and Programs
- Location: Cleveland, Ohio, United States
- Method: Programming, Funding

The Joan C. Edwards Charitable Foundation was created in 2006 upon the death of Joan C. Edwards, a well-known West Virginia-based philanthropist.

== History ==
The Joan C. Edwards Charitable Foundation was created by a bequest from the Joan C. Edwards Trust in 2006 at the time of Mrs. Edwards' death. Mrs. Edwards was a philanthropist and former jazz singer. Her husband, James, who died in 1991, was owner and CEO of National Mattress Company in Huntington, W.Va., where the couple lived most of their lives.

In 2010, Joan C. Edwards Charitable Foundation launched the Health Professionals Pipeline Program (H3P) in Cleveland, Ohio, to serve the needs of traditionally underrepresented minorities and low-income backgrounds.

== Edwards Scholarship ==
The Joan C. Edwards Charitable Foundation has created the Edwards Scholarship. This 8-year full-ride scholarship will be given to one student from CSSM to attend CWRU and CWRU School of Medicine.

The foundation has committed to an initial investment of $10 million to $12 million for an endowment that will fund at least one of the mega-scholarships every year, beginning in 2011. CWRU will provide free room and board. Eventually, the endowment could grow to support more than one annual award.
