= Joan Edwards =

Joan Edwards may refer to:

- Joan Edwards (radio singer)
- Joan C. Edwards, jazz singer and philanthropist
