= Hazel Ruby McQuain =

American businesswoman

- Born: Hazel Lera Robinson; March 22, 1909; Coshocton, Ohio, U.S.
- Died: June 15, 2002 (aged 93); Morgantown, West Virginia, U.S.
- Education: West Virginia University; Fairmont State College; Alderson-Broaddus College
- Occupations: Businesswoman, community leader, philanthropist
- Known for: J.W. Ruby Memorial Hospital; Hazel Ruby McQuain Charitable Trust
- Spouses: John Wesley "J.W." Ruby (m. 1926; died 1972) Joseph Burl "Mac" McQuain (m. 1981; died 2001)

Hazel Ruby McQuain (née Robinson; March 22, 1909 – June 15, 2002) was an American businesswoman, community leader, and philanthropist. She is, perhaps, best known for her $8 million donation toward the construction of J.W. Ruby Memorial Hospital, the flagship academic medical center of West Virginia University, which is named in honor of her late-husband, J.W. Ruby.

During her life, McQuain formed the Hazel Ruby McQuain Charitable Trust, which continues to make frequent, substantial donations throughout the Morgantown community to this day.

== Early life ==
Born Hazel Lera Robinson on March 22, 1909, in Coshocton, Ohio, to parents James Robinson and Clemma Lowery, McQuain was one of seven children. When she was 17-years-old, McQuain graduated from Roscoe High School.

== Personal life and career ==
In 1926, just three months after her high school graduation, McQuain married John Wesley "J.W." Ruby. The couple purchased a nearby grocery store in Newcomerstown, which McQuain managed, while her husband worked in the plating department of the Sterling Faucet Company’s brass facility. In 1940, after the brass facility was destroyed in a fire the previous year, Sterling Faucet moved its operations to Morgantown, West Virginia. McQuain's husband was placed in charge of the new location, alongside Sterling, and the two would also make the move to Morgantown that same year. After the Second World War came to an end, Ruby would become the owner of the Sterling Faucet Company.

Soon after McQuain's husband assumed ownership of Sterling Faucet, he embarked on a number of business ventures, including agriculture, mining, road paving, poultry processing, and feed mills. The Rubys also began breeding Thoroughbred racehorses, as well as Miniature Schnauzers. In the early years of her husband's business expansion, the Rubys suffered great financial difficulty, McQuain stating in 1986, "I can remember when I paid all the bills and had nine cents left in my pocket until next pay day. I never complained. It is good to be pinched for money". During that time, she worked seven days per week to help make ends meet.

Over the next several years, the Rubys’ economic circumstances would vastly improve, as Sterling Faucet grew to include five corporations throughout the state by July 1953. In December 1958, Sterling acquired manufacturing plants in Tyler, Texas; Ohio; and Massachusetts, eventually expanding operations internationally with the purchase of a brass manufacturing facility in Oakville, Ontario, Canada in August 1961. By 1967, Sterling reported revenue of $28 million and employed over 2,000 individuals. On November 18, 1968, Ruby sold Sterling Faucet Company to Rockwell Manufacturing Company for an undisclosed sum.

On August 14, 1972, just shy of four years after selling the company that saw the couple prosper to great wealth, amassing millions, J.W. Ruby died at the age of 69, after 46 years of marriage. With her husband's passing, McQuain assumed control of the family's business empire, being named president of Ruby Enterprises, Inc. and its numerous subsidiaries.

In August 1981, McQuain remarried to Joseph Burl "Mac" McQuain of Fairmont, West Virginia. After 19 years of marriage, he would die in January 2001.

== Philanthropy ==
=== J.W. Ruby Memorial Hospital ===
In 1984, McQuain made an $8 million donation to West Virginia University toward the construction of a new hospital, which was to replace the university's then-faltering and dilapidated University Hospital. With her donation, the largest in West Virginia history at the time, McQuain requested the hospital be named in honor of her late husband. In 1988, the new hospital officially opened its doors as Ruby Memorial Hospital.

In 2016, the hospital was renamed J.W. Ruby Memorial Hospital, a move which sought to honor the life of J.W. Ruby, as well as the significance of McQuain's donation in honor of him. With the addition of "J.W." to the hospital's name, Albert Wright Jr., president and CEO of WVU Medicine, commented, "we want people everywhere to remember the significant contributions that [J.W. Ruby] made to West Virginia, and that the Ruby family was the catalyst that helped begin the transformation of the hospital into a nationally recognized academic medical center." Ruby remains the hospital's namesake to this day.
