= J. W. Ruby Memorial Hospital =

- WVU Medicine
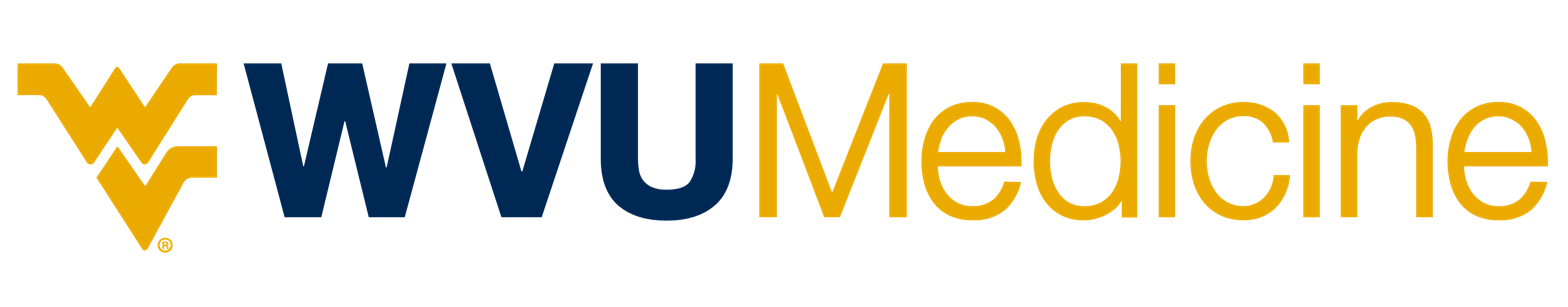

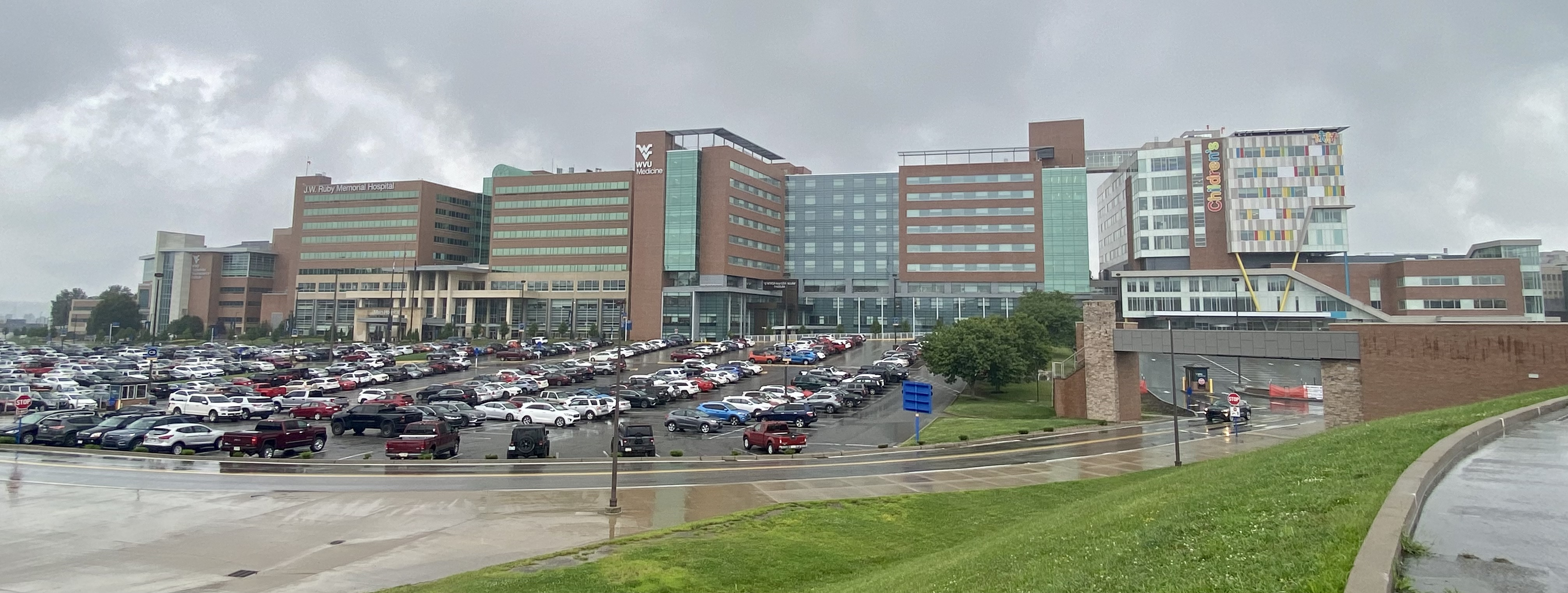
- J.W. Ruby Memorial Hospital, July 31, 2022

Geography
- Location: 1 Medical Center Drive, Morgantown, West Virginia, United States
- Coordinates: 39°39′12″N 79°57′26″W

Organization
- Type: Academic
- Affiliated university: West Virginia University
- Network: West Virginia University Health System

Services
- Emergency department: Level I trauma center
- Beds: 880

Helipads
- Helipad: FAA LID: WV51 and 04WV
Number	Length		Surface
Number	ft	m	Surface
WV51	40	12	Concrete
04WV	40	12	Concrete

History
- Former names: University Hospital (1960–1988); Ruby Memorial Hospital (1988–2016)
- Constructed: Original Hospital: 1951; 75 years ago; New Hospital: 1984; 42 years ago; Children’s Tower: 2018; 8 years ago
- Opened: Original Hospital: 1960; 66 years ago; New Hospital: 1988; 38 years ago; Children’s Tower: 2021; 5 years ago

Links
- Website: wvumedicine.org childrens.wvumedicine.org
- Lists: Hospitals in West Virginia

J. W. Ruby Memorial Hospital is the flagship hospital of the West Virginia University Health System, located in Morgantown, West Virginia. An 880-bed tertiary care center, Ruby is also the largest hospital in the health system and serves as the academic medical center of the West Virginia University School of Medicine.

J. W. Ruby Memorial Hospital is home to several medical institutes, including the WVU Cancer Institute, WVU Critical Care and Trauma Institute, WVU Eye Institute, WVU Heart and Vascular Institute, WVU Medicine Children's, and the WVU Rockefeller Neuroscience Institute.

In 1984, in honor of her late husband, John Wesley Ruby, Morgantown philanthropist Hazel Ruby McQuain made an $8 million donation toward the construction of the new hospital. The donation, the largest in West Virginia history at the time, saw the hospital bear Mr. Ruby's name; he remains the hospital's namesake to this day.

== History ==
=== University Hospital (1960 – 1988) ===
In 1960, the original hospital (or, what is now the south wing of the university's Health Sciences Center), financed by West Virginia's penny-a-bottle excise tax on soda, first opened as University Hospital.

Although the hospital was constructed to last a lifetime, the building was plagued by several events that would leave it in a state of disrepair, including a fire in 1967 and a ventilation system breakdown in 1981, which left a significant majority of the hospital covered in soot, including ten of the hospital's 11 operating rooms, and required the transfer of all the hospital's patients to surrounding facilities for approximately three weeks.

=== Ruby Memorial Hospital (1988 – 2016) ===
As a result of University Hospital's many safety concerns, which would cost an estimated $60 million to repair, West Virginia University president Gordon Gee developed a plan to reorganize the hospital, then owned by the state and funded in large part by its revenue, under a new non-profit corporate structure controlled by the University, which would allow the hospital to borrow debt as a source of financing.

Initially an unpopular idea, the plan had the support of then-Governor John Rockefeller IV and was backed by the West Virginia Legislature, as a means to construct a new state-of-the-art hospital without requiring financing by the state, all while avoiding costly repairs to the twenty-plus-year-old original structure.

By mid-1984, the Legislature had finalized the hospital's transfer into the new West Virginia University Hospitals corporation.

Also in 1984, Hazel Ruby McQuain made an $8 million contribution toward the construction of the new hospital, in honor of her late husband, John Wesley Ruby. At that time the largest donation in West Virginia history, Ruby McQuain's gift would see her late husband become the namesake of the new hospital, Ruby Memorial Hospital.

Ruby Memorial Hospital officially opened in 1988, along with the WVU Children's Hospital; Jon Michael Moore Trauma Center; and Chestnut Ridge Hospital, a psychiatric and chemical-dependency hospital.

=== J. W. Ruby Memorial Hospital (2016 – present) ===
In 2016, the hospital once again received a new name, this time as J. W. Ruby Memorial Hospital, a move which sought to honor the life of the hospital's namesake, John Wesley ("J.W.") Ruby, as well as the significance of the Hazel Ruby McQuain's 1984 donation in honor of him.

In adding the "J. W." to the hospital's name, Albert Wright Jr., the hospital's president and CEO, said, "we want people everywhere to remember the significant contributions that John Wesley Ruby made to West Virginia, and that the Ruby family was the catalyst that helped begin the transformation of the hospital into a nationally recognized academic medical center."

== WVU Medicine Golisano Children's ==
Originally located on the sixth floor of J. W. Ruby Memorial Hospital, WVU Medicine Children's opened as a 119-bed children's hospital-within-a-hospital, and a member hospital of the Children's Miracle Network.

In November 2017, the hospital announced the construction of a new $152 million, 256,000 sq.-ft., 150-bed, ten-story women and children's tower, which will house the children's hospital, once opened. Ground broke on the tower in December 2018.

The new free-leaning hospital opened in fall 2022 and has its own pediatric emergency department and rapid-care center, cardiology unit, epilepsy monitoring unit, operating rooms, cardiac catheterization and endoscopy facilities, pharmacy, cafeteria, and gift shop. The new hospital has approximately a 20-bed pediatric intensive care unit with a 10-bed procedure/sedation unit, 50-bed neonatal intensive care unit, 40-bed pediatric acute care unit, and 30-bed obstetrical unit.

In November 2020, hospital officials announced the overall cost of the new women and children's hospital would total approximately $215 million.

As part of the newly founded Golisano Children's Alliance, a network of 10 children's hospitals across eight states, Tom Golisano made a $28 million donation to WVU Medicine Children's in October 2025. In his honor, the hospital was renamed WVU Medicine Golisano Children's.

== Rankings ==
J. W. Ruby Memorial Hospital has been ranked both nationally and regionally by U.S. News & World Report. In the 2020–2021 Best Hospitals edition, Ruby Memorial was ranked as the number one hospital in the state of West Virginia. The hospital's urology specialty ranked number 40 nationally, and its pediatric urology specialty ranked number 37 nationally.

Additionally, the hospital had four high performing adult specialties, nephrology, neurology & neurosurgery, orthopaedics, and pulmonology & lung surgery, as well as two high performing conditions, congestive heart failure and chronic obstructive pulmonary disease.

== See also ==
- West Virginia University
- West Virginia University School of Medicine
- List of hospitals in West Virginia
- Medical centers in the United States
