= River Park Hospital =

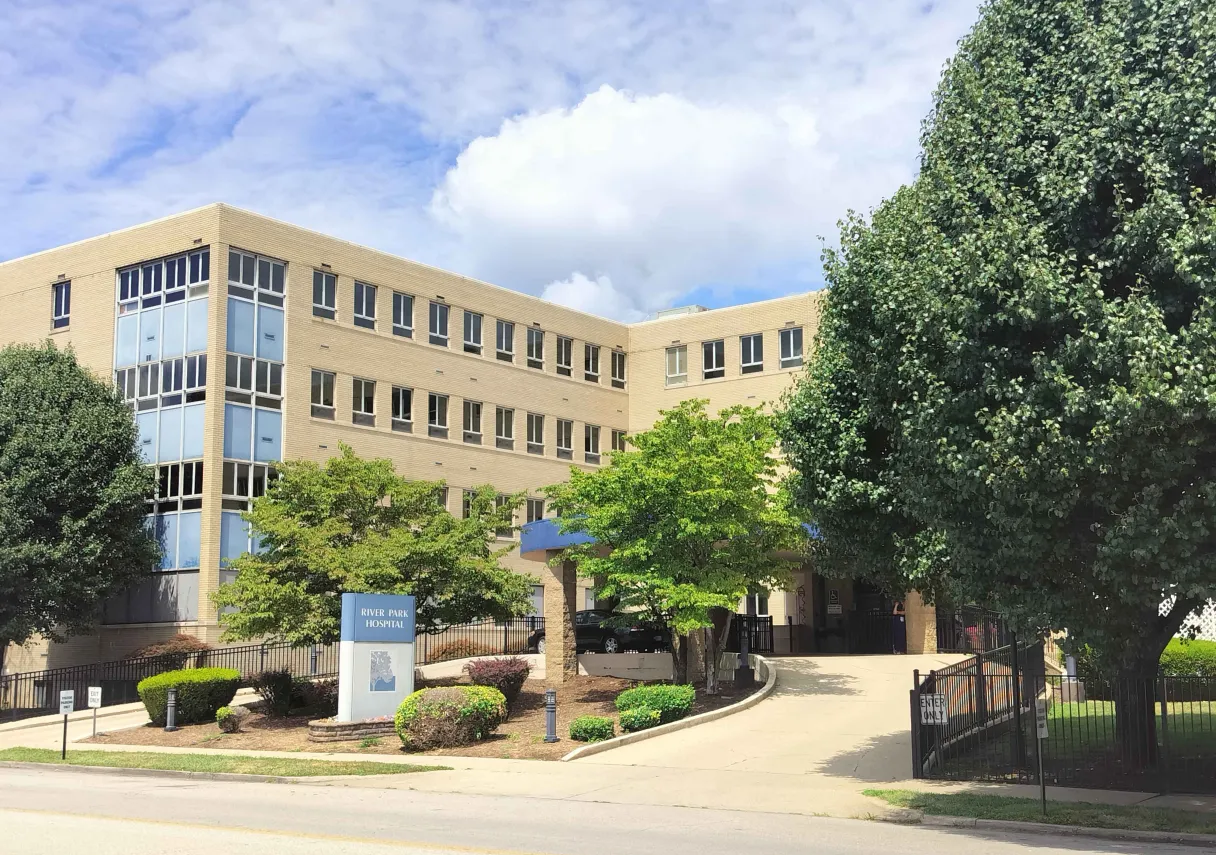
- River Park Hospital in 2024.

Geography
- Location: 1230 6th Ave, Huntington, West Virginia 25701
- Coordinates: 38°25′10.56″N 82°26′12.444″W

Organisation
- Type: Inpatient Psychiatric Facility; Teaching
- Affiliated university: Marshall University
- Network: Joint Commission

Services
- Beds: 187

History
- Opened: 1923

Links
- Website: Official Website

River Park Hospital (RPH) is a inpatient psychiatric facility in Huntington, West Virginia, US. With 187 beds, RPH provides inpatient and psychiatric residential mental health treatment to children, adolescents, adults, and seniors.

As a teaching facility associated with the Marshall University Joan C. Edwards School of Medicine, River Park Hospital gives students a hands-on working experience with psychiatric care. It is also the home to the Marshall University Psychiatric program.

== See also ==
- List of hospitals in West Virginia
