= Ohio Valley Medical Center =

Geography
- Location: Wheeling, West Virginia, United States
- Coordinates: 40°3′37″N 80°43′19″W

Services
- Beds: 200

History
- Opened: 1890 (City Hospital)
- Closed: September 2019

Links
- Lists: Hospitals in West Virginia

Ohio Valley Medical Center (OVMC) was a 200-bed health care facility in Wheeling, West Virginia, United States. It was founded in 1890 as City Hospital. Ohio Valley General Hospital School of Nursing was established on campus in 1892, and was the first school of nursing in the state of West Virginia. OVMC was affiliated with the West Virginia School of Osteopathic Medicine, and had an osteopathic medicine residency program. The residency program offered residencies in internal medicine, emergency medicine, and traditional internal/emergency medicine fields. OVMC was also home to the OVMC School of Radiologic Technology, a two-year hospital based education program. The hospital closed permanently in September 2019.
