= Joan C. Edwards Stadium =

College football stadium for Marshall University

- "The Joan"
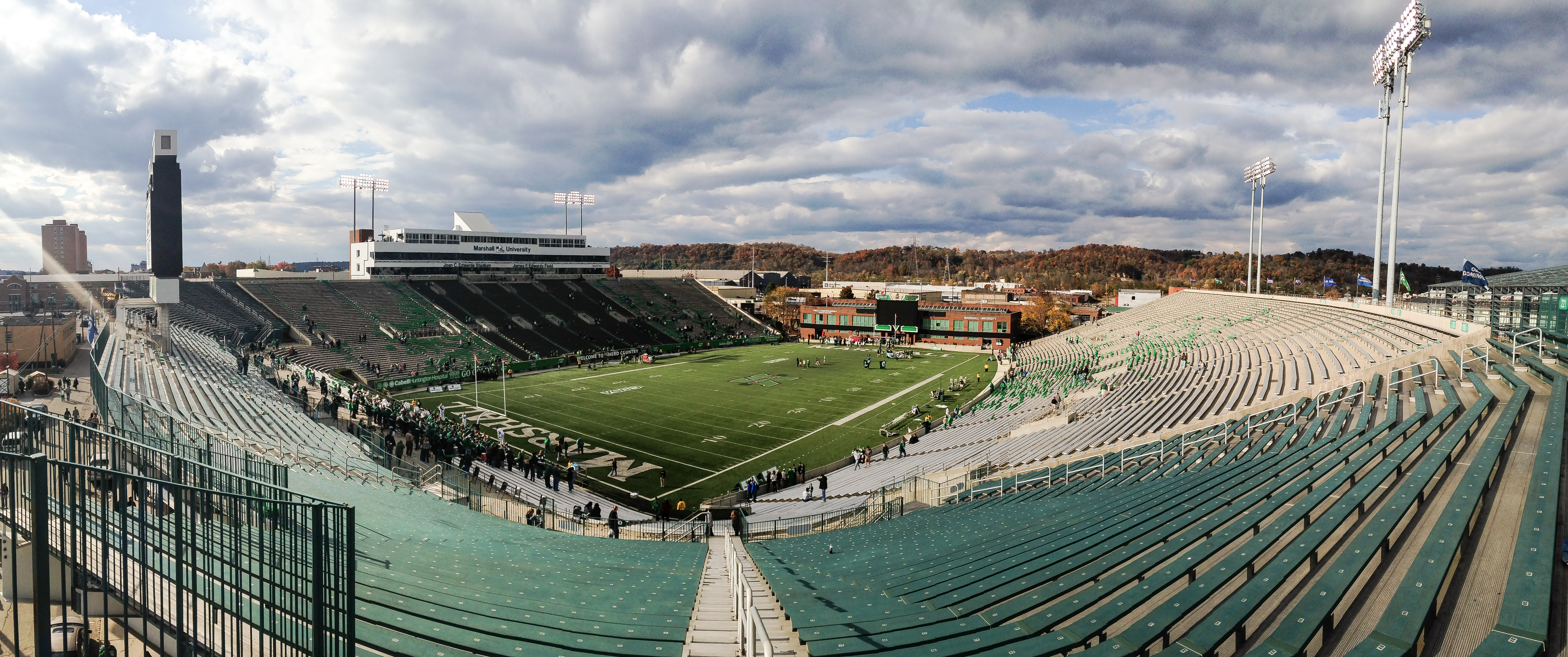

- Location in West Virginia Location in the United States
- Former names: Marshall University Stadium (1991–2003)
- Location: 2001 3rd Avenue; Huntington, West Virginia 25755 U.S.
- Coordinates: 38°25′30″N 82°25′15″W
- Owner: Marshall University
- Operator: Marshall University
- Capacity: 38,000 (2022–present); Former capacity: List: 28,000 (1991–1993); 30,000 (1994–1999); 38,019 (2000–2010); 41,382 (2010-2021)
- Executive suites: 20
- Surface: Omniturf (1991–1997); AstroTurf (1998–2004); FieldTurf (2005–2013); AstroTurf (2014–present)
- Record attendance: 41,382 (2010)

Construction
- Groundbreaking: July 18, 1990
- Opened: September 7, 1991
- Cost: $30 million ($70.9 million in 2025 dollars)
- Architect: Rosser FABRAP
- General contractor: Frank Irey Company/River Cities

Tenants
- Marshall Thundering Herd (NCAA) (1991–present); NCAA Division I Football Championship (1992–1996)

Joan C. Edwards Stadium, formerly Marshall University Stadium, is a football stadium located on the campus of Marshall University in Huntington, West Virginia, United States. It currently can hold 38,000 spectators and includes twenty deluxe, indoor suites, 300 wheelchair-accessible seating, a state-of-the-art press-box, 14 concession areas, and 16 separate restrooms. It also features 90,000 sq ft (8,000 m^{2}) of artificial turf and 1,837 tons of structural steel. It also houses the Shewey Athletic Center (Marshall University), a fieldhouse and a training facility. The new stadium opened in 1991 and replaced Fairfield Stadium, a condemned off-campus facility built in 1927 in the Fairfield Park neighborhood.

Marshall has a 188-43 overall record at Joan C. Edwards Stadium for a winning percentage of .814, one of the top home winning percentages in the nation.

== History ==
The Joan C. Edwards Stadium was first proposed in 1986 to replace Fairfield Stadium. On January 16, then-Governor Arch A. Moore Jr. met with Huntington and University leaders, stating that "money is available" if the plans for the stadium were put together. On June 15, the Board of Regents gives the green light to the new stadium project; on September 9, the university begins purchasing property east of the central campus for the proposed stadium.

On January 15, 1987, Governor Moore asked the Board of Regents to approve funding for the sale of bonds that would help finance the new stadium. On June 8 of the following year, the state Legislature passes a state budget which has the inclusion of a new 30,000-seat stadium if the Board of Regents can secure funding. A little over one month later on June 9, the Board of Regents passes a resolution that endorsed the construction of a new football stadium.

On October 4, 1988, a rendering of the new stadium was unveiled. The designers of the new facility were Stafford/Rosser Fabrap, a joint venture between Stafford Consultants of Princeton and Rosser Fabrap International of Atlanta. Soon after, the Board of Regents were given 1,800 sq ft (170 m^{2}). of property by the Greater Huntington Area Chamber of Commerce. On November 1, the Board of Regents purchased additional property and hired investment bankers who helped decide the optimal financing method for the project.

On January 11, 1989, the Board of Regents approved a $70 million bond sale, $30 million of which was for the new Marshall stadium. Demolition of the existing structures for the new stadium began on December 9. A contract for the new stadium was awarded on June 13, 1990, to RC-Irey, a joint venture between River City Construction Company of Huntington and the Frank Irey, Jr. Company of Monongahela, Pennsylvania. Groundbreaking ceremonies took place one month later on July 18. By October 6, 1990, steel beams were being erected for the new stadium. Marshall's "Thundering Herd" played their last game at Fairfield Stadium against Eastern Kentucky University on November 10, losing 12–15.

On January 19, 1991, the designers admitted there was only room for 28,000 seats, not the original 30,000 due to an error in calculating the size of the chairback seats. The remaining 2,000 were to be added to the south end zone after the 1993 season. It would be the sixth largest stadium in NCAA Division I-AA football. By May 3 of that year, it was announced that the stadium was two-thirds complete and on August 9, the "Thundering Herd's" freshmen and transfers held their first practice in the new stadium.

On September 7, 1991, the new Marshall Stadium was unveiled before a crowd of 33,116. The opening game was against New Hampshire, which Marshall won, 24–23. One year later in July, Marshall football staff and administrators relocated into a new facilities structure at the north end of the stadium adjacent to 3rd Avenue.

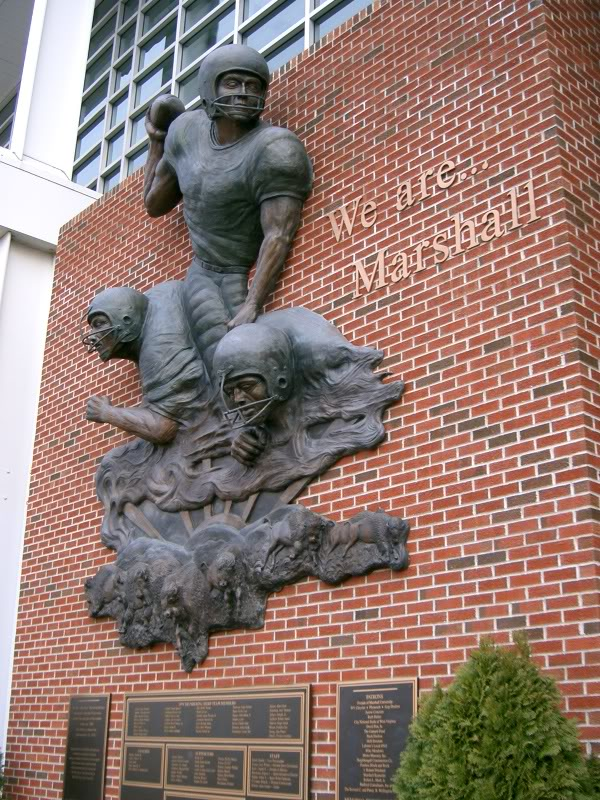
Memorial to the victims of the 1970 plane crash outside Joan C. Edwards Stadium.

In 2000, a bronze memorial to the 1970 plane crash that killed all 75 passengers, which included players, coaches, and other staff members and community members, was placed on the front of the stadium to the left of the main tower, and the road the stadium is on was renamed "Marshall Memorial Boulevard."

On March 25, 2025, country music star Zach Bryan announced that he and musical partner Petey would be performing at Joan C. Edwards Stadium on August 30, 2025. This announcement came months following Bryan's visit to the venue in support of his friend Elijah Gastelum. This is the first time the stadium has been used for a major event outside of football.

The record attendance was set on September 10, 2010, at 41,382 in a 24–21 overtime loss to West Virginia University.

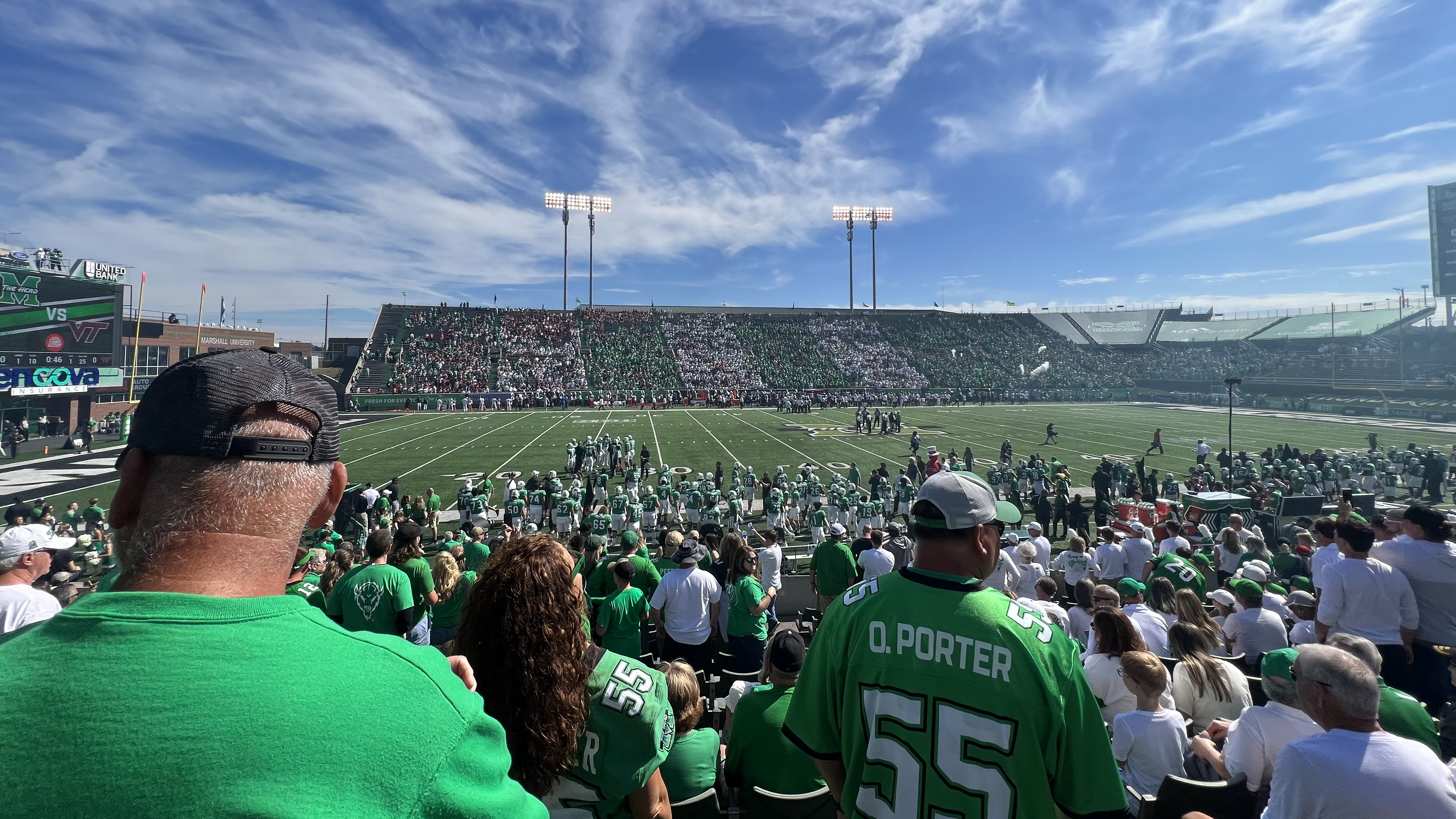
Marshall vs Virginia Tech, September 23, 2023

=== Renovations ===
The expansion of the additional 2,000 seats was completed in July 1994. Six years later, in August 2000, another seating expansion brought the total number of seats to 38,019. The new expansion was completed before the 2000 season opener against SE Missouri St. In 2013, Marshall added four new skyboxes which raised the capacity to 38,227

In 2005, the stadium underwent a change in the playing surface as the AstroTurf surface, in place since 1998, was removed, and a new FieldTurf surface was installed.

In 2014, AstroTurf was reinstalled. The record attendance was set on September 10, 2010, at 41,382 in a 24–21 overtime loss to West Virginia University.

In July 2022, new turf was installed in preparation for Marshall's conference realignment to the Sun Belt. The new field features black end zones with the word Marshall in white outlined in Kelly green. The new field also includes the Sun Belt logo and the number 75 at each 20 yard line, a tribute to the 75 people who died in the Marshall plane crash on November 14, 1970.

Along with new turf, newly appointed Marshall athletic director Christian Spears announced several planned renovation projects for the football stadium, including: a new scoreboard, an expanded concourse area, beer garden, and bathroom renovations. These projects have not been given a completion timeline. For the Fall 2022 football season, seating sections 221, 223, 225, 227, 229, 236, 234, 232, 230, and 228 of the stadium were covered with a massive tarp, and unavailable for fan use. These sections are planned for removal from the stadium entirely to make room for concourse expansion.

In April 2023, Marshall began partial demolition of the South Endzone seating, making room for a new videoboard and concourse area that was installed by the Fall 2023 season.

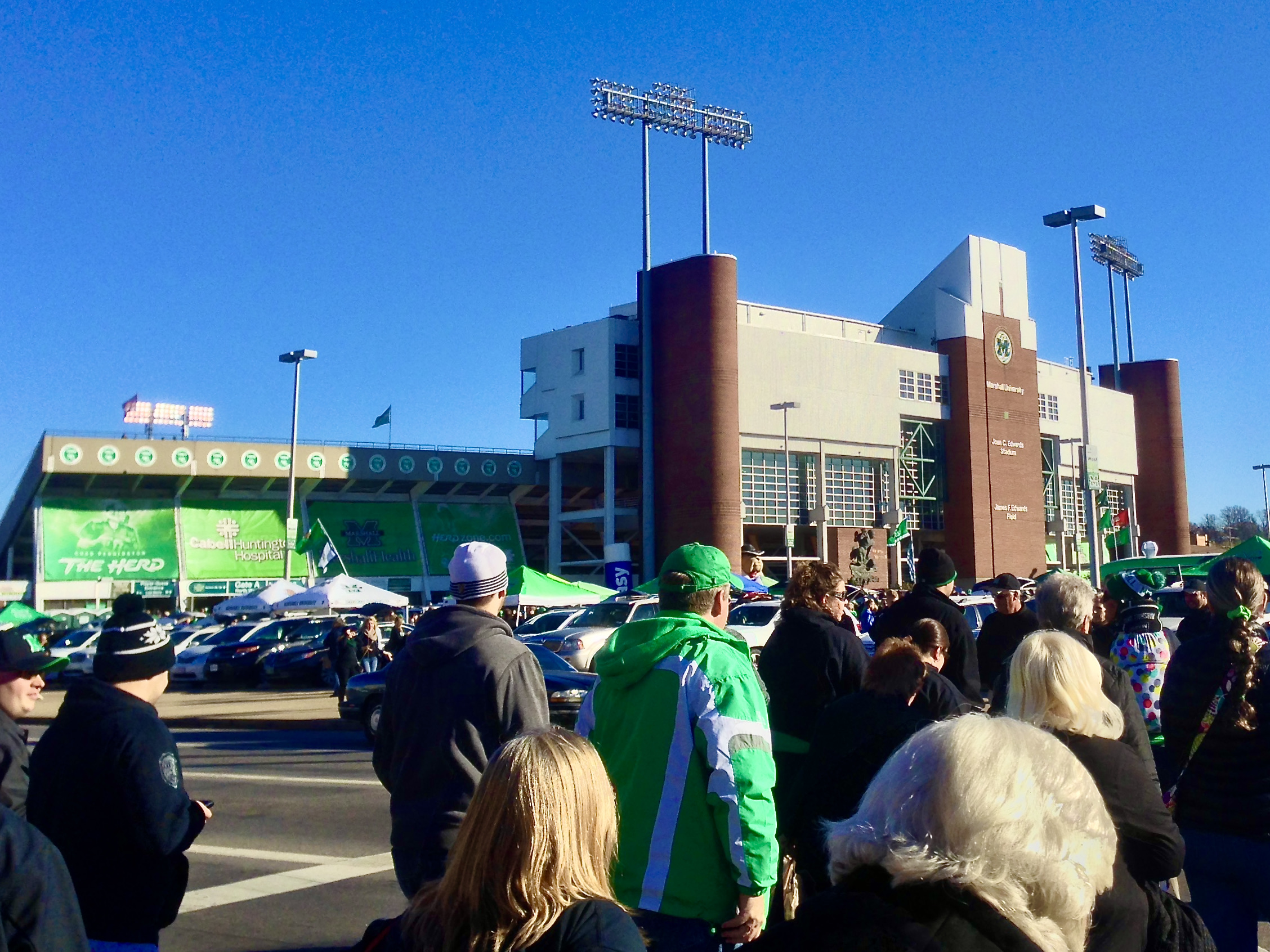
Joan C. Edwards Stadium as seen from Third Avenue.

In February 2025, Marshall Athletics announced that the Shewey Athletic Center would be receiving a renovation, including the addition of a deck, ground-level seating, and the removal of its videoboard. The renovation is driven by the University's NIL collective, The Thunder Trust, and the goal of it is to give more opportunities to the university's student athletes. Construction began in the Spring and should be completed before the start of the 2025 football season.

== Naming ==
On September 4, 1993, the playing surface was named in honor of James F. Edwards, a donor to Marshall University. In November 2003, the stadium itself was renamed to the Joan C. Edwards Stadium, after James Edwards' wife, Joan C. Edwards. The renaming honored the couple, whose combined donations to the university exceeded $65 million. The Shewey Athletic Center on the north side of the stadium on Third Avenue was named for Fred and Christine Shewey, also major donors. The Shewey Athletic Center houses the stadium's locker room facilities as well as offices for both the football team and the athletic department.

The stadium is one of two in NCAA Division I named exclusively for a woman (Several other stadiums are named after husband-and-wife pairs.).

== Tenants ==
In addition to hosting Marshall football, the NCAA Division I-AA national championship game was held at then-Marshall University Stadium several times in the 1990s, including in 1992 and 1996—the years when the Thundering Herd won the national championship. The stadium also hosted the MAC championship game in 1997, 1998, 1999, 2000 and 2002 as well as the 2014 and 2020 Conference USA championship games.

In 2010, Kentucky Christian University played three of its home football games at the stadium.

== Top 10 attended games ==
	Attendance	Opponent	Date	Score	Reference
1	41,382	West Virginia	September 10, 2010	L, 21–24^{OT}	
2	40,592	Louisville	September 24, 2016	L, 28–59	
3	40,383	West Virginia	September 8, 2007	L, 23–48	
4	38,791	Purdue	September 6, 2015	W, 41–31	
5	36,914	Kansas State	September 10, 2005	L, 19–21	
6	34,424	Virginia Tech	September 24, 2011	L, 10–30	
7	33,537	Kent State	October 11, 2003	W, 49–33	
8	33,436	Ohio	September 15, 2012	L, 24–27	
9	33,116	New Hampshire	September 7, 1991	W, 24–23	
10	32,900	UCF	September 20, 2002	W, 26–21	

== Events ==
Date	Performance
April 16, 2021	Mountain Stage Performers: St. Paul and The Broken Bones; A. J. Croce; Shemekia Copeland; Marc Harshman; Ona
August 1, 2022	DCI Huntington
July 31, 2023	DCI Huntington
July 31, 2024	DCI Huntington
July 31, 2025	DCI Huntington
August 30, 2025	Zach Bryan
July 29, 2026	DCI Huntington

== Gallery ==
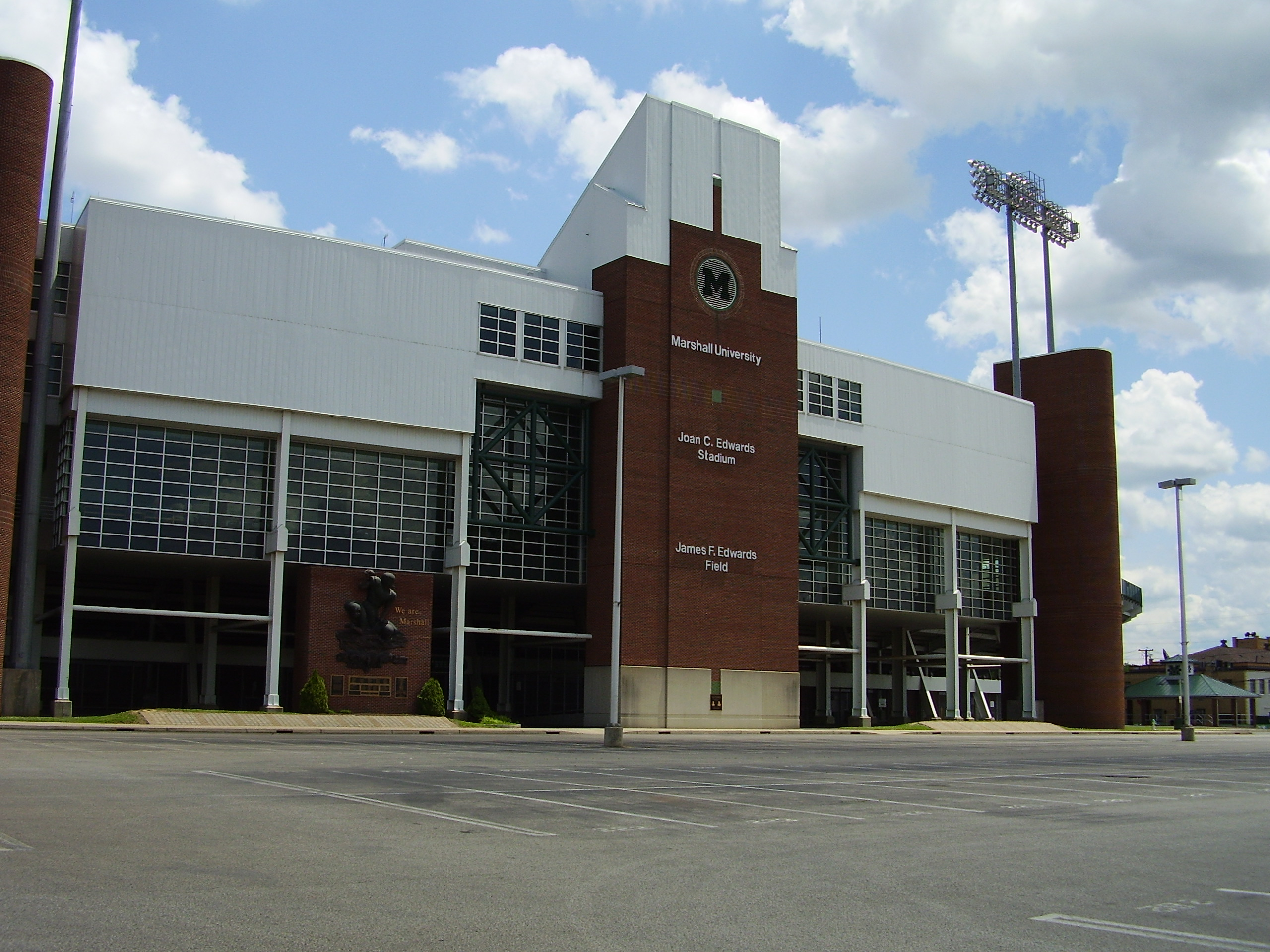
Front entrance to stadium

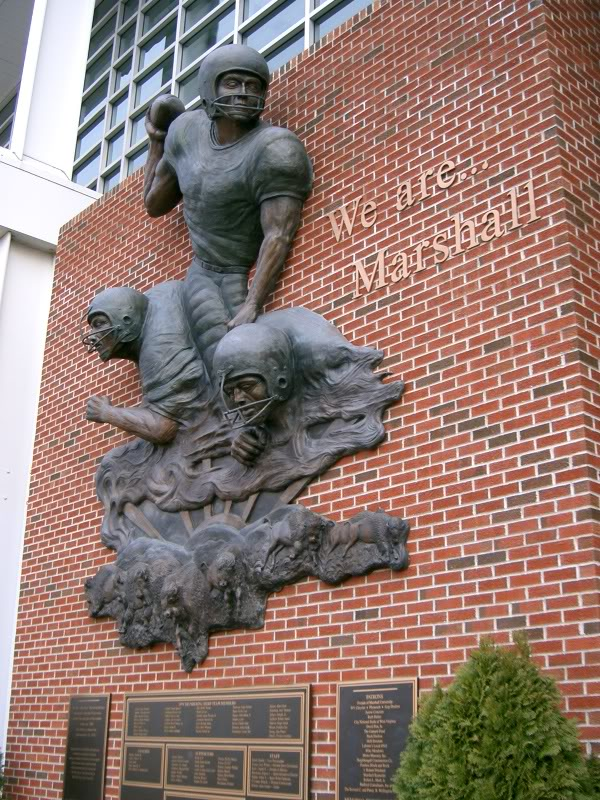
Memorial located on the front of the stadium

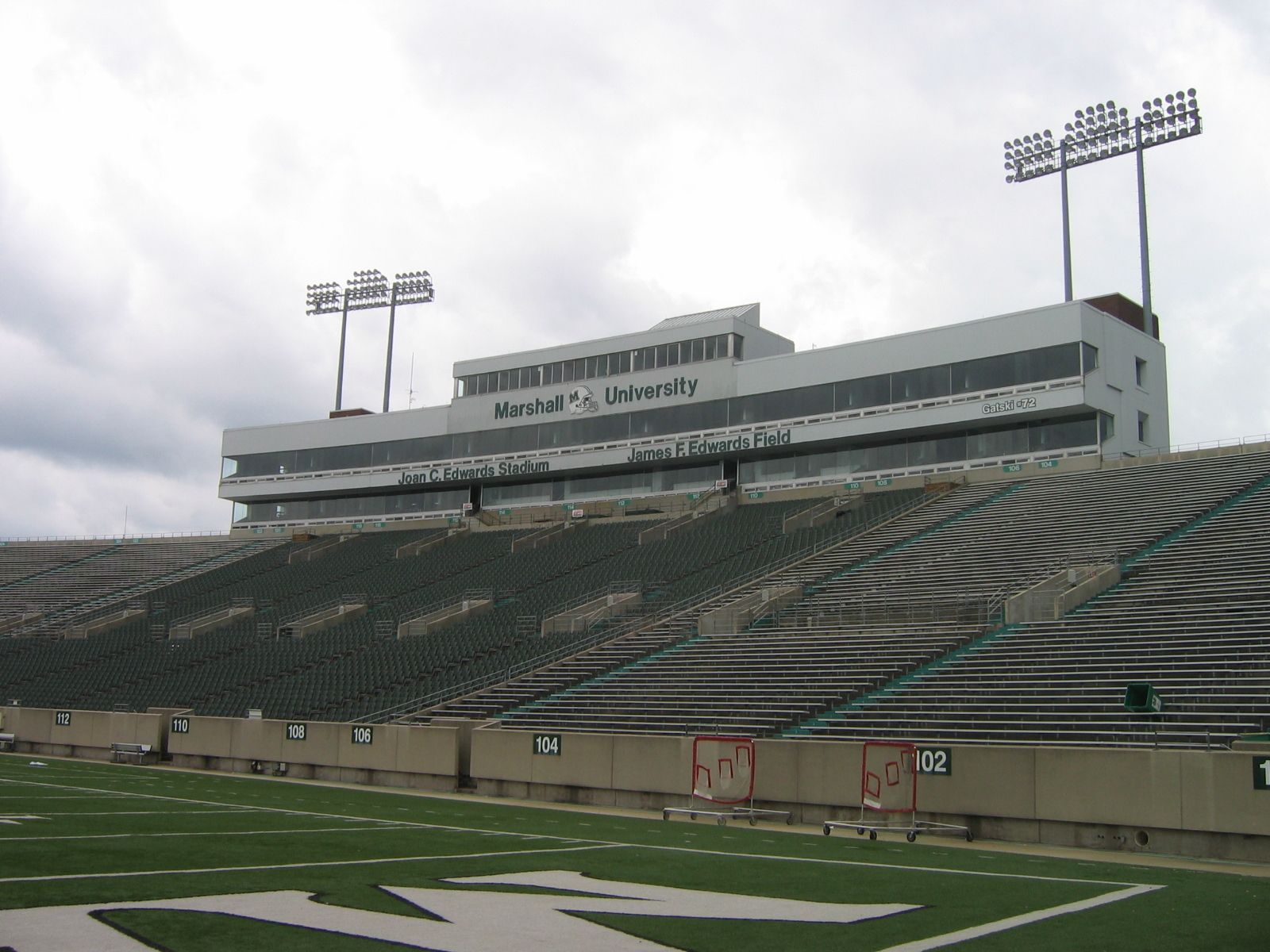
Home side, 2008

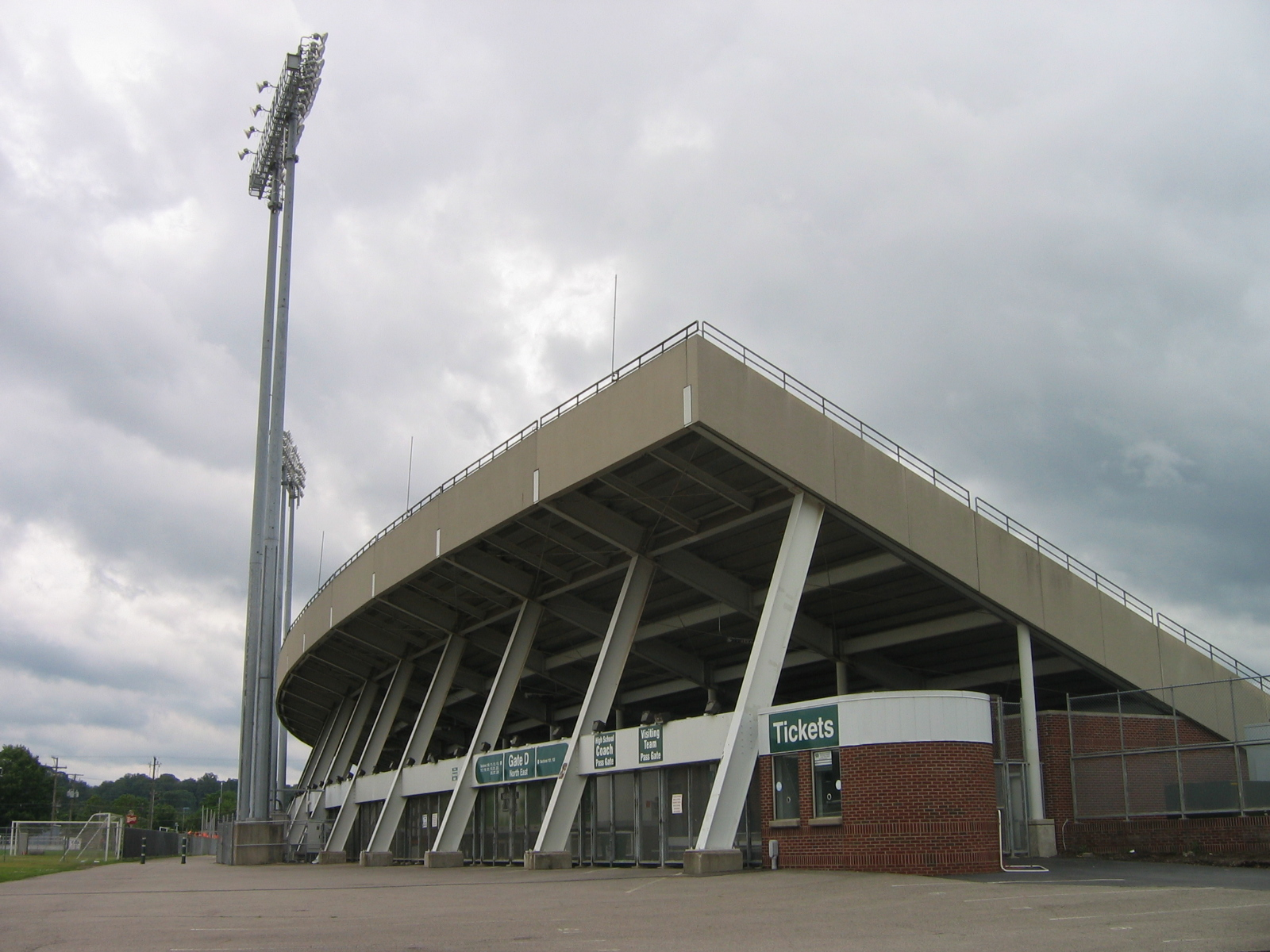
Visitor side exterior, 2008

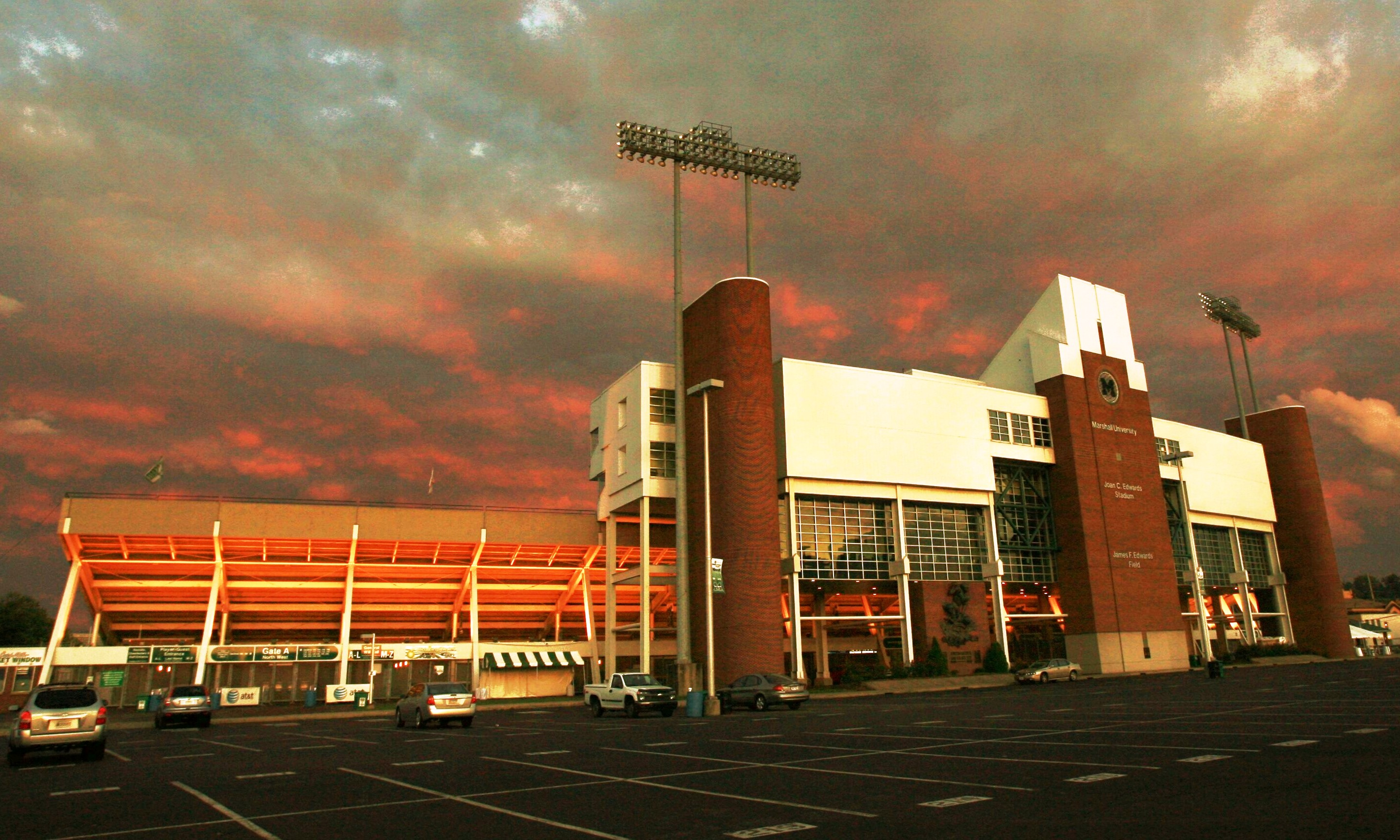
The Joan at dusk, 2009

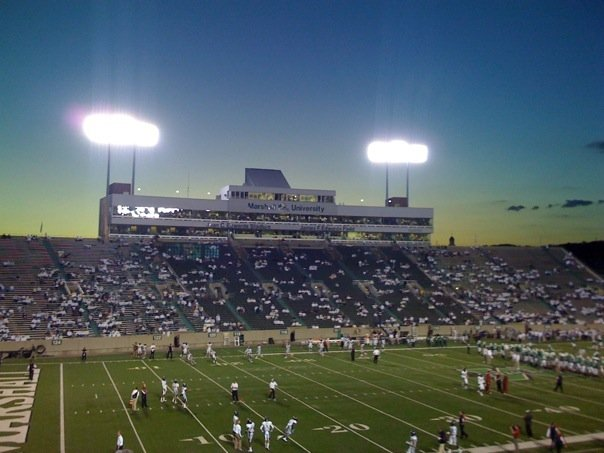
Marshall vs Cincinnati 2008 Pregame

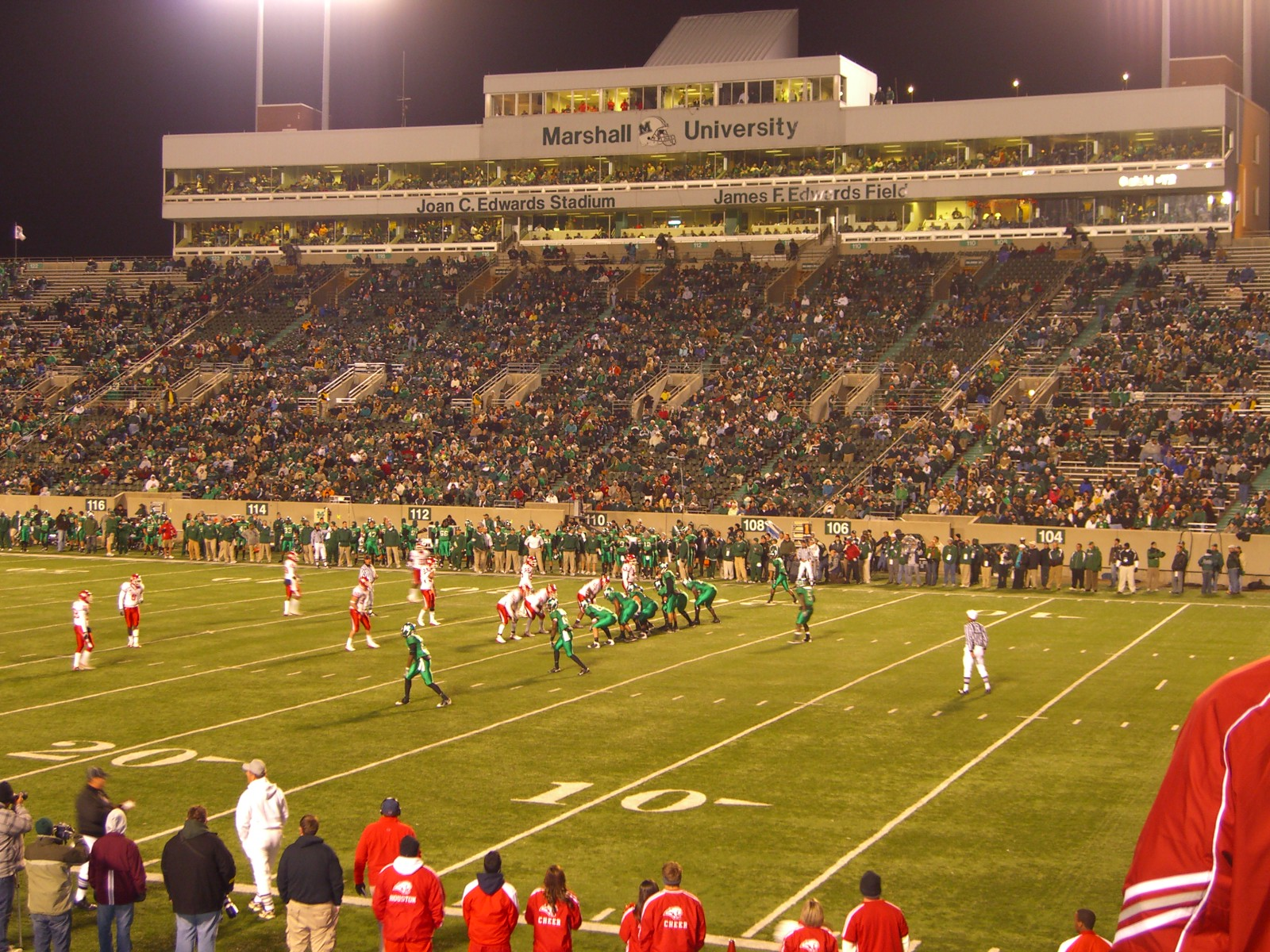
Marshall vs. Houston, 2008

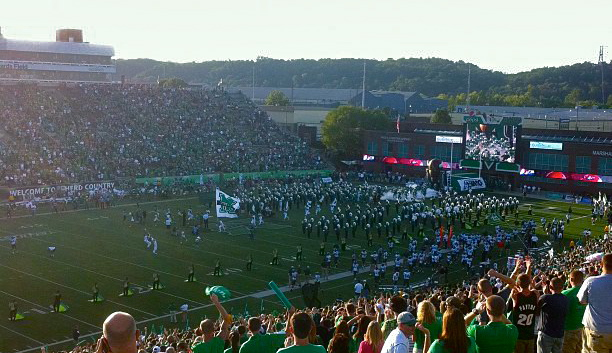
Pregame as seen from the student section in 2012. The Shewey Athletic Center is seen at the far end of the field.

== See also ==
- Buildings at Marshall University
- Cityscape of Huntington, West Virginia
- List of NCAA Division I FBS football stadiums
- List of American football stadiums by capacity
- Lists of stadiums

Preceded by Paulson Stadium	Home of the NCAA Division I-AA National Championship; 1992–1996	Succeeded by Finley Stadium
