= West Virginia University School of Medicine =

Public medical school of Morgantown, West Virginia, US

Coordinates: 39°39′17.6″N 79°57′29.4″W

- Type: Public
- Established: 1902
- Affiliations: West Virginia University
- Dean: Clay Marsh
- Students: 1,700+
- Doctoral students: 450 M.D. candidates
- Location: Morgantown, West Virginia, U.S.
- Campus: Urban
- Website: medicine.hsc.wvu.edu

The West Virginia University School of Medicine is the professional school for studying medicine and other health professions at West Virginia University in Morgantown, West Virginia. The medical school was established in 1902 as the first such institution in West Virginia and remains one of only three medical schools in the state. The main campus in Morgantown is located in the WVU Health Sciences Center, a medical complex that is also home to the Schools of Dentistry, Nursing, Pharmacy, and Public Health.

== M.D. Program ==
Around 120 students matriculate into the M.D. program every fall. All medical students spend their first two years at the main campus in Morgantown before moving on to complete their clinical work during their final two years in the program. Students can complete their rotations at either the Morgantown campus, the Charleston Campus, or the Eastern Campus. Students who remain in Morgantown will practice at J.W. Ruby Memorial Hospital, a 690-bed academic medical center and Level 1 Trauma Center. Charleston Campus is located at the Charleston Area Medical Center's Memorial Hospital campus. WVU's Eastern Campus provides a community-based, direct clinical experience and teaches students at the Berkeley Medical Center in Martinsburg and Jefferson Medical Center in Ranson. All hospitals are part of the WVU Medicine system.

As of 2026, the mean MCAT and undergraduate GPA for admitted students is 510 and 3.77, respectively.

The WVU School of Medicine is fully accredited by the Accreditation Council for Graduate Medical Education (ACGME) and is a participating member of the National Resident Matching Program (NRMP). Fully accredited residencies, internships and fellowships at West Virginia University include:

Anesthesiology, Psychiatry, Dermatology, Emergency Medicine, Rural Family Medicine, Internal Medicine, Pediatrics, Neurology, Neurosurgery, Obstetrics and Gynecology, Occupational Medicine, Ophthalmology, Orthopedics, Otolaryngology, Pathology, Plastic Surgery, Radiation Oncology, Radiology, General Surgery, and Urology.

== Graduate-level Professional Programs ==
- Athletic Training (MS)
- Biomedical Sciences (MS, PhD)
- Clinical and Translational Sciences (Certificate, MS, PhD)
- Health Sciences (MS)
- Exercise Physiology (MS)
- MD/PhD Scholars Program
- Occupational Therapy
- Physical Therapy
- Pathologists' Assistant
- Physician Assistant

== Undergraduate Medical Education ==
West Virginia University School of Medicine includes the following undergraduate professional programs:

- Exercise Physiology
- Health Informatics and Information Management
- Immunology and Medical Microbiology
- Medical Laboratory Science
- Occupational Therapy

== Accreditation ==
West Virginia University School of Medicine is currently accredited by the Liaison Committee on Medical Education, the Accreditation Council for Graduate Medical Education, the Accreditation Council for Continuing Medical Education, the National Accrediting Agency for Clinical Laboratory Sciences, the Accreditation Council for Occupational Therapy Education of the American Occupational Therapy Association, and the Commission on Accreditation in Physical Therapy Education.
