= St. Mary's Medical Center (Huntington) =

- Marshall Health Network

Geography
- Location: Huntington, West Virginia, United States
- Coordinates: 38.43165°N 82.40067°W

Organization
- Care system: Private
- Type: Teaching
- Affiliated university: Marshall University

Services
- Emergency department: Level II trauma center
- Beds: 393

Helipads
- Helipad: FAA LID: WV02
Number	Length		Surface
Number	ft	m	Surface
H1	28	9	Concrete

History
- Founded: 1924

Links
- Website: http://www.st-marys.org/
- Lists: Hospitals in West Virginia

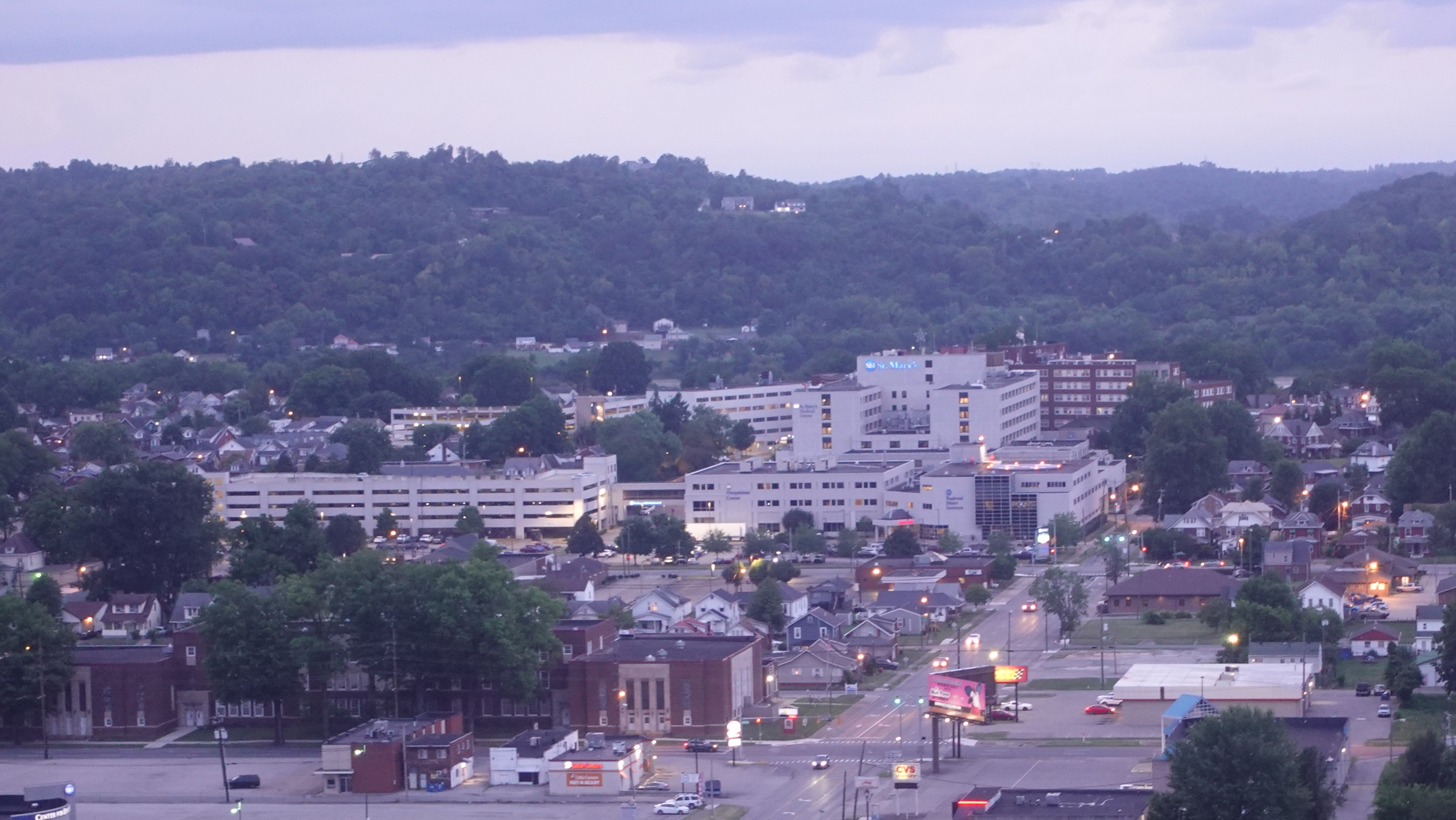
St. Mary's Medical Center from Rotary Park view in 2024.

St. Mary's Medical Center (SMMC) is a hospital in Huntington, West Virginia, United States. With 393 beds, it is the second-largest medical facility in the tri-state region. The medical center is the largest private employer in Cabell County with over 2600 employees. SMMC has centers in cardiac care, cancer treatment, an emergency department with a Level II Trauma Center, and neuroscience.

== Academics ==
As a teaching facility associated with the Marshall University Joan C. Edwards School of Medicine, St. Mary's trains medical residents in several specialties. The hospital campus is home to the St. Mary's School of Nursing, the St. Mary's School of Radiologic Technology, and the St. Mary's School of Respiratory Care. All three programs are associated with Marshall University. It is also the home to the Marshall University Physical Therapy program, which began in 2013.

In 2015, the hospital further affiliated with UK HealthCare's (University of Kentucky) Markey Cancer Center.

== History ==
On November 6, 1924, the Sisters of the Pallottine Missionary Society opened St. Mary's Hospital. In August 2002, the hospital was renamed St. Mary's Medical Center. On July 9, 2012, St. Mary's opened a 24-hour-a-day, 7-day-a-week 12-bed Emergency Room in Ironton, Ohio. It contains acute and trauma rooms, imaging and lab services, and specialty doctors will rotate between the Ironton Campus and Huntington Campus.

In 2014, St. Mary's signed a definitive merger agreement with Cabell Huntington Hospital, forming Mountain Health Network (now known as Marshall Health Network).

== Hospital rating data ==
The HealthGrades website contains the latest quality data for St. Mary's Medical Center, as of 2015. For this rating section, three types of data from HealthGrades are presented: quality ratings for twenty-four inpatient conditions and procedures, thirteen patient safety indicators, and the percentage of patients giving the hospital a 9 or 10 (the two highest possible ratings).

For patient safety indicators, there are the same three possible ratings. For this hospital, four indicators were rated as:

- Worse than expected - 9
- As expected - 3
- Better than expected - 1

Data for patients giving this hospital a 9 or 10 are:

- Patients rating this hospital as a 9 or 10 - 70%
- Patients rating hospitals as a 9 or 10 nationally - 69%
