= Joan C. Edwards =

American musician

Joan Cavill Edwards (1918 – May 7, 2006) was a New Orleans jazz singer and well-known West Virginia-based philanthropist.

== Biography ==
Born Joan Cavill in London, England, she moved to New Orleans at the age of four. By age 11, she was singing on New Orleans radio station WWL, the start of a musical career that included filming movie shorts, singing with orchestras, recording with Clyde McCoy and his Kentucky Band, and performing in New York, Pittsburgh and Chicago.

While singing at Pittsburgh's William Penn Hotel, she met James F. Edwards, owner and CEO of National Mattress Company (Namaco), whom she married in 1937. She moved to Huntington, West Virginia, native home of her husband.

Joan and James Edwards donated more than $65 million to Marshall University and the Huntington community. She was the largest single donor to Marshall University in the modern era. Joan C. Edwards died on May 7, 2006, from liver cancer. She spent the last few days of her life receiving treatment and care in the cancer center she helped to create, which is located in Huntington, West Virginia, at Cabell Huntington Hospital.

Upon her death, the Joan C. Edwards Charitable Foundation was created in her name to help fund scholarships for medical school.

== Buildings named after her ==
- Joan C. Edwards School of Medicine
- Joan C. Edwards Stadium
- Marshall University Jomie Jazz Center
- Marshall University Joan C. Edwards Performing Arts Center
- Edwards Comprehensive Cancer Center

== Trivia ==
Joan C. Edwards Stadium is one of two NCAA Division I football stadiums named after a woman. The other is Williams-Brice Stadium at the University of South Carolina named after Martha Williams-Brice.
