= James F. Edwards =

American businessman and philanthropist

- Born: May 5, 1910
- Died: December 7, 1991 (aged 81); Huntington, West Virginia
- Occupation: CEO of Namaco
- Spouse: Joan C. Edwards

James F. Edwards (May 5, 1910 – December 7, 1991) was an American businessman and philanthropist.

== Career ==
Edwards was the CEO of Namaco Industries, which operated the National Mattress Company. Other business ventures included Key Centurion Bancshares, Inc. and The Ogden Corporation. Civic endeavors extended to the Huntington Museum of Art.

=== Philanthropy ===
In honor of Mr. and Mrs. Edwards' support of Marshall University, the playing surface of their football stadium was named James F. Edwards Field in 1993. In 2003, the stadium itself was renamed Joan C. Edwards Stadium.

Other namesakes include:

- James F. Edwards Institute for Cancer Treatment
- Jomie Center for Jazz Studies

== Personal life ==
Edwards met Joan C. Edwards while she was singing at Pittsburgh's William Penn Hotel, whom he married in 1937.
