= Charleston Area Medical Center =

Geography
- Location: Charleston, West Virginia, United States
- Coordinates: 38°20′52″N 81°37′38″W

Organization
- Type: Teaching
- Affiliated university: West Virginia School of Osteopathic Medicine; West Virginia University

Services
- Emergency department: Level I trauma center
- Beds: 1078

Helipads
- Helipad: FAA LID: WV56
Number	Length		Surface
Number	ft	m	Surface
H1	44	13	Concrete

Links
- Website: www.camc.org
- Lists: Hospitals in West Virginia

Charleston Area Medical Center (CAMC) is a medical center in Charleston, West Virginia, formed by a merger of previously independent facilities. It is the 2nd largest hospital in West Virginia.

Charleston Area Medical Center is the primary medical facility for the city of Charleston. There is a combined total of 838 staffed beds between three facilities. In 2008, there were 98,103 emergency department visits, 3,131 births, 33,132 ambulatory surgeries, 557,867 outpatient visits, along with 35,294 inpatient discharges, 26,597 general operating room procedures, 1,687 open-heart bypass procedures and 8,294 procedures performed in cardiac cath labs.

CAMC consists of five locations: Memorial Hospital, General Hospital, Women and Children's Hospital, Teays Valley Hospital, and Greenbrier Valley Medical Center. The largest branch is the CAMC Memorial Hospital, located in the Kanawha City neighborhood. It primarily hosts cardiac, oncology, and internal medicine cases. The second largest is CAMC General Hospital, located downtown, which focuses on neurology, orthopedics, trauma, and rehabilitation care. The third is Women and Children's Hospital, which is located on the banks of the Elk River. CAMC's fourth campus is the CAMC-Teays Valley Hospital, located in Putnam County to the west of Charleston, and serves that suburban area. The fifth campus, added in 2023 as CAMC-Greenbrier Valley Medical Center, is located in Greenbrier County towards the southeastern corner of West Virginia.

CAMC is a tertiary, teaching institution with numerous educational affiliations, including West Virginia University and West Virginia School of Osteopathic Medicine. CAMC hospitals are training sites for WVU medical students and CAMC residents and fellows. In addition, CAMC is one of the primary teaching hospitals of the West Virginia School of Osteopathic Medicine and training sites for WVSOM medical students and several Osteopathic Residencies. CAMC is also the home of the Marshall University Doctor of Nurse Anesthesia Practice (DNAP) nurse anesthesia program.

CAMC provides the most uncompensated care in the state of West Virginia, with a total benefit to the community over $115 million per year.

== History ==
During 2005 and 2006, the facility won awards for being one of the top 50 hospitals for cardiology and cardiac surgery on the US News List of "Best Hospitals."

== Graduate medical education ==
Charleston Area Medical Center operates a number of osteopathic residency programs accredited by the American Osteopathic Association. CAMC hosts residency programs in family medicine, internal medicine, emergency medicine, pediatrics, and urologic surgery. CAMC trains 172 interns, residents, and fellows each year.

== Hospital rating data ==
The HealthGrades website contains the latest quality data for Charleston Area Medical Center, as of 2015. For this rating section three different types of data from HealthGrades are presented: quality ratings for thirty-two inpatient conditions and procedures, thirteen patient safety indicators, percentage of patients giving the hospital a 9 or 10 (the two highest possible ratings).

For inpatient conditions and procedures, there are three possible ratings: worse than expected, as expected, better than expected. For this hospital the data for this category is:

- Worse than expected - 2
- As expected - 17
- Better than expected - 13

For patient safety indicators, there are the same three possible ratings. For this hospital safety indicators were rated as:

- Worse than expected - 3
- As expected -9
- Better than expected - 1

Data for patients giving this hospital a 9 or 10 are:

- Patients rating this hospital as a 9 or 10 - 69%
- Patients rating hospitals as a 9 or 10 nationally - 69%
