= Joan C. Edwards School of Medicine =

Medical school of Marshall University

Coordinates: 38°24′36.5″N 82°25′39.1″W

Marshall University Joan C. Edwards School of Medicine
- Type: Public
- Established: 1977
- Parent institution: Marshall University
- Dean: David Gozal
- Academic staff: 270
- Students: 299
- Location: Huntington, West Virginia, US
- Campus: Urban
- Website: jcesom.marshall.edu

The Joan C. Edwards School of Medicine is the medical school of Marshall University in Huntington, West Virginia. It is one of three medical schools in the state of West Virginia.

== History ==
The school was founded in 1977 with funding from the federal government, which also provided for a medical school at East Tennessee State University at the same time in order to address the severe shortage of physicians in central and southern Appalachia.

The West Virginia Legislature appropriated funding for the school in 1975, the Liaison Committee on Medical Education granted provisional accreditation in 1977, and the first class entered in January 1978 and graduated in 1981.

The school was later named for the late Joan C. Edwards the largest private contributor to the university in modern history.

In 2017, the Touma Museum of Medicine, named after Joseph B. Touma and Omayma Touma, medical physicians who served Huntington, West Virginia, opened after they donated their +2,800 medical artifacts to Marshall University to start the museum.

== Admission ==
Admission is based on scholarship, the Medical College Admissions Test, and personal qualifications as judged by interviews and recommendations. As a state-assisted medical school, Marshall gives preference to West Virginia residents. However, some positions will be available to well-qualified nonresidents from states adjoining West Virginia, nonresidents who have strong ties to West Virginia or to students who are introduced to our school through our out-of-state recruitment pipeline and outreach programs. Regardless of their state of residency, applicants are considered only if they are U.S. citizens or have permanent resident visas. For 2024, admitted students had an average GPA of 3.74 and an average MCAT score of 504.

== Undergraduate Medical Education ==
The school describes itself as "non-traditional" in that it is not associated with a major research and referral hospital, and students do not take classes in a segregated single building separate from the university. Rather, its aims to educate students using the existing resources of the community and the university to the greatest extent possible.

First year students mainly attend classes on-campus in the Robert C. Byrd Biotechnology Science Center (Marshall University) and also take anatomy classes and use library resources at the Robert W. Coon Medical Education Building, located seven miles from campus at the Huntington Department of Veterans Affairs (V.A.) Medical Center.

Second year classes are held at the Erma Ora Byrd Clinical Center (opened in 2007) on the site of the former Fairfield Stadium near Cabell Huntington Hospital where the nationally recognized Forensic Science Program is also located.

Third and fourth year rotations are conducted mainly at Cabell Huntington Hospital, a 303-bed hospital that is also home to the 72 bed Hoop's Family Children's Hospital as well as the Edwards Comprehensive Cancer Center, the Marshall University Medical Center, which serves as the primary outpatient location for Marshall Health, in addition to St. Mary's Medical Center with 393 inpatient beds, and the Huntington V.A. Medical Center. Notably, in 2012, Cabell Huntington Hospital joined Marshall University Joan C. Edwards School of Medicine and its practice plan, Marshall Health, to form an academic medical center.

The primary focus of the school is educating a physician workforce for Appalachia, although students are placed in premier residency programs across the United States in primary care and subspecialties.

The school also offers a Master's and Doctorate in Biomedical Sciences (and offers a joint M.D./Ph.D. program) and has recently started a joint M.D./M.P.H. program. The school currently offers residencies in 12 specialties. Under the direction of Dr. David Gozal, MD, MBA, PhD, Marshall has continued to build on its mission of educating a physician workforce for the Appalachian region. In 2015, the school enrolled its first class into the newly created BS/MD program for West Virginia students, which allows them to complete their bachelor's and medical degrees in seven years. Graduate Medical Education also expanded in recent years to include residencies in psychiatry, dentistry, and neurology and fellowships in sports medicine (family and community health), nephrology, hematology-oncology, child and adolescent psychiatry, and geriatric psychiatry.

Notably, on May 1, 2018, Cabell Huntington Hospital completed the final steps to acquire St. Mary's Medical Center that increases the size of the academic hospital system to 696 inpatient beds between the two hospitals.

== Graduate Medical Education ==
Fully accredited residencies, internships, and fellowships at Marshall include:

Residencies:

- Psychiatry Residency
- Family Medicine Residency
- Internal Medicine Residency
- Medicine-Pediatrics Residency
- Pediatrics Residency
- Neurology Residency
- Obstetrics and Gynecology Residency
- Orthopedics Residency
- General Surgery Residency
- General Practice Residency - Dental

Fellowships:

- Sports Medicine
- Cardiology
- Endocrinology
- Interventional Cardiology
- Hematology and Oncology
- Nephrology
- Pulmonology / Critical Care
- Child and Adolescent Psychiatry
- Geriatric Psychiatry
- Pediatric Hospital Medicine
- Gastroenterology
- Neonatal-Perinatal Medicine

== Ranking ==
For 2024, U.S. News & World Report ranked the School of Medicine Unranked in Best Medical Schools: Research, Unranked in Best Medical Schools: Primary Care, No.81 in Most Diverse Medical Schools (tie), No.13 in Most Graduates Practicing in Health Professional Shortage Areas, No.59 in Most Graduates Practicing in Primary Care (tie), and No.18 in Most Graduates Practicing in Rural Areas.

== Accreditation ==
In June 2011, the Liaison Committee on Medical Education (LCME) placed the School of Medicine on probation for not meeting nine standards in areas including a lack of diversity for students and faculty, lower-than-average scholarship support and higher-than-average student debt, limited programs to promote student well-being, limited advising, lack of a financial aid and debt management program, and curricular issues. The probation was lifted in 2013, after the administrators of the school demonstrated progress to the LCME, and the school was again fully accredited. The school was accredited for 8 years in 2019.
