= Cabell Huntington Hospital =

Coordinates: 38.409373°N 82.427211°W

- Marshall Health Network
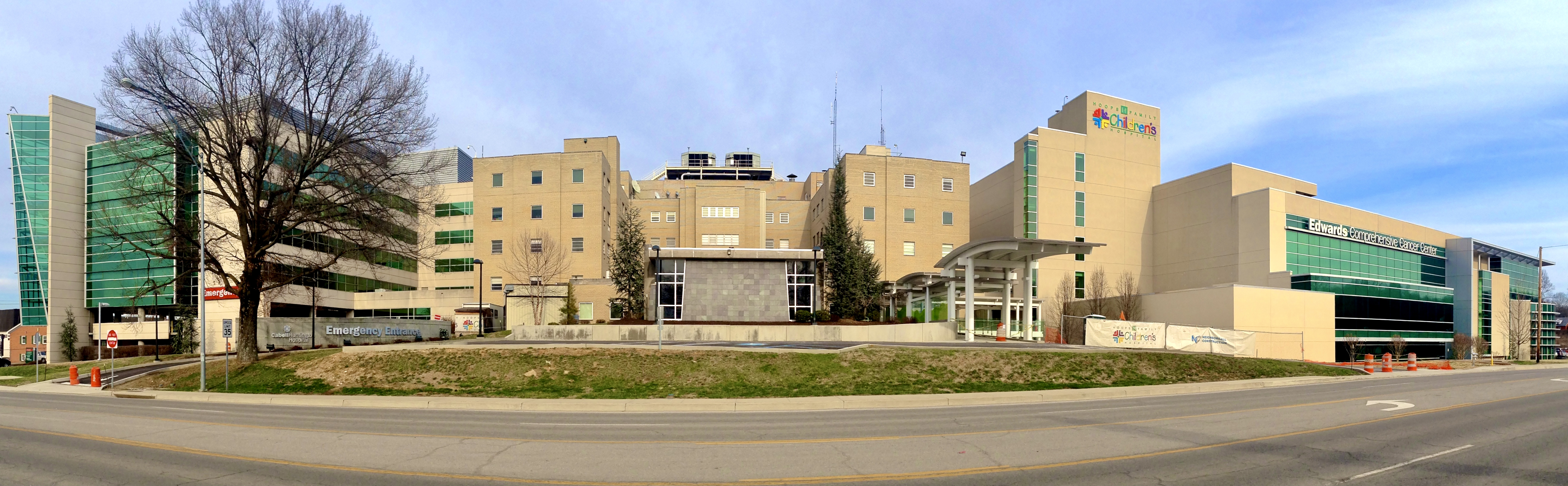
- Cabell Huntington Hospital in 2014

Geography
- Location: Huntington, West Virginia, United States

Organization
- Affiliated university: Marshall University

Services
- Emergency department: Level II trauma center
- Beds: 303

Helipads
- Helipad: FAA LID: WV27
Number	Length		Surface
Number	ft	m	Surface
H1	40	12	Concrete

History
- Founded: 1956

Links
- Website: http://cabellhuntington.org/
- Lists: Hospitals in West Virginia

Cabell Huntington Hospital is a regional, 303-bed academic medical center located in Huntington, West Virginia. Cabell Huntington cares for patients from more than 29 counties in West Virginia, eastern Kentucky, and southern Ohio. It is one of the ten largest general hospitals in West Virginia. Opened in 1956, it is also a teaching hospital and is affiliated with the Marshall University Joan C. Edwards School of Medicine, School of Nursing, and School of Pharmacy. The hospital is also home to the Edwards Comprehensive Cancer Center, a three-story facility that opened in 2006.

In 2005, the hospital announced a major expansion with the planned construction of a 187,500-square-foot, five-story facility. The $85 million "North Patient Tower" was completed in 2007. This project doubled the size of its Emergency/Level II Trauma Department, increased private rooms from 47% to approximately 90%, and increased the number of staffed beds from 268 to 303. The tower houses a 36-bed NICU, the Oncology Unit, the adult acute care units (Intensive Care, Surgical Intensive Care, Burn Intensive Care, and Cardiac Intensive Care), Labor & Delivery, and the Surgical Nursing Unit. Patient rooms in the North Patient Tower have a window and private bathroom. The rooms are larger and the facility has space for family and friends.

In May 2012, ground was broken for the construction of the Hoops Family Children's Hospital located on the fifth floor of Cabell-Huntington Hospital, described as a hospital within a hospital. It adds 72 beds, including a 36-bed Level III Neonatal Intensive Care Unit, a 26-bed General Pediatrics Unit and a 10-bed Pediatric Intensive Care Unit. The Hoops Family Foundation donated a large portion of the $12 million.

In August 2014, Cabell-Huntington Hospital announced the acquisition of St. Mary's Medical Center, the other major hospital in the city of Huntington. The acquisition would give Mountain Health Network (now known as Marshall Health Network), the two facilities' parent organization, a combined 700+ beds, making them the second-largest hospital system in West Virginia.

== Hospital rating data ==
The HealthGrades website contains the latest quality data for Cabell Huntington Hospital, as of 2015. For this rating section three different types of data from HealthGrades are presented: quality ratings for twenty-four inpatient conditions and procedures, thirteen patient safety indicators, percentage of patients giving the hospital a 9 or 10 (the two highest possible ratings).

For inpatient conditions and procedures, there are three possible ratings: worse than expected, as expected, better than expected. For Cabell Huntington Hospital the data for this category are:

- Worse than expected - 2
- As expected - 21
- Better than expected - 1

For patient safety indicators, there are the same three possible ratings. For this hospital four indicators were rated as:

- Worse than expected - 3
- As expected - 10
- Better than expected - 0

Data for patients giving this hospital a 9 or 10 are:

- Patients rating this hospital as a 9 or 10 - 74%
- Patients rating hospitals as a 9 or 10 nationally - 69%
