= West Virginia University Health System =

Nonprofit health enterprise affiliated with West Virginia University

Geography
- Location: West Virginia, Ohio, Pennsylvania, Maryland, U.S.

Organisation
- Type: Private nonprofit

History
- Opened: 1996

Links
- Website: wvumedicine.org
- Lists: Hospitals in U.S.

The West Virginia University Health System, commonly branded as WVU Medicine, is a nonprofit health enterprise affiliated with West Virginia University. It provides healthcare services throughout West Virginia and portions of the surrounding states of Maryland, Ohio, and Pennsylvania, in the United States.

As of 2026, the WVU Health System was West Virginia's largest health system and largest private employer.

== History ==
The West Virginia University (WVU) Health System, operating under the brand name WVU Medicine, was established in 1996 following legislation passed by the West Virginia Legislature. Initially incorporated as the West Virginia United Health System, the organization was created to align academic medicine, clinical care, and community health initiatives within a single administrative structure. The system’s founding members included WVU Hospitals in Morgantown, WV, the principal teaching hospital for West Virginia University, and United Hospital Center in Clarksburg, WV. The integration aimed to improve care coordination, expand access to specialized services, and support the University’s health sciences programs. In 2016, the organization changed its name to the West Virginia University Health System to reflect its closer association with West Virginia University and began operating under the WVU Medicine brand the prior year.

In 2019, cardiac surgeons with the WVU Heart and Vascular Institute performed the first heart transplant in West Virginia. In 2024, the Heart and Vascular Institute also performed what was reported as the world's first combined robotic valve replacement and coronary artery bypass operation.

=== Acquisitions and expansions ===
Over time, the Health System has grown through the acquisition of several hospitals and clinics, adding 14 hospitals to its network between 2016 and 2023. In 2021, the Health System established a health insurance and health insurance services company called Peak Health. In 2022, the Health System opened a new, 155-bed Children's Hospital on its main medical campus in Morgantown, WV. In April 2025, it announced that it would spend $460 million to expand its hospitals and clinics. In November 2025, WVU Health System announced that it was acquiring Independence Health System in Pennsylvania, agreeing to spend $800 million to modernize the five hospitals being added to its network.The acquisition was finalized in Oct. 2026.

== Programs ==
Its clinical programs span the full continuum of care, from primary care to advanced, quaternary care for pediatric and adult patients, with an emphasis on brain and spine, cancer, and cardiac care. For example, the WVU Cancer Institute provides mobile lung and breast cancer screening services in rural West Virginia, and is also pursuing National Cancer Institute designation. Researchers at the WVU Rockefeller Neuroscience Institute have ongoing participation in clinical studies involving the novel use of focused ultrasound to treat neurological disorders such as Alzheimer's, opioid addiction, and eating disorders.

== Hospitals ==
As of November 9, 2026, the Health System had more than 47,000 employees and 31 hospitals:

- Barnesville Hospital in Barnesville, Ohio
- Berkeley Medical Center in Martinsburg, West Virginia
- Braxton County Memorial Hospital in Gassaway, West Virginia
- Butler Memorial Hospital in Butler, Pennsylvania
- Camden Clark Medical Center in Parkersburg, West Virginia
- Clarion Hospital in Clarion, Pennsylvania
- Fairmont Medical Center in Fairmont, West Virginia
- Frick Hospital in Mt. Pleasant, Pennsylvania
- Garrett Regional Medical Center in Oakland, Maryland
- Grant Memorial Hospital in Petersburg, West Virginia
- Harrison Community Hospital in Cadiz, Ohio
- Healthy Minds Kids in Wheeling, West Virginia
- Jackson General Hospital in Ripley, West Virginia
- Jefferson Medical Center in Ranson, West Virginia
- Latrobe Hospital in Latrobe, Pennsylvania
- Potomac Valley Hospital in Keyser, West Virginia
- Princeton Community Hospital in Princeton, West Virginia
- Princeton Community Hospital, Bluefield Campus, in Bluefield, West Virginia
- Reynolds Memorial Hospital in Glen Dale, West Virginia
- Saint Francis Hospital (Thomas Orthopedic) in Charleston, West Virginia
- Saint Joseph’s Hospital in Buckhannon, West Virginia
- Summersville Regional Medical Center in Summersville, West Virginia
- Thomas Memorial Hospital in Charleston, West Virginia
- Uniontown Hospital in Uniontown, Pennsylvania
- United Hospital Center in Bridgeport, West Virginia
- Weirton Medical Center in Weirton, West Virginia
- Westmoreland Hospital in Greensburg, Pennsylvania
- Wetzel County Hospital in New Martinsville, West Virginia
- Wheeling Hospital in Wheeling, West Virginia
- WVU Hospitals in Morgantown, West Virginia
- WVU Medicine Golisano Children’s Hospital in Morgantown, West Virginia

The WVU Health System also operates five institutes:

- WVU Cancer Institute
- WVU Critical Care and Trauma Institute
- WVU Eye Institute
- WVU Heart and Vascular Institute
- WVU Rockefeller Neuroscience Institute
