= Erma Byrd Higher Education Center =

College campus in West Virginia

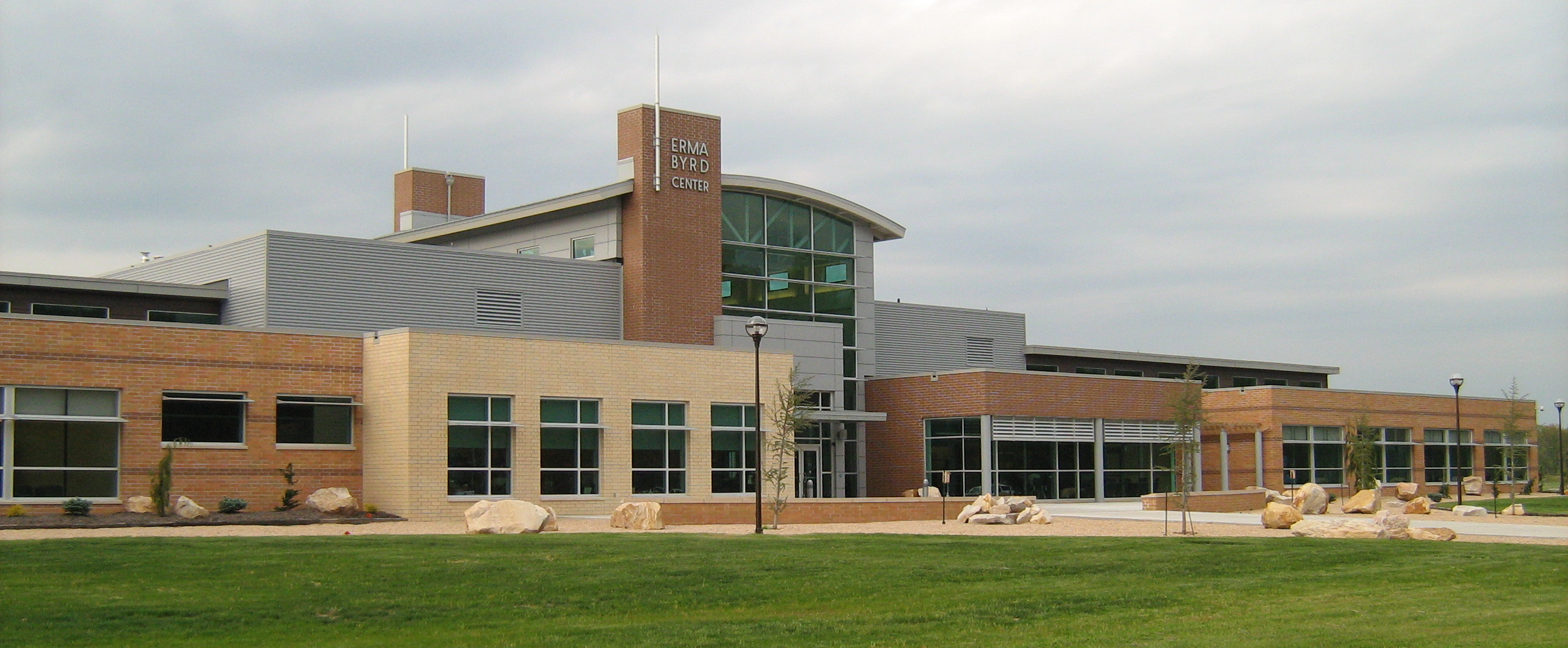
Erma Byrd Center

The Erma Byrd Higher Education Center is a joint venture extension campus of several colleges in West Virginia, US. It is located just off Interstate 64 near Beckley. It was dedicated in 2007 and is named for Erma Byrd, the wife of the West Virginia United States Senator Robert Byrd.

Currently it is used by Marshall University for extension graduate programs under the control of the Marshall University - South Charleston Campus branch campus, by Bluefield State College for programs in nursing, and by Concord University for programs in business and teacher education.

New River Community and Technical College also used the facility, but was forced to vacate in 2010 when it was unable to secure budgetary approval to pay the increasing rent at the center.

The Center consists of one building located on a reclaimed strip mine and is partly powered by wind energy. The reclaimed area has a larger potential development area than the campuses of the three constituent colleges combined. Eventual plans following a complete build-out, which will take several decades, are for new subject areas to be offered by West Virginia University and West Virginia University Institute of Technology followed by an evolution as a full branch campus of Concord, followed by an evolution into a stand-alone state college.
