= Yeager Airport =

West Virginia International Yeager Airport
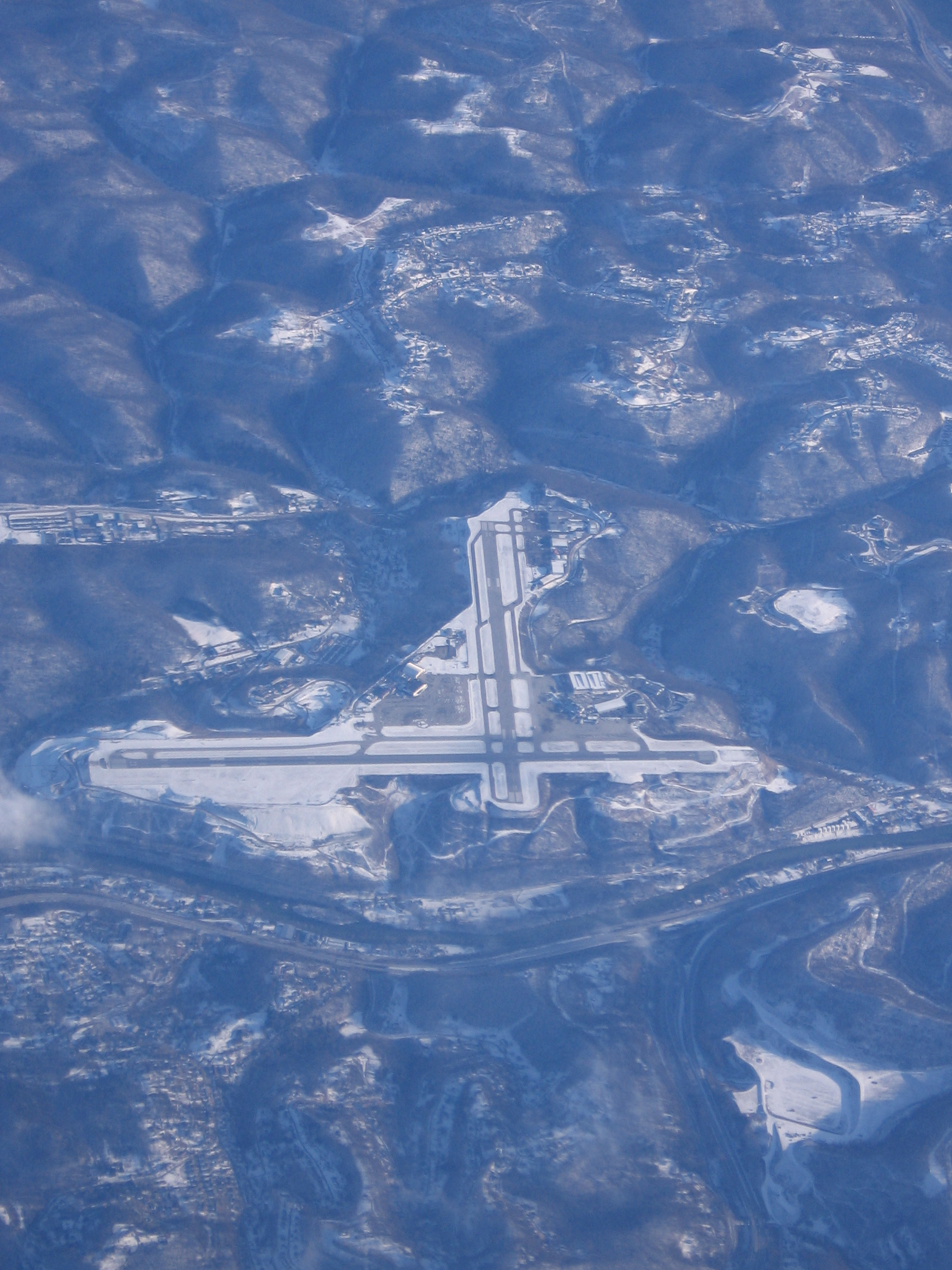
- Aerial view of Yeager Airport, 2009
- IATA: CRW; ICAO: KCRW; FAA LID: CRW

Summary
- Airport type: Public
- Owner/Operator: Central West Virginia Regional Airport Authority
- Serves: Charleston, West Virginia
- Location: Kanawha County, West Virginia
- Elevation AMSL: 947 ft (289 m)
- Coordinates: 38°22′33″N 081°35′35″W
- Website: flycrw.com

Maps
- FAA airport diagram
- Interactive map of West Virginia International Yeager Airport

Runways
Direction	Length		Surface
Direction	ft	m	Surface
5/23	6,715	2,047	Asphalt

Statistics (2025)
- Aircraft operations: 65,897
- Based aircraft (2022): 66
- Total passengers: 432,319
- Source: Federal Aviation Administration

West Virginia International Yeager Airport (IATA: CRW, ICAO: KCRW, FAA LID: CRW) is a public airport 3 miles (4.8 km) east of downtown Charleston, in unincorporated Kanawha County, West Virginia, United States. It is owned by the Central West Virginia Regional Airport Authority. The airport hosts McLaughlin Air National Guard Base, home to eight C-130 Hercules aircraft of the West Virginia Air National Guard's 130th Airlift Wing (130 AW), an Air Mobility Command (AMC)-gained unit of the West Virginia Air National Guard.

The airport sits on a hilltop over 300 feet (about 100 m) above the valleys of the Elk and Kanawha Rivers, and the hill drops off sharply on all sides. Arriving passengers enjoy a view of downtown Charleston or the rolling hills north and east of the field.

Federal Aviation Administration records show 225,150 passenger enplanements in calendar year 2015, a decrease of 6.8% from the 241,566 enplanements in 2014. The Federal Aviation Administration (FAA) National Plan of Integrated Airport Systems for 2017–2021 categorized it as a non-hub primary commercial service facility.

== Facilities ==
West Virginia International Yeager Airport covers 767 acres (310 hectares) at an elevation of 947 feet (289 m) above mean sea level. It has one asphalt runway, 5/23, 6,715 by 150 feet (2,047 by 46 metres).

Runway 5/23's heading is 235°. An Engineered Materials Arresting System (EMAS) was built at the end of Runway 5 to act as an equivalent to a 1,000 ft. runway safety area, as required by the FAA. Yeager's secondary runway 15/33, now taxiway C, was headed 335° and was 4,750 feet (1,450 m) long. It was mostly used by general aviation.

In the year ending November 30, 2022, the airport had 38,083 aircraft operations, an average of 104 per day: 63% general aviation, 13% air taxi, 15% military, and 9% airline. In November 2022, 66 aircraft were based at this airport: 31 single-engine, 6 multi-engine, 4 jet, 17 helicopter, and 8 military.

In 2021 the Marshall University's Bill Noe Flight School was founded at the West Virginia Yeager International Airport. The school, named after the former COO of NetJets, Bill Noe, features a 12,000 sq ft. academic building, a hangar, and an aircraft parking apron.

== History ==
During World War II, Charleston's airport, Wertz Field, closed when the airport's approaches were blocked by the federal government building a synthetic rubber plant next to the airport. There were already plans for a new Charleston airport.

The city started construction in 1944; the airport opened in 1947 as Kanawha Airport and American Airlines flights started in December. A terminal was built in 1950, designed by Tucker & Silling. In 1985 the airport was named for then-Brigadier General Chuck Yeager, a native of nearby Lincoln County who piloted the world's first supersonic flight in the Bell X-1. In 1986 the terminal was renovated. Concourse C, designed by L. Robert Kimball and Associates and costing $2.8 million, was completed in 2001.

On February 27, 2008, CRW's Governing Board voted to close the secondary runway, Rwy 15/33, to allow construction of two new hangars and ramp space for four more C-130s to be based at the Air National Guard facility. It will allow the airport to triple the general aviation area's hangar space and create room for off-runway businesses, and provide parking for up to ten additional commercial airliners. $5 million was given to the airport to build a canopy around the front of the terminal. An additional $2 million was given for a covered walkway from the terminal to the parking garage.

On June 25, 2009, AirTran Airways began service from Charleston to Orlando. AirTran was the first low-cost airline at CRW since Independence Air left years before. AirTran used the Boeing 717-200 until June 3, 2012, when AirTran's last flight departed from CRW.

On March 3, 2011, Spirit Airlines began flights to Fort Lauderdale and on May 5, 2011, Spirit started seasonal flights between Charleston and Myrtle Beach. On June 10, 2012, Spirit ended service to Fort Lauderdale, leaving seasonal service to Myrtle Beach.

People Express Airlines planned service to Orlando International Airport, on a similar schedule to AirTran's former operations at CRW, but filed for bankruptcy before starting.

On July 27, 2021, the airport board members voted to change the name of the airport to West Virginia International Yeager Airport following the completion of the U.S. Customs Building by the general aviation area of the airport.

On March 2, 2023, it was reported that Spirit Airlines would end service to the airport on May 4, 2023. Later in March 2023, it was reported that Breeze Airways would begin low-cost, non-stop flight service to Orlando, Florida and Charleston, South Carolina, with additional flights to New York City and the West Coast beginning over the next two years.

== Concourses ==
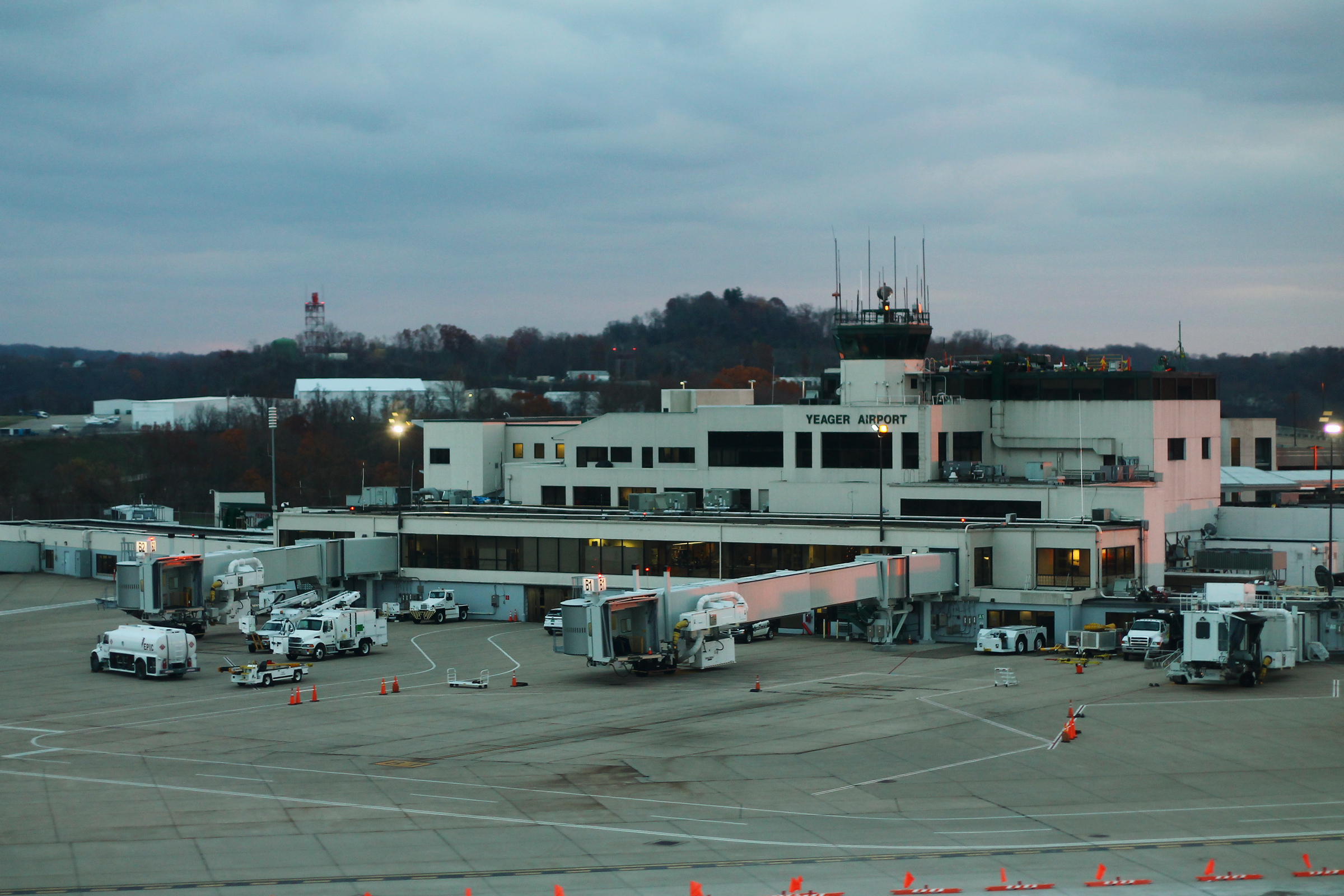
View of the terminal building

West Virginia International Yeager Airport has three concourses.

=== Concourse A ===
Concourse A has seven gates and is used by United. It is accessed via a stairwell and elevator to the left of Concourse B.

=== Concourse B ===
Concourse B has two gates and is used by Breeze and Delta. It contains the airport gift shop, a shoeshine service, and The Junction Charleston, a restaurant, bar, and gift shop owned by Faber, Coe & Gregg. The TSA checkpoint empties into Concourse B, and all passengers must exit the secure area through Concourse B.

=== Concourse C ===
Concourse C has five gates and is used for American flights. It is the newest concourse and opened in 2001. It is accessed via a stairwell and elevator to the right of Concourse B.

== Airlines and destinations ==
=== Passenger ===
Airlines	Destinations
American Eagle	Charlotte, Washington–National
Breeze Airways	Newark (ends January 2, 2027), Orlando, Tampa; Seasonal: Myrtle Beach
Delta Connection	Atlanta
United Express	Chicago–O'Hare

=== Cargo ===
Airlines	Destinations
Air Cargo Carriers	Louisville

== Statistics ==
=== Airline market share ===
Largest airlines at CRW (April 2025 – March 2026)
Rank	Airline	Passengers	Share
1	PSA Airlines	152,000	34.86%
2	SkyWest Airlines	120,000	27.47%
3	Endeavor Air	111,000	25.46%
4	Breeze Airways	53,270	12.21%

=== Top destinations ===
Busiest domestic routes from CRW (April 2025 – March 2026)
Rank	Airport	Passengers	Carrier
1	Atlanta, Georgia	78,220	Delta
2	Charlotte, North Carolina	63,070	American
3	Chicago–O'Hare, Illinois	38,070	United
4	Washington–National, Virginia	13,560	American
5	Orlando, Florida	12,110	Breeze
6	Newark, New Jersey	7,330	Breeze
7	Tampa, Florida	4,090	Breeze
8	Myrtle Beach, South Carolina	2,990	Breeze

== Accidents and incidents ==
- On May 12, 1959, Capital Airlines Flight 983, a Lockheed L-049 Constellation touched down and landed and the captain groundlooped the aircraft due to ineffective braking. During the maneuver the Constellation skidded down a steep embankment and caught fire. One crewmember and one passenger died out of 44 on board.
- On August 10, 1968, Piedmont Airlines Flight 230 was on an ILS localizer-only approach to runway 23 when it struck trees 360 feet from the runway threshold. The aircraft continued and struck up-sloping terrain short of the runway in a nose-down attitude. The aircraft continued up the hill and onto the airport, coming to rest 6 feet beyond the threshold and 50 feet from the right edge of the runway. A layer of dense fog was obscuring the runway threshold and about half of the approach lights. Visual conditions existed outside the fog area. All three crew members and 32 of the 34 passengers died. The National Transportation Safety Board blamed the accident on an "unrecognized loss of altitude orientation during the final portion of an approach into shallow, dense fog." The disorientation was caused by a rapid reduction in the ground guidance segment available to the pilot at a point beyond which a go-around could be successfully effected.
- On January 19, 2010, PSA Airlines Canadair CRJ-200 N246PS on Flight 2495 to Charlotte, North Carolina on behalf of US Airways with 30 passengers and three crew, overran the runway following a rejected take-off at 16:13 local time (21:13 UTC). The aircraft was stopped by the EMAS at the end of the runway, sustaining substantial damage to its undercarriage.
- On May 5, 2017, Air Cargo Carriers Flight 1260 crashed after suffering a hard landing at CRW. Both the captain and first officer were killed in the accident. Early reports state that the left-wing made contact with the surface of Runway 5, separated from the fuselage, and the aircraft cartwheeled left off the runway and down a heavily wooded hillside. The National Transportation Safety Board cited in its final report the causes of "the flight crew's improper decision to conduct a circling approach contrary to the operator's standard operating procedures (SOP) and the captain's excessive descent rate and maneuvering during the approach, which led to inadvertent, uncontrolled contact with the ground. Contributing to the accident was the operator's lack of a formal safety and oversight program to assess hazards and compliance with SOPs and to monitor pilots with previous performance issues."

== See also ==
- List of airports in West Virginia
