= Bill Noe Flight School =

Medical school of Marshall University

Coordinates: 38°21′52″N 81°35′17″W

- Type: Public
- Established: 2021
- Parent institution: Marshall University
- Director: Nancy Ritter
- Faculty: 16
- Location: Charleston, West Virginia, USA
- Website: Official website

The Bill Noe Flight School is the flight school at Marshall University, located at the West Virginia Yeager International Airport in Charleston, West Virginia. The Bill Noe Flight School features a 12,000 sq ft. academic building, a hangar, and an aircraft parking apron.

== History ==
In 2021 the Bill Noe Flight School was founded, and named after Bill Noe, the former chief operating officer of NetJets.

== Academics ==
The school offers the following programs:

- Professional Pilot, B.S.
  - Also available at Wheeling and Martinsburg campuses
- Aviation Maintenance Technology, A.A.S.
