= Marshall University =

Public university in Huntington, West Virginia, US

Coordinates: 38.42508°N 82.42046°W

- Former name: List: Marshall Academy (1837–1858) Marshall College (1858–1867) State Normal School of Marshall College (1867–1938) Marshall College (1938–1961)
- Type: Public research university
- Established: 1837; 189 years ago
- Accreditation: HLC
- Academic affiliations: WVHEPC
- Endowment: $232.85 million (2025)
- President: Brad D. Smith
- Provost: Diane Petrella
- Faculty: 806
- Students: 13,239 (Fall 2025)
- Undergraduates: 9,975
- Postgraduates: 2,704
- Doctoral students: 560
- Location: Huntington, West Virginia, United States
- Campus: 100 acres (0.40 km^{2}); Small city
- Other campuses: Beckley; Point Pleasant; South Charleston
- Newspaper: The Parthenon
- Colors: Kelly green, white and black
- Nickname: Thundering Herd
- Sporting affiliations: NCAA Division I FBS – Sun Belt
- Mascot: Marco the Bison
- Website: www.marshall.edu

Marshall University is a public research university in Huntington, West Virginia, United States. It was founded in 1837 and is named after John Marshall, the fourth chief justice of the United States. The university is classified among "R2: Doctoral Universities – High research activity".

== History ==
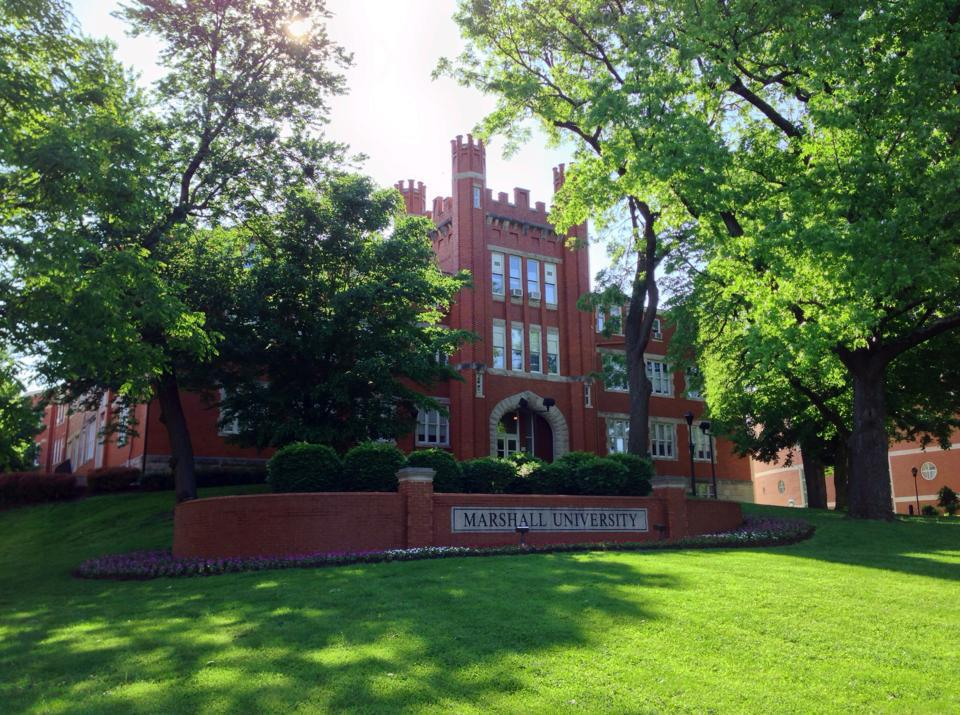
Old Main is the oldest building on campus and home to many of the university's administrative offices.

Marshall University was founded in 1837 as a private subscription school by residents of Guyandotte and the surrounding area. The landmark Old Main, which now serves as the primary administrative building for the university, was built on land known as Maple Grove, at the time the home of the Mount Hebron Church in what was then the state of Virginia. John Laidley, a local attorney, hosted the meeting which led to the founding of Marshall Academy, which was named after Laidley's friend, the eminent John Marshall who had served as the fourth chief justice of the United States from January 1801 until his death in July 1835.

On March 30, 1838, the institution was formally dedicated by the Virginia General Assembly as Marshall Academy; however this institution was not a college level institution as that was understood at that time. In 1858, the Virginia General Assembly changed the name to Marshall College, but this change still did not reflect its status as a true college. The Civil War closed the often financially challenged school for much of the 1860s.

On June 20, 1863, Cabell County, Virginia, was one of the 50 counties separated from Virginia at the height of the American Civil War to form the state of West Virginia, and the college fell within the new state. In 1867, the West Virginia Legislature re-established the institution as a teacher training facility and renamed it State Normal School of Marshall College.

=== 20th century ===
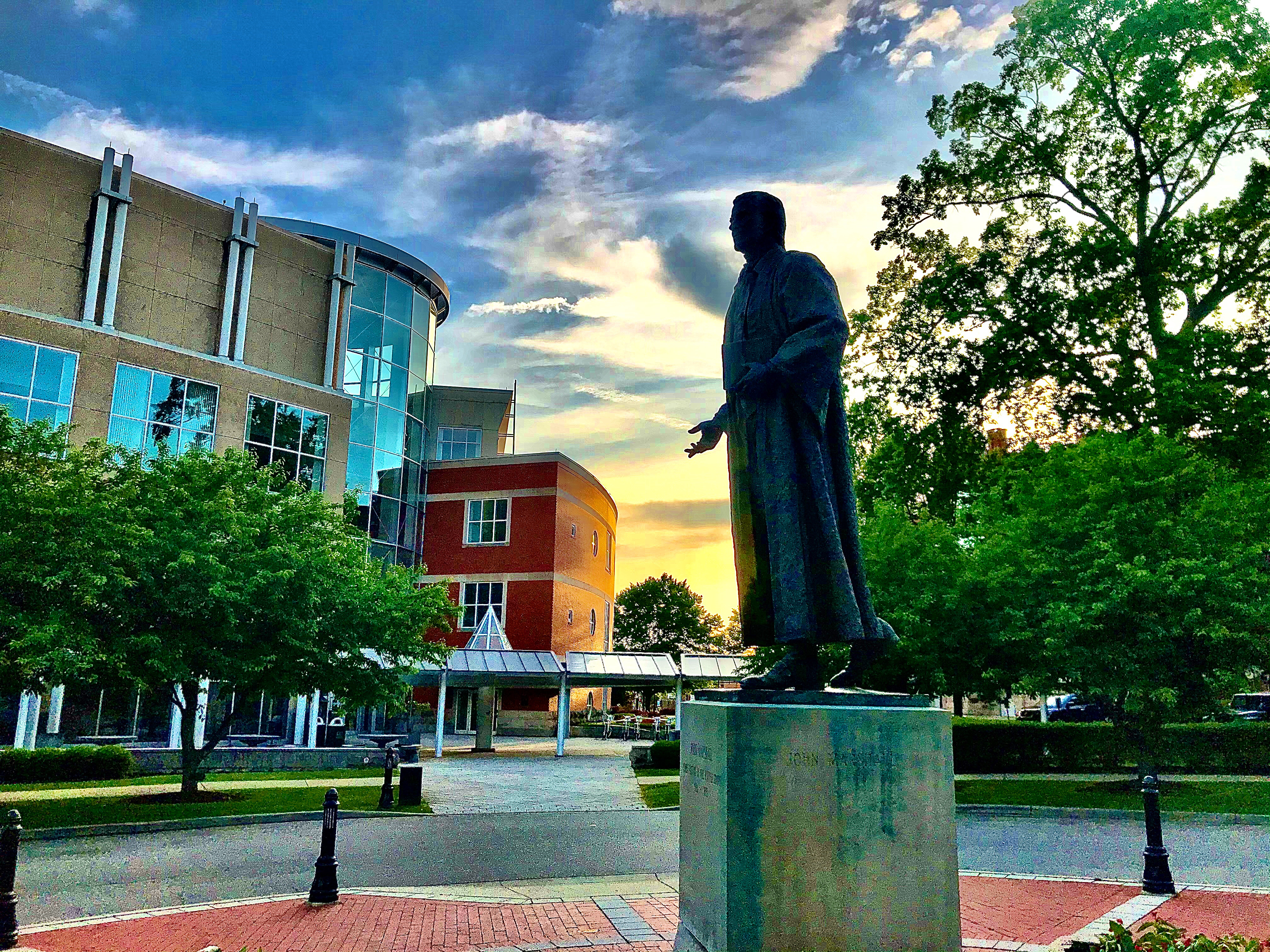
John Marshall statue in front of Drinko Library

With the exception of the Old Main building, expansion of the facilities and the college itself did not begin until 1907, when the West Virginia Board of Regents allowed the creation of new college-level departments. At that time, enrollment surpassed 1,000 students. The school began offering four-year degrees for the first time in 1920.

In 1937, the college suffered the effects of a devastating flooding by the Ohio River. Numerous structures were extensively flooded. Much of Huntington was also heavily damaged.

The West Virginia Board of Education authorized Marshall College in 1938 to offer the master's degree in six programs: chemistry, education, history, political science, psychology, and sociology, as the institution underwent another expansion. In that year the school was accredited as a "university level institution"; however, elevation to university status would remain a contentious political issue for decades to come. Further expansion accelerated after World War II.

On March 2, 1961, West Virginia Legislature elevated the college to university status, thus becoming Marshall University. Also in 1961, WMUL-FM began operations; it claims to be the first public radio station in West Virginia.

In 1969, the university's athletic program faced a number of scandals regarding recruiting violations and giving cash to athletes. Both the football and basketball coaches were fired; the teams were suspended from the Mid-American Conference.

==== 1970 football team airplane crash ====
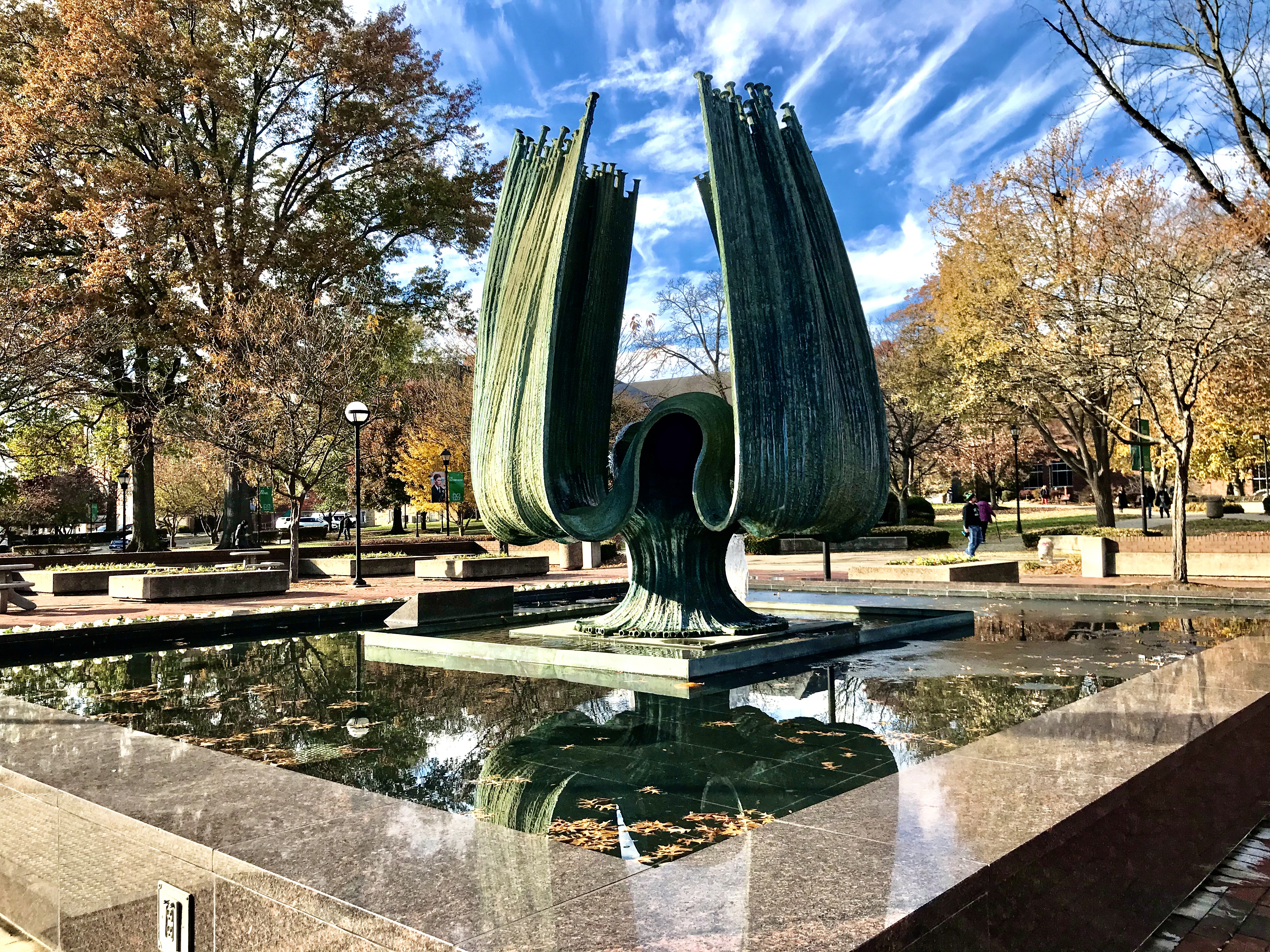
Memorial Fountain on the Student Center Plaza

On the evening of November 14, 1970, the Thundering Herd football team, along with coaches and fans, were returning home to Huntington from Kinston, North Carolina. The team had just lost a game 17–14 against the East Carolina University Pirates at Ficklen Stadium in Greenville, North Carolina. The chartered Southern Airways Flight 932 crashed on approach to the Tri-State Airport after clipping trees just west of the runway and impacting, nose-first, into a hollow. All 75 people on board were killed, including 37 team members and five coaches. Thirteen members of the team, as well as the members of the freshman football team, who were not eligible to play varsity under NCAA rules at that time, were not passengers.

The following season a new head coach, Jack Lengyel, was hired. The leaders of the "Young Thundering Herd" (to which the team officially changed its name for the 1971 season) were the few players who did not make the trip due to injury or disciplinary action. Fifteen sophomores from the previous year's freshman team were included, as well as a group of freshmen who were allowed to play at the varsity level after the NCAA granted a waiver to its rule barring them from doing so. Three years later, the NCAA would waive the rule for all schools. Completing the squad were players from other Marshall sports programs. They won only two of their ten games in 1971: a 15–13 victory against the Xavier Musketeers in the season's first home game, and a 12–10 homecoming game victory against the Bowling Green Falcons.

A fountain and plaza at the center of the school campus is dedicated to the victims of the crash. The water does not flow from November 14 until the first day of spring football practice the following year. The tragedy and its aftermath were the subject of several documentaries, including the award-winning Marshall University: Ashes to Glory.

On February 22, 2023, West Virginia governor Jim Justice signed House Bill 2412 into law, making November 14 an official Memorial Day in remembrance of the Marshall football plane crash across the state.

==== From 1970 ====
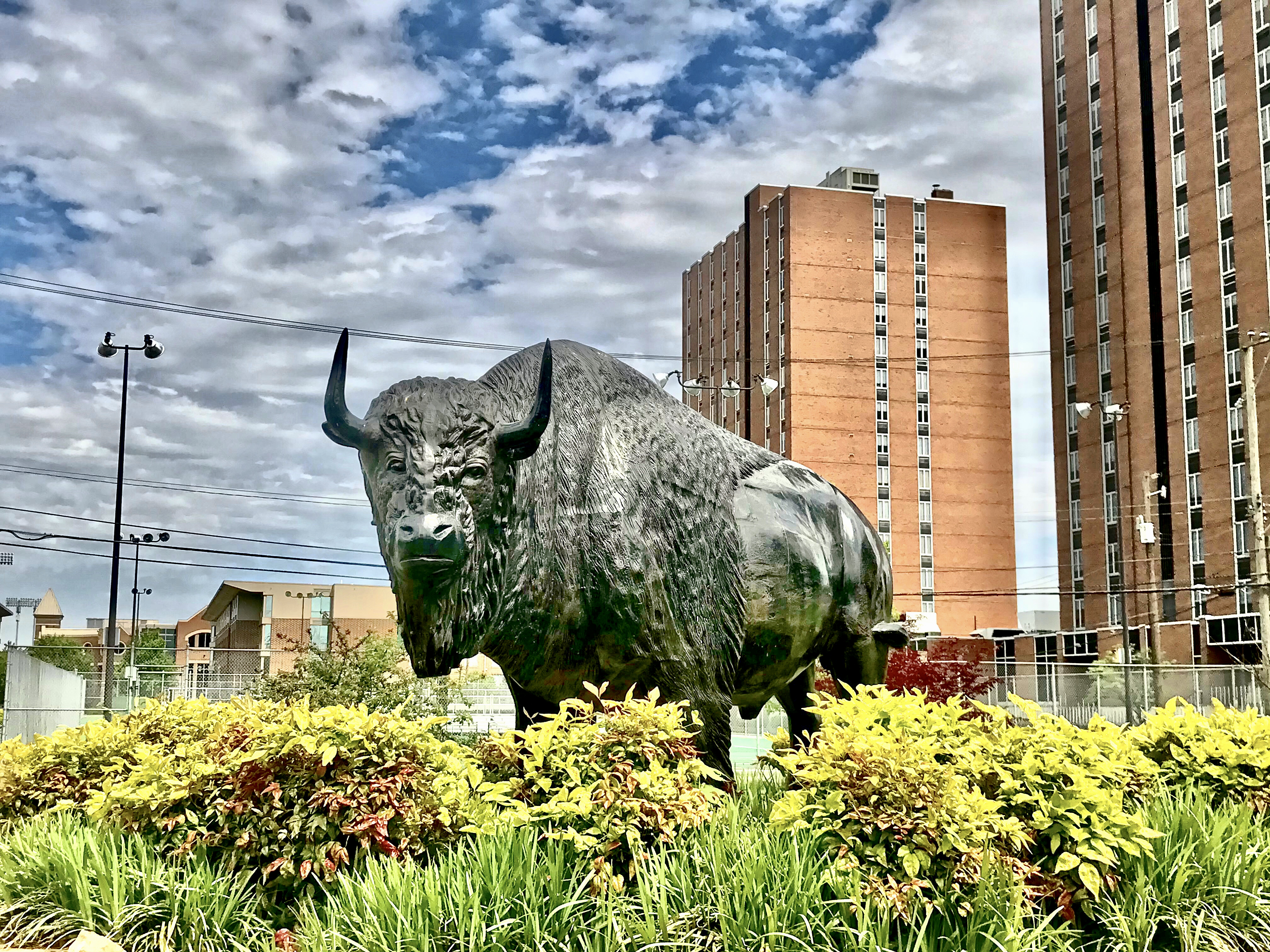
A statue of Marco the Bison, the university mascot, stands at Hodges Field.

In 1971 the Williamson and Logan campuses of Marshall University were combined by the West Virginia Legislature to form Southern West Virginia Community College (now Southern West Virginia Community and Technical College).

In 1977 the university founded its School of Medicine, the first professional school and the first doctoral program. Over the next 20 years the school would add doctoral programs in many fields. Twenty years later, in 1997, the West Virginia Graduate College became the graduate college of Marshall University. Its campus is in South Charleston, West Virginia. In 1998, the John Deaver Drinko Library opened on campus. In 1997, Marshall merged with the West Virginia University College of Graduate Studies (COGS), with the latter being renamed Marshall University Graduate College. In 2010 the university was authorized to begin offering undergraduate classes in South Charleston and renamed the facility Marshall University - South Charleston Campus.

Marshall's enrollment was 16,500 in 2004. In addition to the main campus in Huntington and the branch campus in South Charleston, West Virginia, the school maintains undergraduate centers in Gilbert, Point Pleasant, and Hurricane, West Virginia.

=== 21st century ===
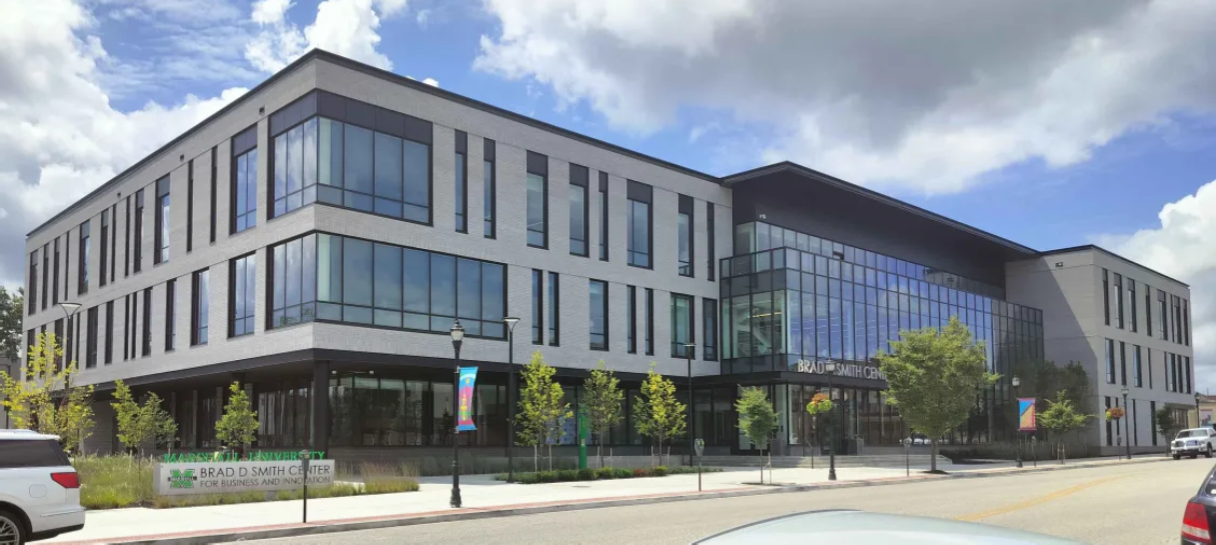
Brad D. Smith Center for Business and Innovation

In 2005, Stephen J. Kopp took over as Marshall University's president. Kopp died suddenly in 2014, with Gary G. White, former chairman of the Board of Governors, serving as interim president. Mississippi State University provost Jerome A. Gilbert was named the 37th president on October 20, 2015.

In August 2021, Marshall opened the Bill Noe Flight School at Yeager Airport in Charleston, West Virginia. The Bill Noe Flight School features a 12,000 sq ft. academic building, a hangar, and an aircraft parking apron. The school of aviation offers two undergraduate programs: commercial pilot: fixed wing and aviation maintenance. These programs began accepting students starting in Fall 2021, with additional programs being added in the future.

Other new programs offered by the university include a physician assistant program offered through the Joan C. Edwards School of Medicine, which accepted students in its inaugural class in January 2021.

On October 28, 2021, Brad D. Smith was appointed the university's 38th president, succeeding the retiring President Jerome Gilbert. Smith, retired CEO of financial software company Intuit, was already a major benefactor of the university.

In early 2022, after the first attacks during the Russo-Ukrainian War, Marshall University professors and staff Victor Fet, Anara Tabyshalievaand, Stefan Schoeberlein, and Kateryna Schray start the weekly podcast MUkraine, has been hosted every week since March 2, 2022 within a panelist Q&A format. The podcast has hosted over 120 guests that include university professors, philanthropists, charity organizations and Ukrainian refugees, volunteers and soldiers.

In May 2024 Marshall broke ground on a new 80,000 sq ft. Institute for Cyber Security building. The new facility will be a four-story building that will house cybersecurity technology and is scheduled to open by Fall 2026.

== Campus ==
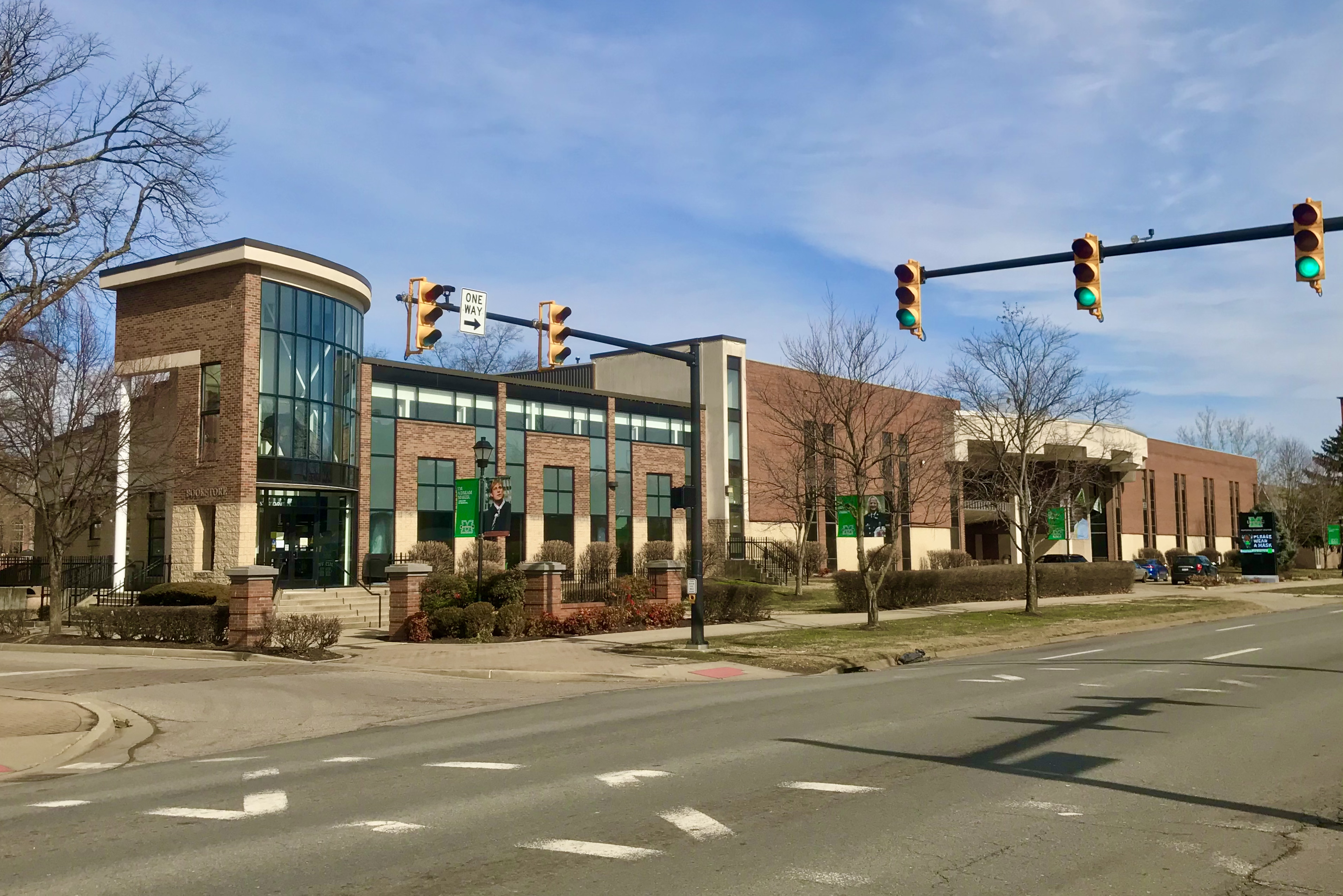
Memorial Student Center

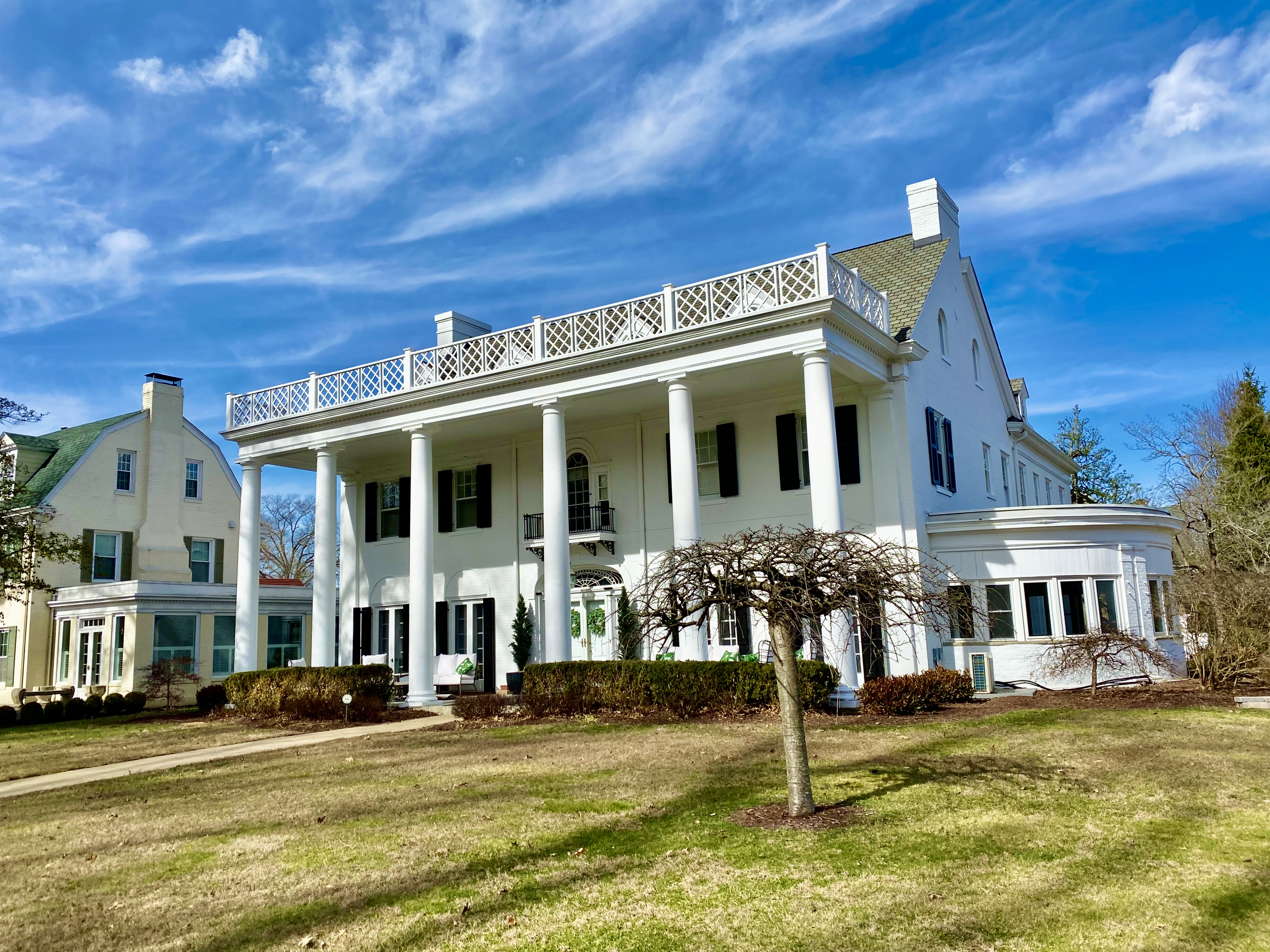
President's House

Old Main is a collection of five buildings joined at the center of the university's campus and has been seen as a symbol of the university. The original structure was completed in 1868, with four other additions that were completed at various intervals until 1907. Old Main is also home to the college's autism program first founded in 2002.

The Brad D. Smith Center for Business and Innovation opened in 2024 near Old Main to develop business ideas and projects created by Marshall University students.

The Robert C. Byrd Biotechnology Science Center is named after longtime U.S. Senator Robert C. Byrd, who was a proponent of the project and helped receive funding for its construction. The first floor contains two auditoriums, six teaching laboratories, numerous lecture rooms, and other research appendages.

== Academics ==
=== Undergraduate admissions ===
In 2024, Marshall University accepted 96.9% of undergraduate applicants, with those admitted having an average 3.68 high school GPA. The university does not require submission of standardized test scores, Marshall being a test optional school. Those accepted that submitted test scores had an average 930-1150 SAT score or an average 19-25 ACT score.

=== Organization and programs ===
Academic rankings

National
- Forbes: 450
- U.S. News & World Report: 315
- Washington Monthly: 261

Marshall University is organized into 11 degree-granting colleges or schools in addition to an honors college:

- College of Arts and Media
- Division of Aviation
- Elizabeth McDowell Lewis College of Business
- College of Education and Professional Development
- College of Engineering and Computer Sciences
- College of Health Professions
- College of Liberal Arts
- Joan C. Edwards School of Medicine
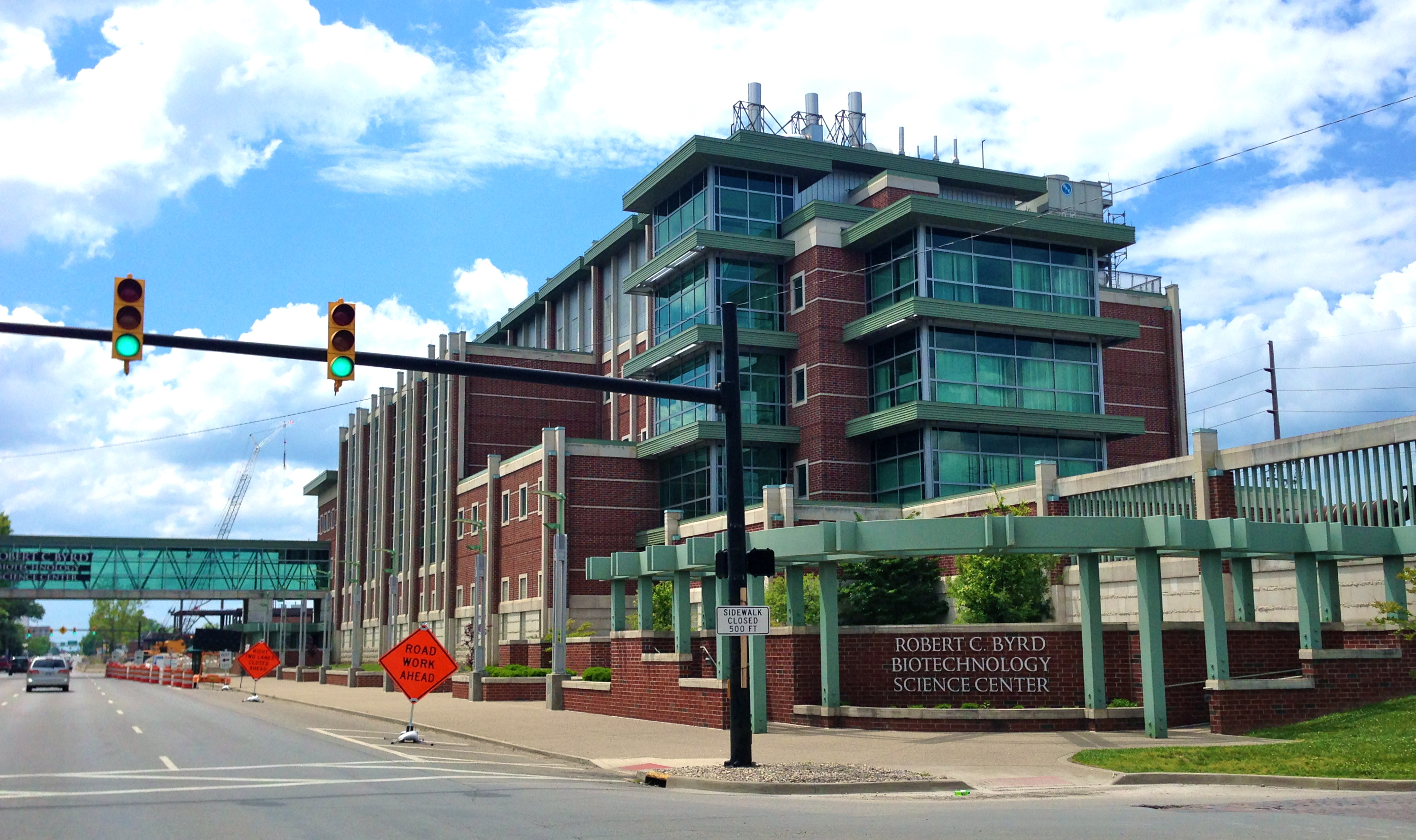
  Robert C. Byrd Biotechnology Science Center
- College of Science
- School of Pharmacy
- Honors College
- University College

In 2021, Marshall formed an aviation program which includes the Bill Noe Flight School, awarding a B.S. in commercial aviation as a professional pilot; and an A.A.S. in aviation maintenance technology. The flight school is based at the Yeager Airport in Charleston, West Virginia; the aviation maintenance program is based at Tri-State Airport in Huntington. In 2024, the flight school opened a second location at Eastern West Virginia Regional Airport in Martinsburg, West Virginia, and a cooperative program with West Liberty University using the Wheeling Ohio County Airport. All schools are FAA-certified.

The school's general engineering program was closed in 1970 but was re-established with a graduate program in 1993, and a general engineering undergraduate program in 2006.

Marshall has granted master's degrees since 1938. The university began granting doctoral degrees in 1994. Marshall now offers a Ph.D. in Biomedical Sciences, an EdD in Educational Leadership or Curriculum and Instruction, and professional doctorates in Nurse Anesthesia, Pharmacy, Psychology, and Physical Therapy.

=== Divisional campuses ===
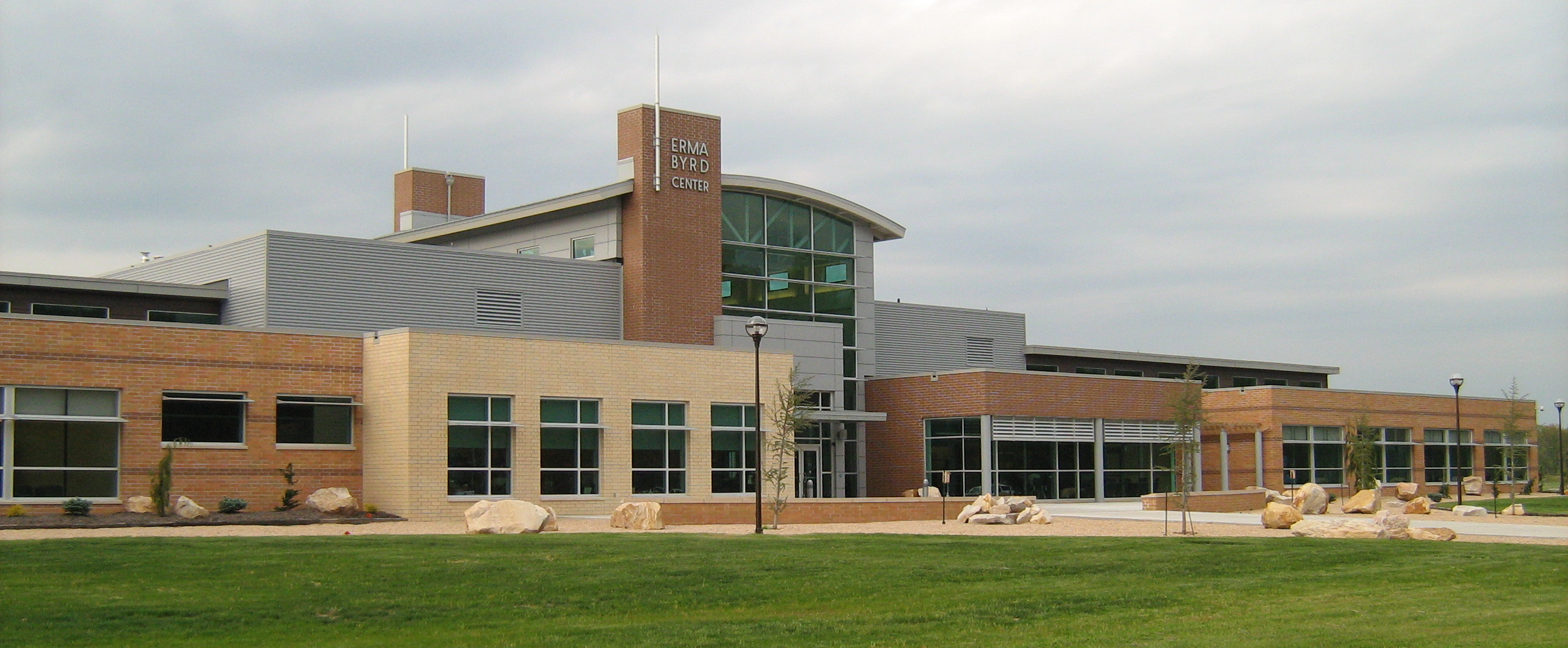
Erma Byrd Higher Education Center, on the Beckley Campus

Marshall has three divisional campuses.

- Marshall University – Beckley Campus
- Marshall University – Point Pleasant Campus
- Marshall University – South Charleston Campus

=== Scholarship programs ===
The Society of Yeager Scholars is the highest academic scholarship offered at Marshall University, named in honor of Chuck Yeager, the first recorded pilot to break the sound barrier. Members of the society are selected through a competitive application and interview process from high school seniors. The core curriculum is designed to assist each Yeager Scholar in developing skills in analysis, synthesis, and critical thinking. Each scholar will be expected to demonstrate superior skills in written and oral communication. To remain in the program, each student must maintain a cumulative 3.5 grade point average. Those who complete all academic requirements are awarded a Yeager medallion containing flecks of the same metal as the Bell X-1.

The John Marshall Scholars Program is an academic scholarship program that covers a majority of the cost of education for member students at Marshall. The program affords a rigorous academic program and provides a full tuition/fee waiver and stipend to students with a composite ACT score of 30 or higher who have been accepted to the university. Students must maintain a 3.5 grade point average to retain their scholarship.

== Athletics ==
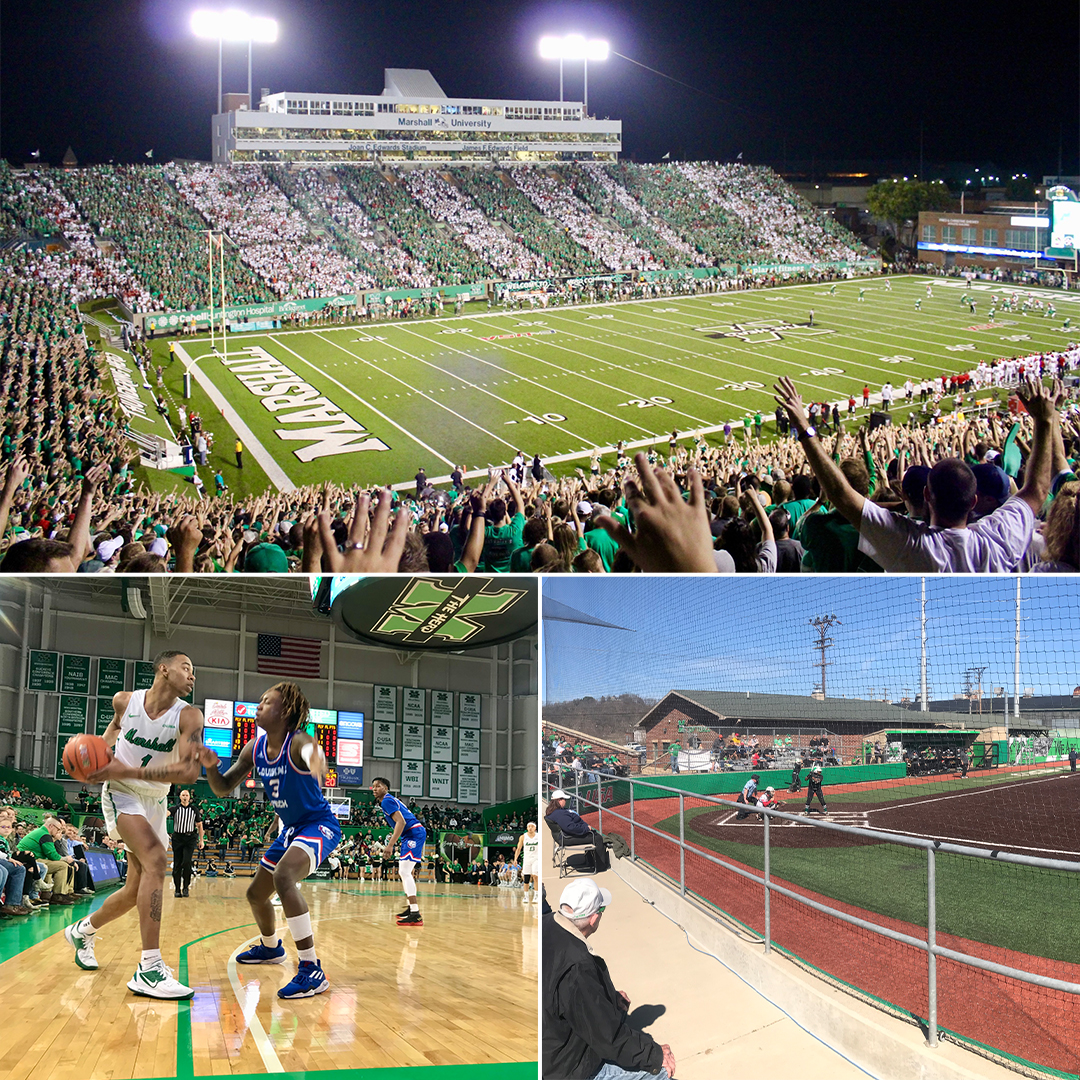
Clockwise: Joan C. Edwards Stadium, Dot Hicks Field, Cam Henderson Center

Marshall's athletic teams are known as the Thundering Herd. The school colors are kelly green and white. Marshall participates in NCAA Division I (FBS for football) as a member of the Sun Belt Conference. The name Thundering Herd came from a Zane Grey novel released in 1925, and a silent movie of the same name two years later. It was originally used by The Herald-Dispatch sports editor Carl "Duke" Ridgley, but many other nicknames were suggested over the next thirty years including Boogercats, Big Green, Green Gobblers, Rams, and Judges. In 1965, students, alums and faculty settled on Thundering Herd in a vote, and Big Green was given to the athletic department's fund-raising wing.

Marshall is home to 15 NCAA Division I teams that compete within the Sun Belt. Sports at the school include women's softball, swimming and diving, tennis, volleyball, and track and field; men's football, baseball; and teams for both genders in basketball, cross country, golf, and soccer.

Marshall began playing football in 1895 and has a long tradition as a football school. The plane crash on November 14, 1970, whose 75 victims included most of the 1970 Thundering Herd football team, continues to have a lasting impact on the university and Huntington community.

In 2020, the men's soccer team won the National Championship after defeating Indiana, 1–0, in the 2020 NCAA Division I men's soccer championship game.

== Student life ==
Undergraduate demographics as of Fall 2023
Race and ethnicity	Total
White	78%
Unknown	7%
Black	6%
Two or more races	4%
Hispanic	3%
Asian	2%
International student	1%
Economic diversity
Low-income (Note: The percentage of students who received an income-based federal Pell grant intended for low-income students.)	44%
Affluent (Note: The percentage of students who are a part of the American middle class at the bare minimum.)	56%

Marshall is home to over 200 student organizations and clubs.

Student media includes an on-campus radio station WMUL-FM 88.1, and The Parthenon, the student newspaper.

There are 15 chapters of fraternities and sororities on campus. Disciplinary problems became national news in 2014 when The Atlantic published an article about drug and alcohol abuse in Greek chapters on campus. In 2021, the university closed all of them temporarily after allegations of violations of COVID-19 measures.

=== Campus Activities Board ===
The student-run Campus Activities Board organizes free campus-wide events. Also available to students is the Marshall Artists Series, which brings Broadway, dance, music, comedy, and opera to the university, and two international film festivals. Students can obtain free tickets to athletics, Marshall Artists Series productions and to theater productions at the Joan C. Edwards Performing Arts Center.

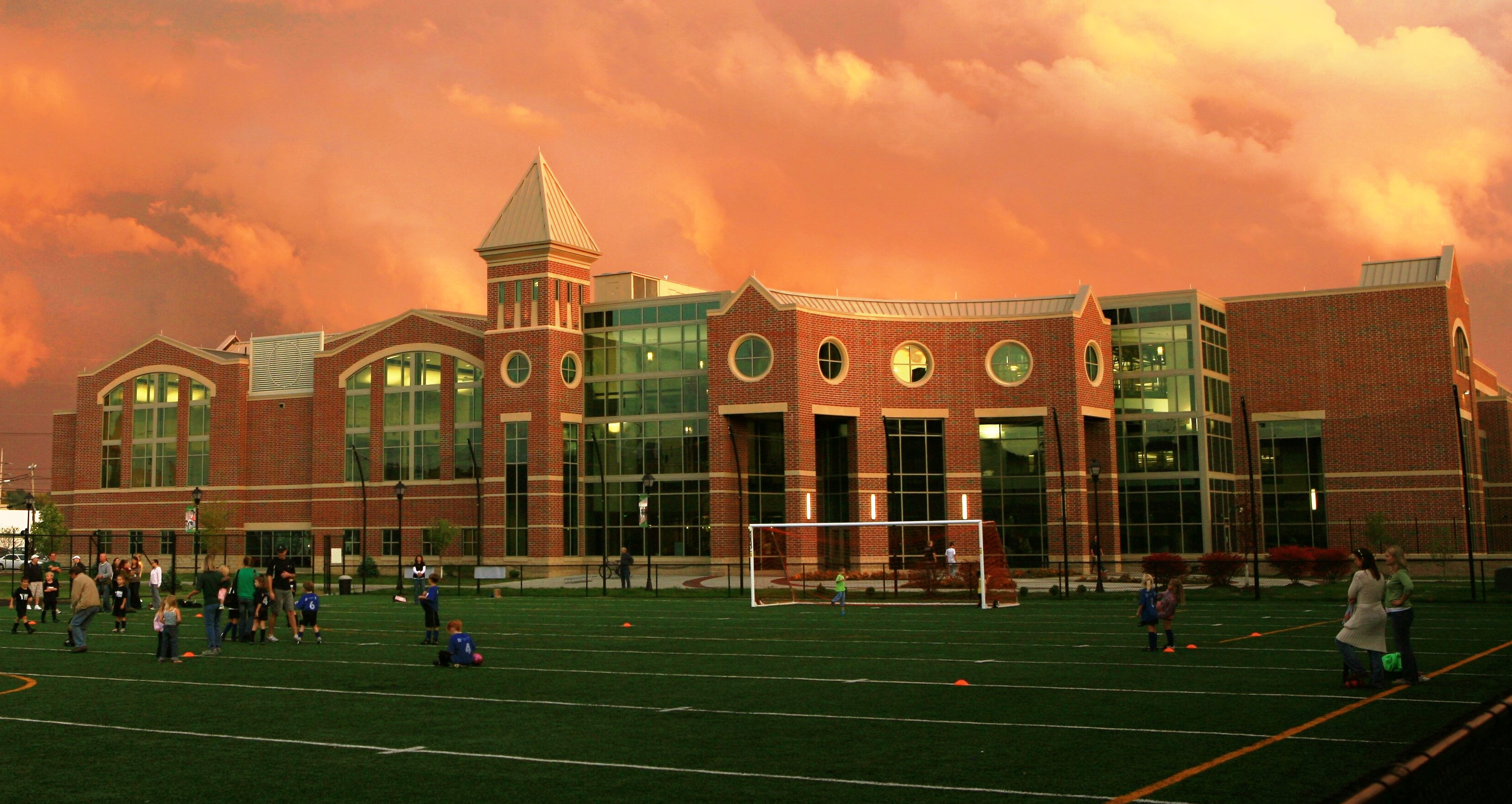
Marshall Rec Center

=== Campus services and residence halls ===
Nicknamed The Rec, the 123,000 sq ft (11,400 m^{2}) recreation center opened in 2009. The facility features an aquatic center with a spa, 3 lap lanes, a vortex whirlpool, and a leisure area. There are ten residence halls on the main campus, with additional housing on the Health Science campus.

== Notable people ==
=== Notable alumni ===
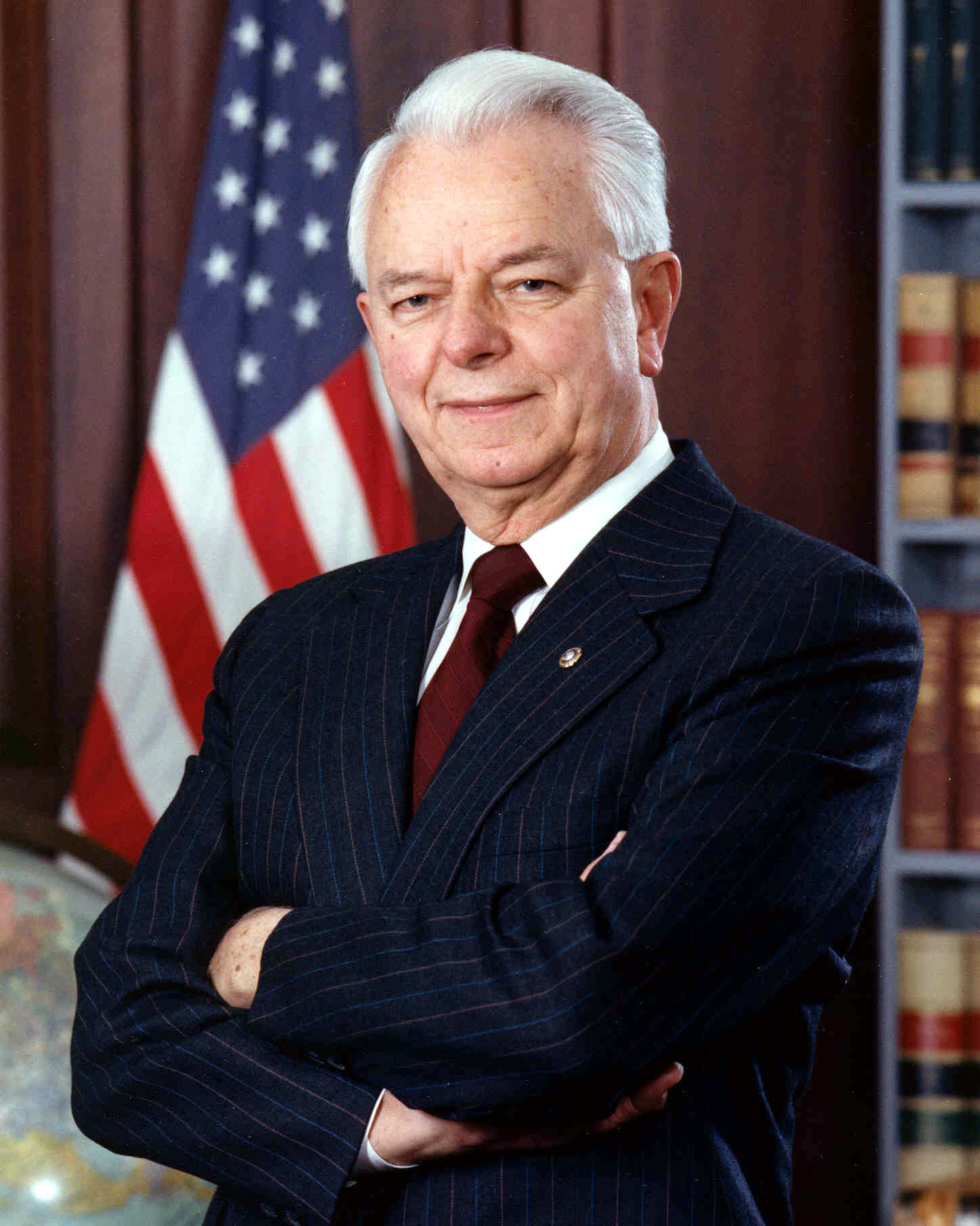
Robert C. Byrd, longest serving United States Senator in history, former U.S. representative for West Virginia

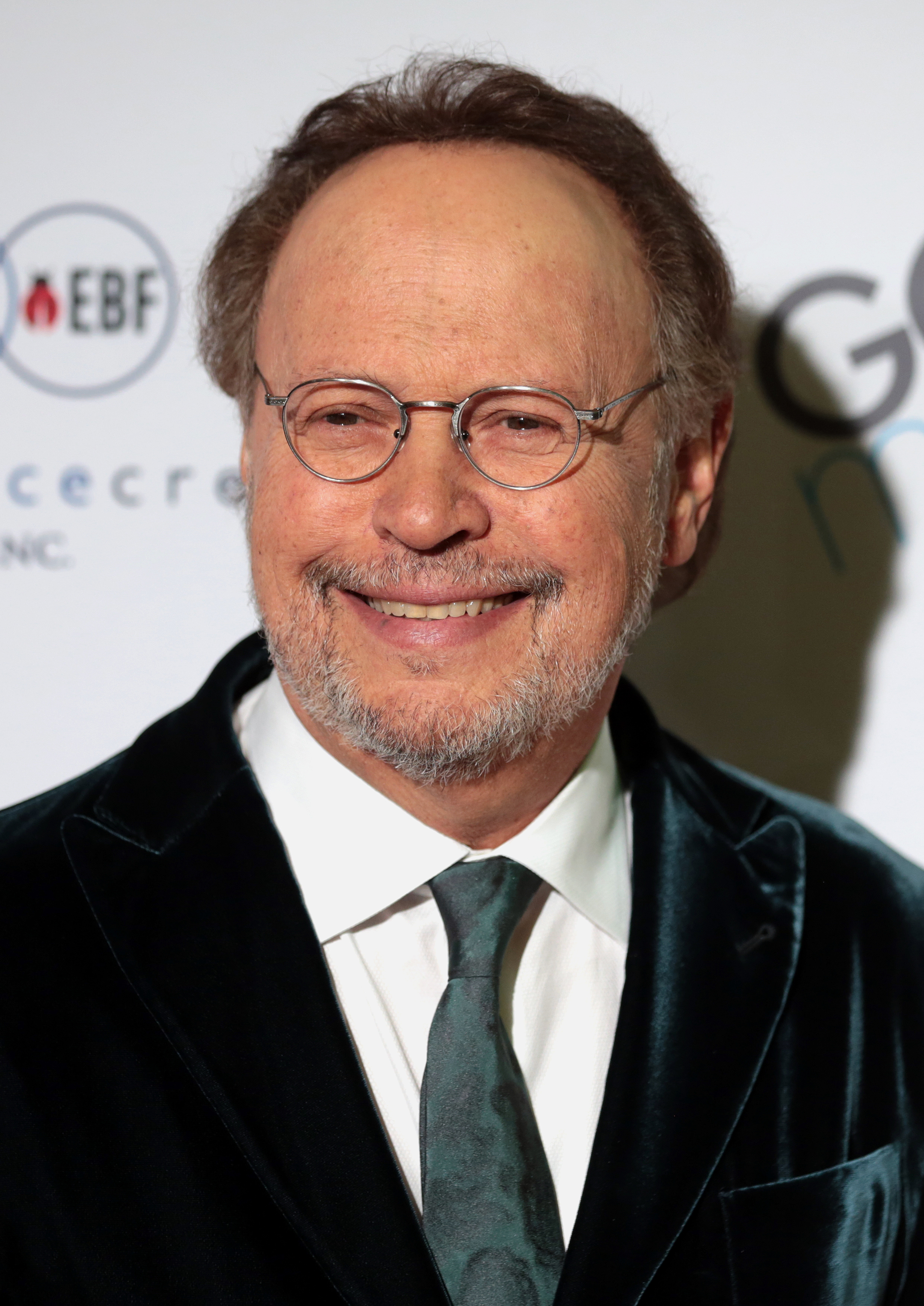
Billy Crystal (left after freshman year), 6x Emmy winner, 1x Tony winner 9x host of the Oscars, played as Jodie Dallas in Soap

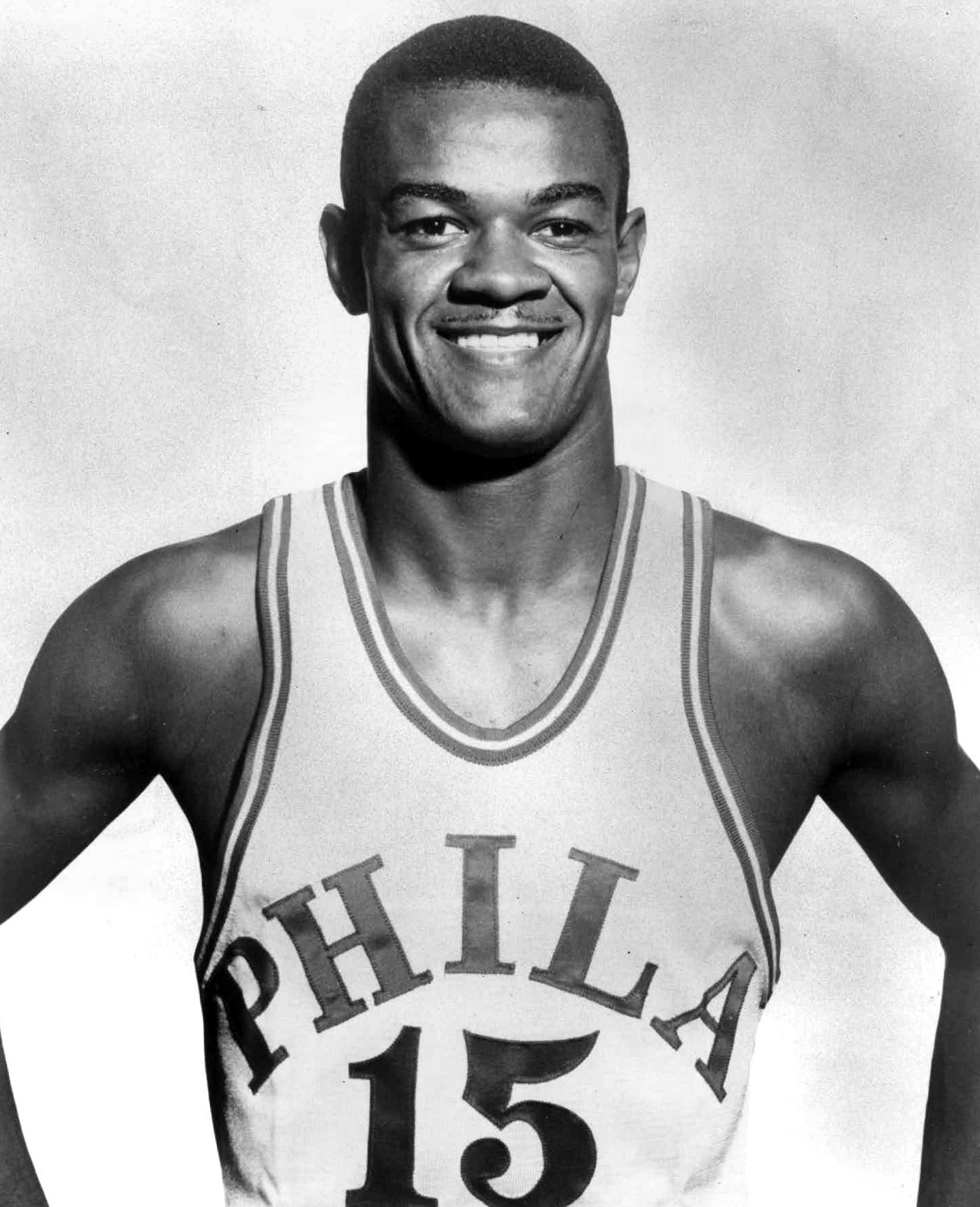
Hal Greer, member of NBA's 50th and 75th anniversary teams, Basketball Hall of Famer

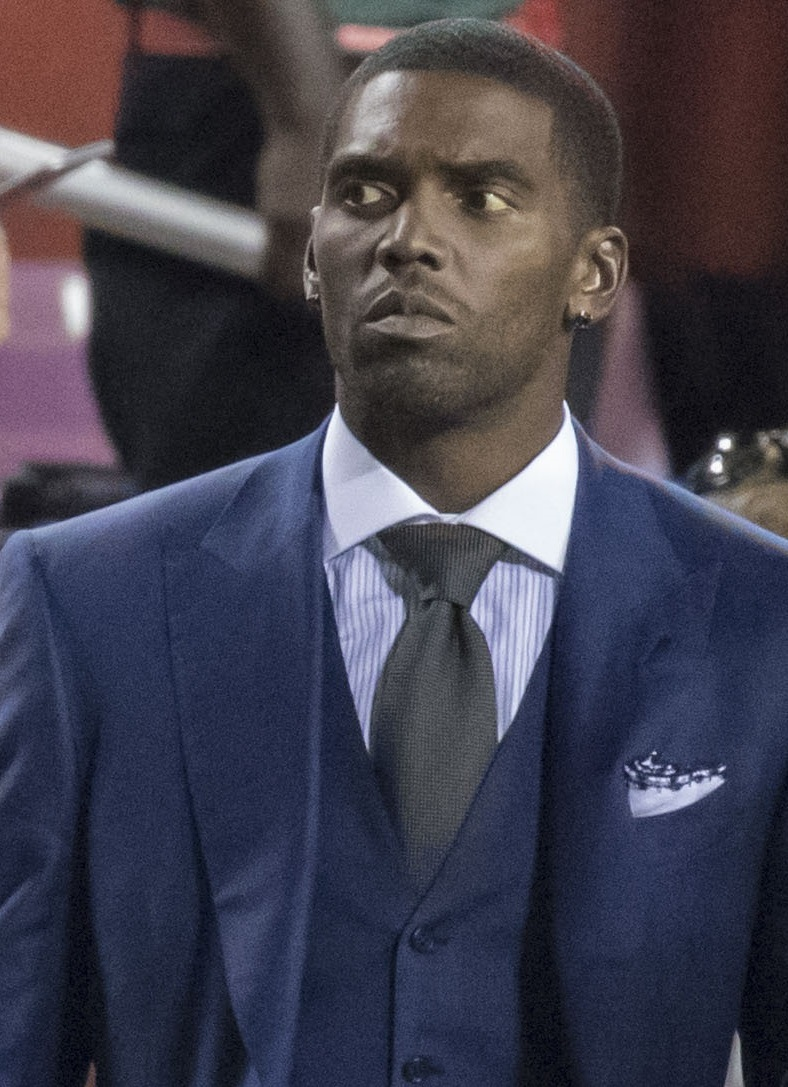
Randy Moss (attended 1996–1997), NFL record holder for most receiving touchdowns in a season, Pro Football Hall of Famer

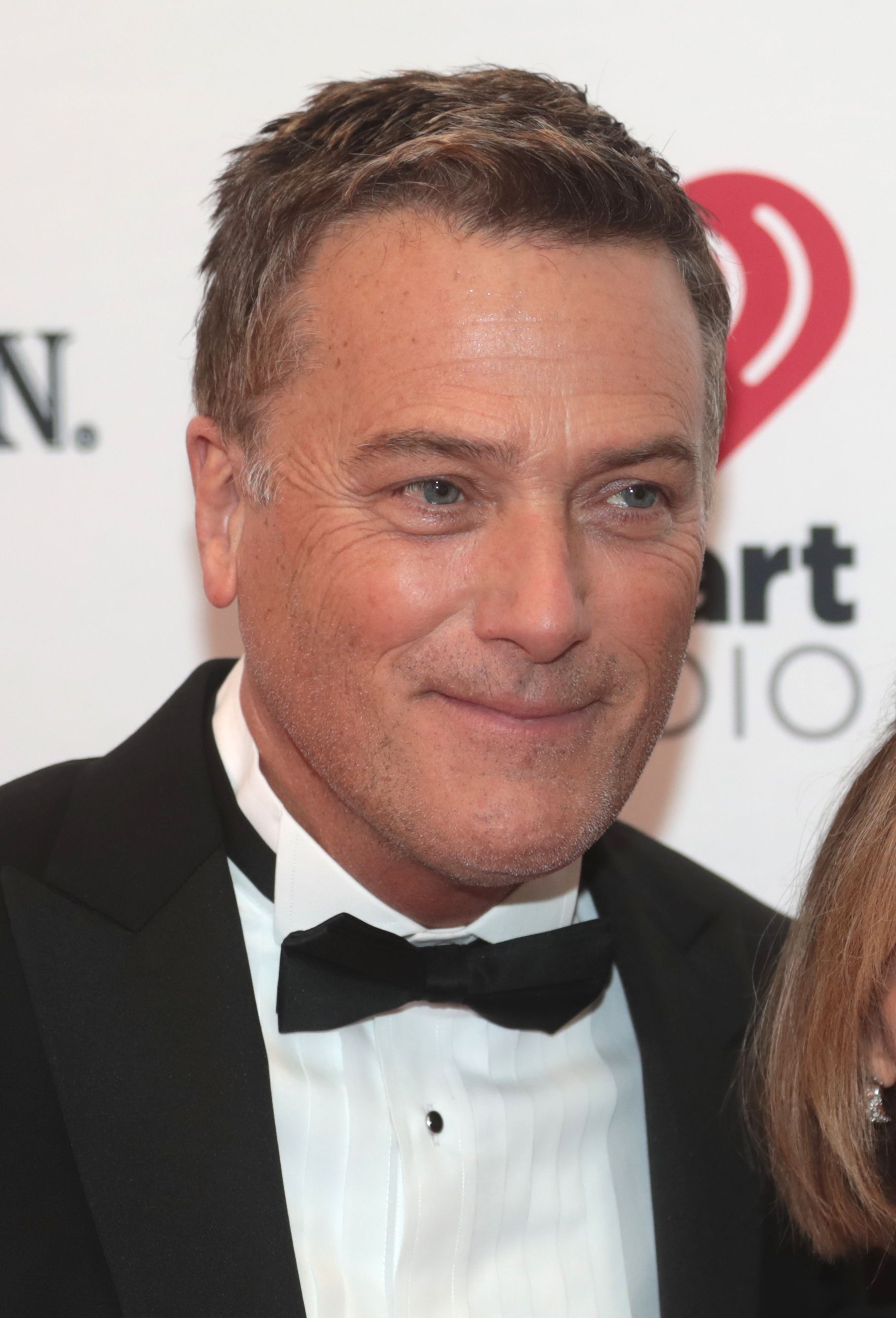
Michael W. Smith (dropped out after one semester), 3x Grammy winner, 54x Dove Award winner, artist behind Place in This World

=== Notable faculty ===
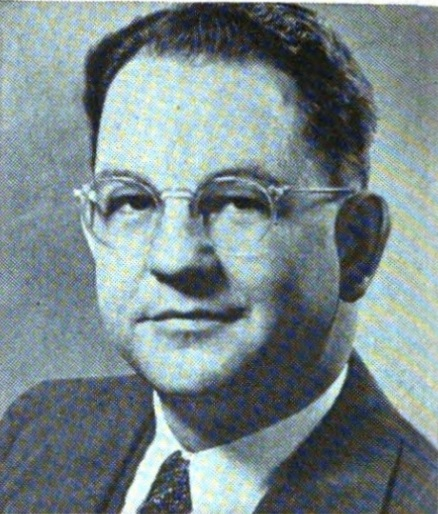
Maurice G. Burnside, former professor of political science, former United States House of Representatives

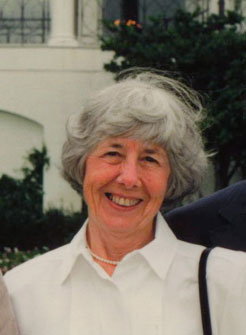
Ruth C. Sullivan, founded and ran the West Virginia Autism Training Center, founder of ASA

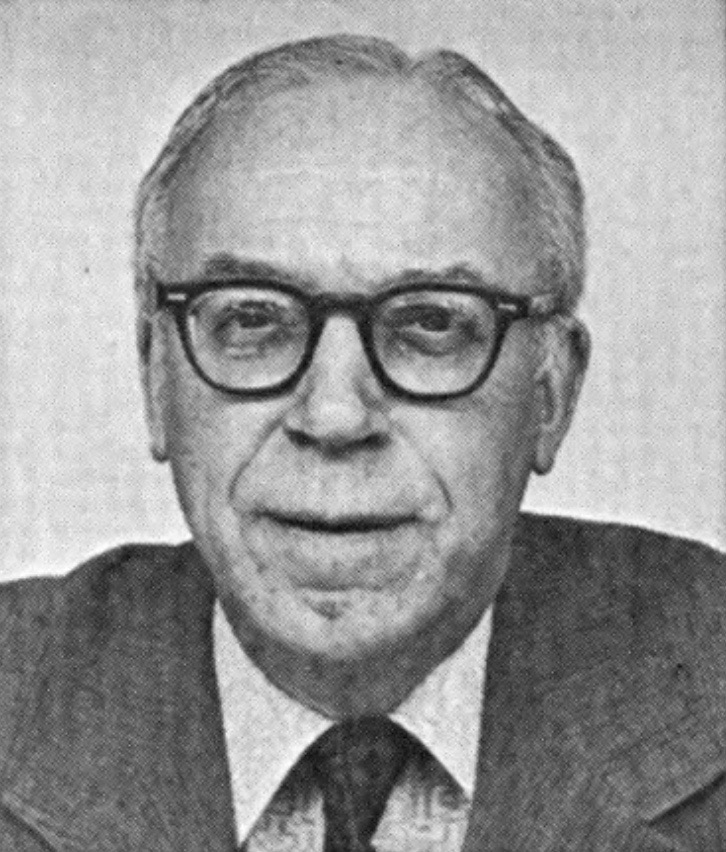
Ken Hechler, former professor of political science, former United States House of Representatives

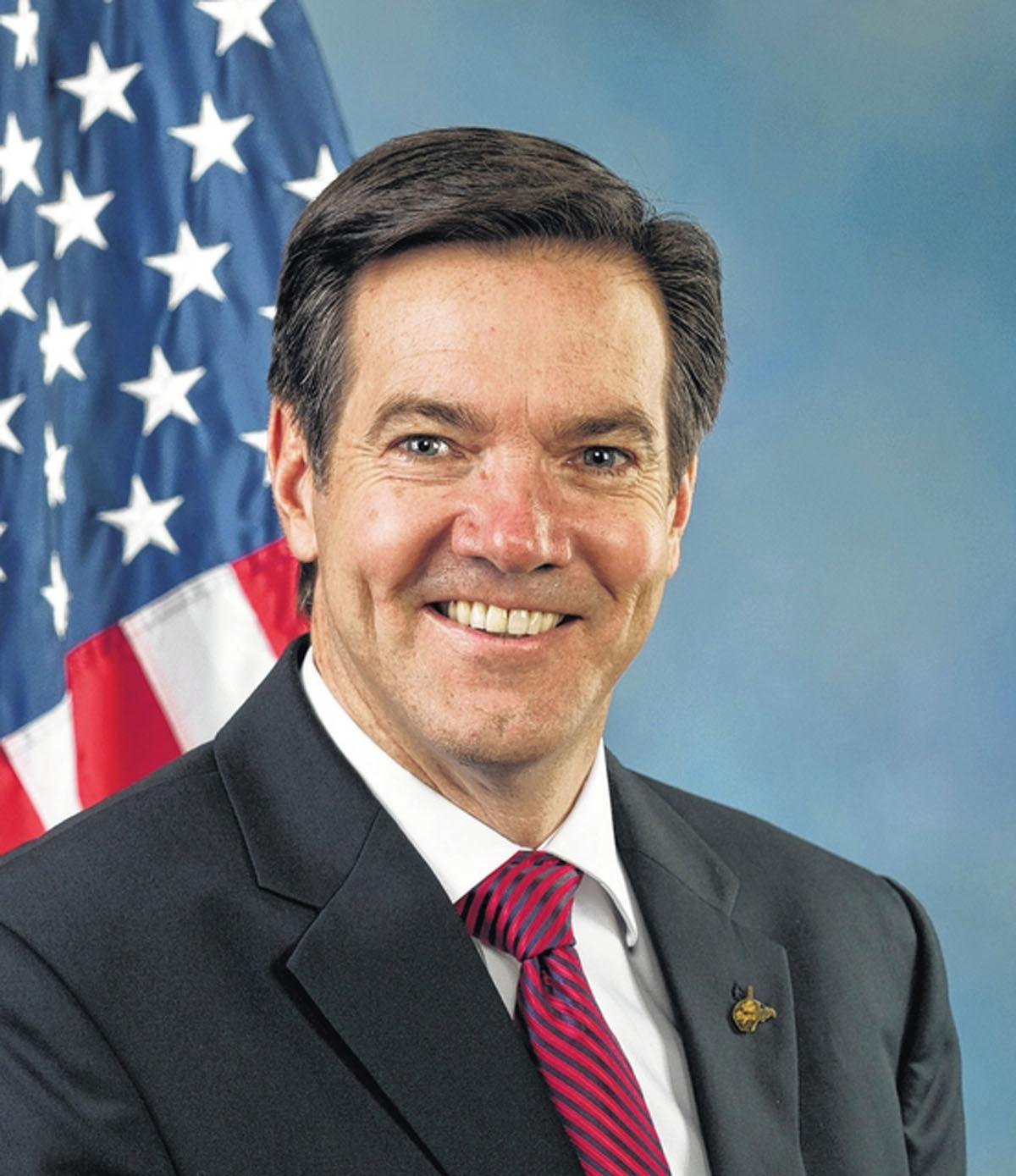
Evan Jenkins, former professor of commercial law, former United States House of Representatives

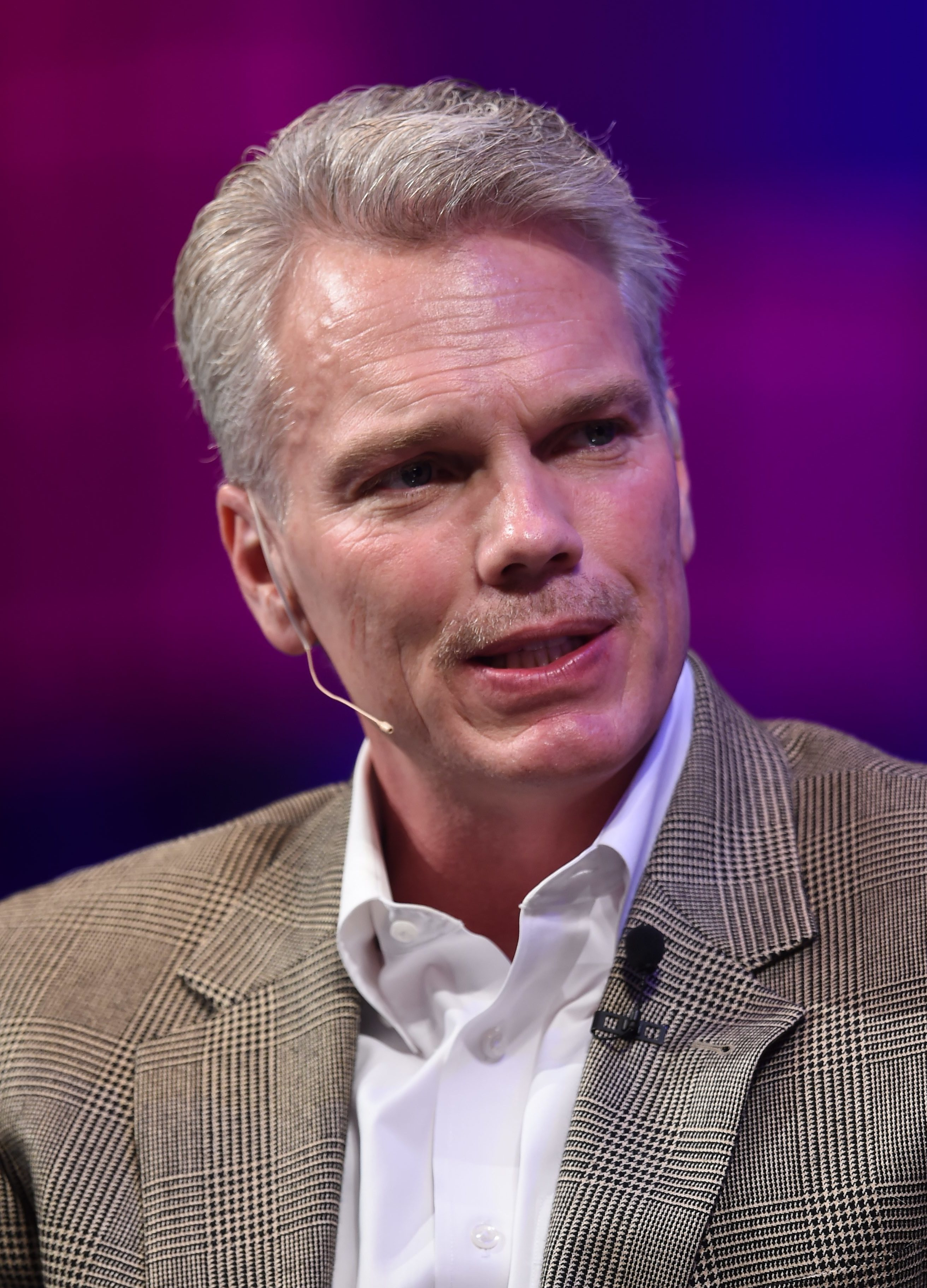
Brad D. Smith, current president of Marshall University, former CEO of Intuit, current Amazon board of directors

== See also ==
- Buildings at Marshall University
- Marshall University – South Charleston Campus
