= John Marshall Scholars =

Academic scholarship program

The John Marshall Scholars Program is an academic scholarship program that covers a majority of the cost of education for member students at Marshall University. Named to honor the Chief Justice of the United States John Marshall, the program affords a rigorous academic program and provides a full tuition/fees waiver and stipend to students with a composite ACT score of 30 or higher who have been accepted to the university. Students must maintain a 3.5 GPA in order to retain their scholarship.

John Marshall Scholars complete a program of interdisciplinary honors seminars and departmental honors courses. Examples of these interdisciplinary seminars include:

- Threads of Bale, exposing students to the literature and music of suffering in Northern Ireland and Appalachia.
- The History of Science, exploring the nature of scientific revolutions and their impact on society
- Global Terrorism
- Literary Ornithology
- Tolkien and Film
- Writing Biography: Franklin D. Roosevelt
- Post-Colonial Theory and Literature
- The American Constitution
- Endangered Species: Genetics and Policy
- The Roosevelts: The Years Before the White House
- Tests, Tests, and More Tests
- Castro's Cuba and the American Imagination

== See also ==
- Society of Yeager Scholars: another scholarship at Marshall University.
