= Piedmont Airlines Flight 230 =

1968 fatal crash of a Fairchild FB-227B in the United States

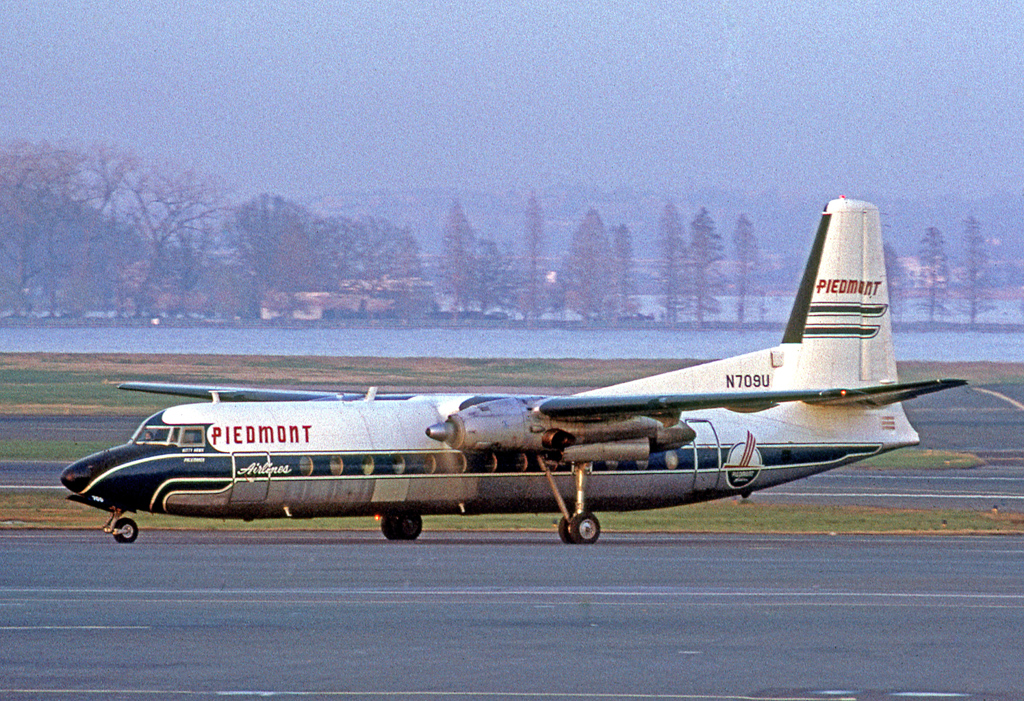
- A Fairchild FH-227B of Piedmont, similar to the aircraft involved

Accident
- Date: August 10, 1968
- Summary: Controlled flight into terrain
- Site: 360 ft from the threshold of runway 23 at Charleston-Kanawha County Airport

Aircraft
- Aircraft type: Fairchild Hiller FH-227B
- Operator: Piedmont Airlines (1948-1989)
- IATA flight No.: PI230
- ICAO flight No.: PAI230
- Call sign: PIEDMONT 230
- Registration: N712U
- Flight origin: Louisville International Airport, Kentucky, United States
- 1st stopover: Cincinnati/Northern Kentucky Airport, Kentucky, United States
- Last stopover: Charleston-Kanawha County Airport, West Virginia, United States
- Destination: Roanoke–Blacksburg Regional Airport, Virginia, United States
- Occupants: 37
- Passengers: 34
- Crew: 3
- Fatalities: 35
- Injuries: 2
- Survivors: 2

Piedmont Airlines Flight 230 was a scheduled domestic passenger flight within the United States of America operating from Louisville International Airport in Kentucky to Roanoke–Blacksburg Regional Airport in Virginia with stopovers at Cincinnati/Northern Kentucky International Airport and Charleston-Kanawha County Airport. On August 10, 1968, the aircraft operating the route, a Fairchild Hiller FH-227B crashed at approximately 08:57 local time, 360 ft short of runway 23 at Charleston, killing 35 of the 37 people on board.

== Background ==
=== Aircraft ===
The aircraft involved, manufactured on August 7, 1967, was a Fairchild FH-227B registered as N712U with serial number 557. The aircraft had logged 2,197 hours and 3 minutes of flying time and it was equipped with two Rolls-Royce Dart 532-7 engines with Dowty Rotol propellers. It was delivered to Piedmont Airlines on November 3, 1967.

=== Crew ===
In command was 40-year-old Captain Gene A. Sugg who had logged a total of 6,884 hours of flying time, including 2,809 hours logged on the Fairchild FH-227B. He joined Piedmont Airlines on August 1, 1955. His co-pilot was 34-year-old John F. Messick who had logged a total of 3,722 hours of flying time, 403 hours of which were logged on the Fairchild FH-227B. He joined Piedmont Airlines on September 19, 1966.

== Accident ==
From their stopover at Cincinnati/Northern Kentucky International Airport, Flight 230 would fly to Charleston-Kanawha County Airport, then fly to Roanoke–Blacksburg Regional Airport within the state of Virginia. The flight took off from Cincinnati at 8:05 CDT, and planned to land at 8:57. The weather at Charleston was reported to be foggy with low visibility near the threshold, so the crew attempted an ILS approach, but without a glideslope. At 8:52, Flight 230 was cleared to land on runway 23. At 8:57, at about 360 ft from the runway threshold, the aircraft struck a steep hill while attempting a go-around. The plane bounced back up into the air, now on fire and missing part of the wing. Leaning to the right, the aircraft descended until they ended up off to the right of runway 23. During this, two passengers were ejected from the aircraft, 27 year old Tom Voignier and 19 year old Barb Schiller.

Barb recalled that when the airplane crashed, she “blacked out” and woke up with “foam all over us”. Tom shared in an interview later in 2008 that his injuries consisted of a crushed vertebra, internal bleeding, multiple torn ligaments within his right knee, a broken right ankle, and a broken neck. Miraculously, he never ended up becoming paralyzed despite the neck wounds.

== Investigation ==
Just a year before the accident, the National Transportation Safety Board was founded to replace the Civil Aeronautics Board. However, this did not play a role in the investigation and its outcome. The investigation lasted nearly a year, with the final report being released on August 4, 1969. The final report listed 6 findings:

1. There was no failure or malfunction of the aircraft, powerplants, propellers, or other systems.
2. The crew was properly certified and qualified for the flight.
3. The aircraft was being operated in visual meteorological conditions until approximately 6 seconds before the crash, when it entered a shallow fog overlying the approach lights and the approach end of Runway 23.
4. Visual range in the final portion of the approach zone and over the Runway 23 threshold was 500 feet or less in the fog.
5. Because of the visual guidance segment available in the initial part of the approach, the pilot would have no way of judging the visual range in fog until the moment of penetration.
6. Descent below MI% into the restricted visibility was permissible under present regulations.

With these findings, the NTSB was able to rule that the accident was the fault of the pilots. The probable cause states:

The Safety Board determines that the probable cause of this accident was an unrecognized loss of altitude orientation during the final portion of an approach into shallow, dense fog. The disorientation was caused by a rapid reduction in the ground guidance segment available to the pilot, at a point beyond which a go-around could not be successfully effected.
