= Society of Yeager Scholars =

Scholarship offered at Marshall University

The Society of Yeager Scholars is the name of the highest academic scholarship offered at Marshall University, named in honor of Chuck Yeager, the first recorded pilot to break the sound barrier.

== General information ==
The scholarship was established to elevate the quality of academics at Marshall University and to honor Yeager, a local native who did not have the opportunity to attend college.

The Society of Yeager Scholars is a part of the Marshall University Honors College. Academic policy for the Yeager Scholars program is guided by a steering committee composed of university faculty. The chair of the steering committee and the dean of the Honors College have a role in developing the curriculum, administering the budget, coordinating the international aspects of the program, and recruiting and advising of the scholars.

A board of directors, which includes politicians, business leaders, and former students, has been established to advise on policy, to promote the society, to assist in recruiting students, and to be active in fundraising. Permanent members of the board of directors are the president of Marshall University as well as the vice-president for academic affairs and the vice-president for institutional advancement of the university. The Governor of West Virginia is an ex-officio member of the board.

Funding for the Society of Yeager Scholars comes primarily from private money. An endowment in excess of $9.2 million supports the Yeager Scholars and is administered through the Marshall University Foundation.

== Membership ==
Members of the society are selected through a highly competitive interview process from high school seniors from throughout the United States. The process of selecting Yeager Scholars begins with an application made directly to the program and submitted by December 1 of each year. The application consists of information about each student's extracurricular activities, honors and awards, and includes personal essays. Each application must be accompanied by three letters of reference and a transcript of high school grades.

The applications are screened by a special committee of faculty and administrators and are evaluated on a system that takes into consideration scores on the ACT and/or SAT tests, cumulative grade point average in high school, range of extracurricular activities, the nature of awards and honors achieved, and the information contained in the letters of reference. As a result of the screening a number of applicants are invited to become semifinalists and are interviewed at locations near their home on a Saturday in late January.

The results of the semi-finalist interviews are then tallied, and a number of semi-finalists are then invited to become finalists and to be interviewed at the Marshall University campus in Huntington, West Virginia in late February. The finalist weekend includes (in addition to two sets of interviews) a tour of the university campus, the opportunity to meet with faculty from departments in which the finalist might wish to major, the chance to watch a home basketball game in the Henderson Center (depending on the basketball schedule), and the opportunity to talk informally with the current scholars and with the staff of the Yeager program. The weekend is designed to give the finalists a chance to get acquainted with Marshall University and the Yeager Scholars program and to give the selection committee the opportunity to determine which of the finalists will be asked to become Yeager Scholars. Those selected to become Yeager Scholars will have until early April to accept the Society's invitation.

Those chosen receive a four-year scholarship that includes full tuition and fees, full room and board, study at Oxford University, a stipend for textbooks and supplies, $7000 for an additional study abroad experience, and the use of a personal computer while he or she is enrolled in the program.

== Academic program ==
The academic program provided each Yeager Scholar is rigorous and demanding. The program consists of a number of elements:

- A core of four interdisciplinary seminars, one each semester for the first two years. The seminars will cover communication and computers; humanities, texts and values; theories of science and statistics; and history and the arts.
- The development of a proficiency in a modern language.
- Additional courses in the natural and social sciences and in literature to round out the core curriculum of a scholar's program.
- In-depth study in a major or majors selected from those offered by the university.
- Independent study, guided by a mentor professor, leading to a senior project.
- Study abroad at Oxford University and in a country where the scholar's choice of a foreign language can be used in daily living.
- Community mentorships appropriate to the scholar's major, in government, business, industry or education.

The core curriculum is designed to assist each Yeager Scholar in developing skills in analysis, synthesis and critical thinking. Each scholar will be expected to demonstrate superior skills in written and oral communication. In order to remain in the program, each student must maintain a cumulative 3.5 grade point average. Those who complete all academic requirements are awarded a Yeager medallion containing flecks of the same metal as the Bell X-1.

== See also ==
- John Marshall Scholars: another scholarship offered by Marshall University.
