= Marshall University – South Charleston Campus =

Coordinates: 38°21′26″N 81°41′52″W

Marshall University – South Charleston Campus is a branch campus of Marshall University located in South Charleston, West Virginia.

The institution traces its roots to extension graduate programs offered by both Marshall University and West Virginia University throughout West Virginia, and particularly in the metropolitan Charleston, West Virginia area prior to 1969.

In that year, the state reorganized its extension graduate system. WVU was limited to, except in a few subjects, offering extension programs in the northern part of the state, MU was limited to the four counties surrounding the main campus in Huntington, and a graduate only College of Graduate Studies (sometimes incorrectly called "The West Virginia College of Graduate Studies") was founded. The college had no campus of its own, and almost no faculty. It had some offices at West Virginia State College and offered classes on that campus and at locations throughout the rest of southern West Virginia, drawing its faculty from those of West Virginia State College, Concord College, Bluefield State College, Glenville State College and other institutions. The college also utilized adjunct faculty drawn from industry in the Kanawha Valley.

Because the original name lacked a geographic marker and institutional prestige, the school was briefly renamed The University of West Virginia College of Graduate Studies, and shortly thereafter, the West Virginia Graduate College. In 1992 the school got a campus of its own, moving to land donated by the Union Carbide Corporation near its research facility. The next year, the state again reorganized its graduate education system, merging the West Virginia Graduate College and the on-campus graduate programs of Marshall University under the name Marshall University Graduate College.

In 2010 the state authorized Marshall to begin offering extension undergraduate programs at the South Charleston location, and the facility was renamed the "Marshall University - South Charleston Campus", and commonly now known as "Marshall-South Charleston".

== See also ==
- Marshall University
