= Eric Vollmecke =

United States Air Force general

Major General Eric W. Vollmecke
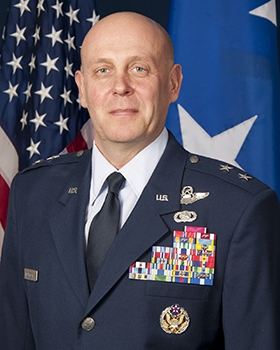
- Military career
- Allegiance: United States
- Branch: United States Air Force
- Service years: 1982 - 2017 (44 years)
- Rank: Major General
- Awards: See below

Major General Eric W. Vollmecke is a retired United States Air Force general. He was the Air National Guard Mobilization Assistant to the Commander, United States Air Forces in Europe/Air Forces Africa and was formerly the Assistant Adjutant General - Air in the West Virginia National Guard.

== Military career ==
Vollmecke entered the Air Force as a communications officer where he later served at Headquarters, United States Air Force Staff leading system development initiatives on the Worldwide Military Command and Control System. He has maintained his communications background through his civilian occupation.

In 1987, he joined the West Virginia Air National Guard and was selected to attend pilot training. Since then, he has risen from C-130 mission pilot through flight commander, squadron commander, director of operations and wing commander to his present position, while also balancing a corporate career. During his tenure as wing commander, he oversaw an enormous program to transform the base and transition its personnel from the tactical to the strategic airlift mission. Highlights of his career include a reserve officer exchange tour, during which he flew operational missions with the Royal Air Force in Africa. General Vollmecke has flown combat missions in Panama, Desert Shield/Storm, Bosnia, Kosovo, Operation Enduring Freedom and Operation Iraqi Freedom. After 11 September 2001, he led the 167th Airlift Wing on two deployments supporting combat operations for Operation Enduring Freedom. During initial stages of Operation Iraqi Freedom, he served as Chief of Staff for the Director of Mobility Forces for United States Central Command in the Combined Air Operations Center. In 2005, he was selected to command the 451st Air Expeditionary Group at Kandahar Airbase, Afghanistan.

In September 2017, he retired from the Air Force.

== Civilian occupation and professional affiliations ==
General Vollmecke serves as the Managing Director for North American Operations for a medical device manufacturer. He is responsible for building the company's partnerships and alliances for new joint ventures throughout the world. Additionally, he leads the company's global research and product development strategy working closely with the company's major manufacturing facilities in Germany and China.

Professional affiliations include membership in the National Guard Association of West Virginia, the National Guard Association of the United States and the Association of Information Technology Professionals.

== Personal life ==
General Vollmecke's younger brother, Kirk Vollmecke, is a Major General in the US Army.

== Education ==
1982 The Citadel, Bachelor of Arts, Mathematics, Charleston, South Carolina
1988 George Washington University, Master of Business Administration, Washington, D.C.
2000 Air War College, by correspondence
2010 George C. Marshall European Center for Security Studies, Senior Executive Seminar, Garmisch, Germany
2011 CAPSTONE General and Flag Officer Course, National Defense University, Fort Lesley J. McNair, Washington, D.C.

== Assignments ==
1. Nov 1982 – Apr 1983, Student, Computer Systems Development Training, Keesler Air Force Base, Mississippi
2. Apr 1983 – Apr 1984, Computer Systems Planning Officer, Air Force Data Services Center, The Pentagon, Washington, D.C.
3. Apr 1984 – Oct 1984, Computer Systems Planning Officer, 1st Information Systems Group, The Pentagon, Washington, D.C.
4. Oct 1984 – Apr 1985, Command and Control Programming Resources Officer, The Pentagon, Washington, D.C.
5. Apr 1985 – Aug 1987, Programs and Resources Officer, Headquarters, United States Air Force, The Pentagon, Washington, D.C.
6. Aug 1987 – Nov 1988, Student, Undergraduate Pilot Training, Reese Air Force Base, Texas
7. Nov 1988 – Nov 1992, Co-Pilot, C-130, 167th Tactical Airlift Squadron, Martinsburg, West Virginia
8. Nov 1992 – Nov 1993, Assistant Flight Commander, C-130, 167th Airlift Squadron, Martinsburg, West Virginia
9. Nov 1994 – Nov 1998, Pilot, C-130, 167th Airlift Squadron, Martinsburg, West Virginia
10. Nov 1998 – Oct 2002, Commander, 167th Airlift Squadron, Martinsburg, West Virginia
11. Oct 2002 – Jan 2004, Air Operations Staff Director, Headquarters, West Virginia Air National Guard, Charleston, West Virginia
12. Jan 2004 – Jan 2005, Commander, 167th Airlift Wing, Martinsburg, West Virginia
13. Oct 2007 – Oct 2011, Chief of Staff, Headquarters, West Virginia Air National Guard, Charleston, West Virginia
14. Aug 2009 – Jul 2012, (A5), Assistant to the Director, Air National Guard, Arlington, Virginia
15. Oct 2011 – Aug 2012, Assistant Adjutant General-Air, West Virginia National Guard, Charleston, West Virginia
16. Sep 2012 – Sep 2017, Air National Guard Assistant to the Commander, United States Air Forces in Europe/Air Forces Africa, Ramstein Air Force Base, Germany
17. Sep 2017 - Retired from USAF & WV ANG.

== Flight information ==
- Rating: Command Pilot
- Flight hours: 3,900 hours
- Aircraft flown: C-130B/E/H2/H3, C-5 Galaxy, T-37 Tweet, T-38 Talon
- Pilot wings from: Reese Air Force Base, Texas

== Awards and decorations ==
US Air Force Command Pilot Badge

Personal decorations
Legion of Merit
Bronze Star Medal
Meritorious Service Medal with two bronze oak leaf clusters
Air Medal with two bronze oak leaf clusters
Aerial Achievement Medal with bronze oak leaf cluster
Joint Service Commendation Medal
Air Force Commendation Medal with two bronze oak leaf clusters
Air Force Achievement Medal
Unit awards
Meritorious Unit Award
Air Force Outstanding Unit Award with Valor device and three bronze oak leaf clusters
Air Force Organizational Excellence Award
Service awards
Combat Readiness Medal with silver and two bronze oak leaf clusters
Campaign and service medals
National Defense Service Medal with bronze service star
Armed Forces Expeditionary Medal with two bronze service stars
Southwest Asia Service Medal (with one oak leaf cluster)
Kosovo Campaign Medal with bronze service star
Afghanistan Campaign Medal
Global War on Terrorism Expeditionary Medal
Global War on Terrorism Service Medal
Armed Forces Service Medal with bronze oak leaf cluster
Humanitarian Service Medal
Service, training, and marksmanship awards
Air Force Overseas Short Tour Service Ribbon with bronze oak leaf cluster
Air Force Expeditionary Service Ribbon with gold frame and two bronze oak leaf clusters
Air Force Longevity Service Award with four bronze oak leaf clusters
Armed Forces Reserve Medal with silver Hourglass device, Mobilization device and Award numeral 5
Small Arms Expert Marksman Ribbon
Air Force Training Ribbon
Foreign awards
NATO Medal
National Guard awards
West Virginia Commendation Medal
West Virginia Emergency Service Ribbon with two bronze oak leaf clusters
West Virginia Service Ribbon with two bronze oak leaf clusters
West Virginia Distinguished Unit Award with gold frame and bronze oak leaf cluster

== Effective dates of promotion ==
Promotions
Insignia	Rank	Date
	Major General	September 1, 2012
	Brigadier General	March 25, 2008
	Colonel	July 18, 2003
	Lieutenant Colonel	August 22, 1997
	Major	October 7, 1992
	Captain	August 22, 1986
	First Lieutenant	August 22, 1984
	Second Lieutenant	August 12, 1982
