= 130th Airlift Wing =

130th Airlift Wing

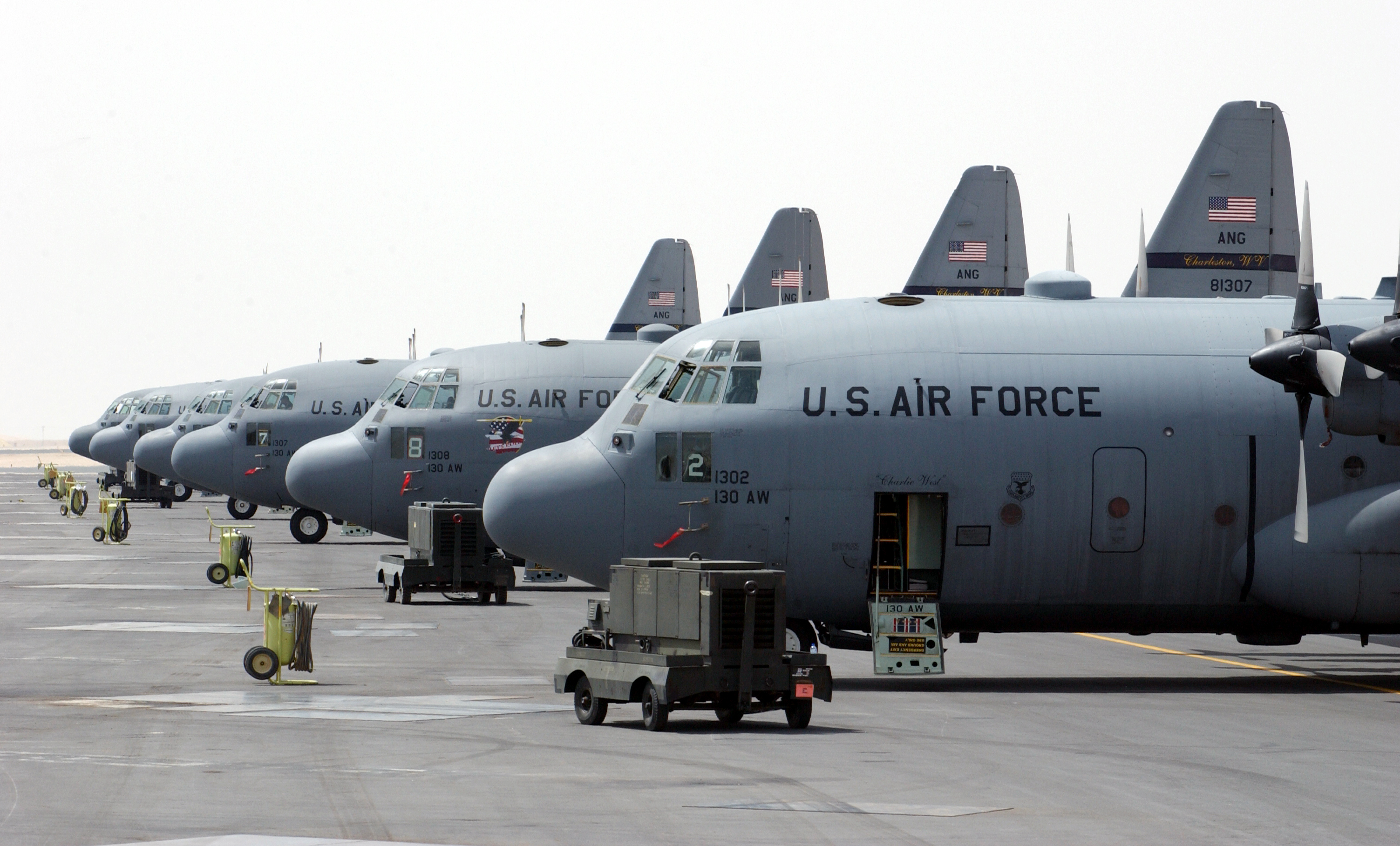
- 130th AW C-130s lined up on the tarmac while supporting Operation Iraqi Freedom
- Active: 1955–1958; 1962–present
- Country: United States
- Allegiance: West Virginia
- Branch: Air National Guard
- Type: Wing
- Role: Airlift
- Size: 8 C-130Js
- Part of: West Virginia Air National Guard
- Garrison/HQ: McLaughlin Air National Guard Base, Charleston, West Virginia
- Motto: Ready To Go!
- Decorations: Air Force Outstanding Unit Award
- Website: https://www.130aw.ang.af.mil

Commanders
- Current commander: Colonel Richard Switzer

Insignia
- 130th Airlift Wing emblem

- Tail stripe

The 130th Airlift Wing is a unit of the West Virginia Air National Guard, stationed at McLaughlin Air National Guard Base, Charleston, West Virginia. If activated to federal service, the Wing is gained by the United States Air Force Air Mobility Command.

== Mission ==
The 130th Airlift Wing is a unit of the West Virginia Air National Guard, based at Yeager Airport in Charleston, West Virginia, providing tactical airlift in support of the United States Air Force and the State of West Virginia. Its primary mission is to provide tactical airlift capabilities to support the West Virginia National Guard, United States, and its allies. This includes the transportation of personnel, equipment, and supplies in both domestic and international operations. The wing operates C-130J-30 Super Hercules aircraft, which are versatile and widely used for airlift missions. The C-130J-30 is capable of performing various roles, including troop and cargo transport, medical evacuation, and aerial refueling.

In addition to its military mission, the 130th Airlift Wing plays a crucial role in responding to domestic emergencies. The unit can be activated to provide humanitarian assistance, disaster relief, and support during state or national emergencies. Being part of the Air National Guard, the 130th Airlift Wing serves a dual role. In times of peace, it operates under the command of the governor of West Virginia to support state and local authorities. In times of war or national emergency, the unit can be federalized to support the broader defense needs of the United States.

== Units ==
The 130th Airlift Wing consists of the following units

- 130th Operations Group

130th Airlift Squadron

- 167th Aeromedical Evacuation Squadron
- 130th Maintenance Group
- 130th Mission Support Group
- 130th Medical Group

== History ==
On 1 July 1960, the West Virginia Air National Guard 130th Troop Carrier Squadron was authorized to expand to a group level, and the 130th Air Commando Group was established by the National Guard Bureau. The 130th being re-designated as an Air Commando squadron and becoming the group's flying squadron. Other squadrons assigned into the group were the 130th Headquarters, 130th Material Squadron (Maintenance), 130th Combat Support Squadron, and the 130th USAF Dispensary. Aircraft assigned to the new group were C-119 Flying Boxcars and U-10D Super Courier combat observation aircraft. The mission of the 130th ACG was primarily Air Commando special operations missions.

Continuing its mission and training with the Active duty 1st Air Commando Group in Northern Florida, in 1968 HQ USAF directed all Air Commando organizations be re-designated as "Special Operations" units to be more descriptive of their mission. Through the 1960s and into the 1970s the 130th participated in many international missions and received recognition for their performance. This included the 130th being awarded the Spaatz Trophy four times as the "Outstanding Flying Unit in the Country " and the Air Force Outstanding Unit Award five times.

In 1975, the Flying Boxcars were retired, the 130th receiving the far more capable C-130E Hercules transport, and being designated as a "Tactical Airlift" unit. The transition to the C-130 moved the gaining organization from Tactical Air Command to Military Airlift Command, with the primary mission of the Group becoming tactical airlift, with the Special Operations mission becoming secondary with the end of the Vietnam War.

A model upgrade to the C-130H in 1986 was completed and in August and September 1990, the 130th TAG commanded a "volunteer" package of 16 C-130s and support personnel from WV, TN, TX, MO and DE ANG units in support of Operation Desert Shield. October 1990 saw the Presidential Call of selected members from the 130th Tactical Airlift Squadron combining with the 181st Tactical Airlift Squadron, TX ANG to form the functional staff of the 1630th Tactical Airlift Squadron (Provisional) at Al Ain International Airport, Al Ain, United Arab Emirates. In December 1990, the 130th Tactical Clinic and the 130th Mobile Aerial Port Squadron had selective members activated. They deployed to RAF Bicester, UK and Dover AFB, Delaware respectively, subsequent to "Operation Desert Storm". All members were deactivated by June 1991. The members of the group located in the United Arab Emirates received the Air Force Outstanding Unit Award with valor.

In April 1992, some unit members and aircraft deployed to Rhein-Main AB, Germany in support of the Bosnian Airlift called "Operation Provide Promise". The 130th has deployed several times since this date for "Provide Promise", the latest being from 21 September 1998 to 29 October 1998. In August 1993, one aircraft and 2 crews were sent to Operation "Operation Support Hope" for 30 days in Rwanda, Africa.

Organizationally, the 130th was expanded to a Wing status in 1995. From January to March 1996, the unit deployed 2 aircraft, 6 crews and maintenance support to Daharan, Saudi Arabia, in support of Operation Southern Watch.

As of mid-2000, the 130th AW had recently sent several aircraft and support personnel to Panama for Coronet Oak. While there, wing personnel were heavily involved in Hurricane Mitch relief to Honduras and Nicaragua.

A significant milestone occurred on August 8, 2021, as the wing initiated a transition from the C-130H to the C-130J Super Hercules, marking a new era with the arrival of the first of eight C-130J-30 aircraft. Noteworthy in this transition is the elimination of the traditional navigator and flight engineer crew positions. The C-130J-30 is considered superior due to advanced avionics, increased performance, fuel efficiency, reduced maintenance requirements, upgraded payload and cargo handling capabilities, a digital flight control system, multi-role capabilities, and an enhanced airframe life. This strategic move reflects the 130th Airlift Wing's commitment to modernizing its capabilities for future missions while optimizing crew configurations for streamlined operations.

=== BRAC 2005 ===
On 13 May 2005, the United States Department of Defense released its Base Realignment and Closure, 2005 (BRAC) report, and the 130th Airlift Wing was one of the units slated to be eventually decommissioned. Its complement of eight C-130H aircraft would be transferred to Pope Air Force Base, and its complement of expeditionary combat support (ECS) personnel to the 167th Airlift Wing.

Upon learning of this, several former commanders of the 130th Airlift Wing along with members of the local Kanawha County Commission and the Yeager Airport Board of Directors and formed the Keep 'Em Flying grassroots organization to try to prevent the unit from being decommissioned. Following an outpouring of community support, money was raised for newspaper and radio ads and to hire analysts familiar with BRAC, all in an attempt to save the unit. Funds were contributed from Yeager Airport, the Kanawha County Commission and the local economic development organization, the Charleston Area Alliance. On 13 June 2005, members of the BRAC commission came to Charleston to evaluate the base and talk to General Tackett, Governor Joe Manchin, Senator Robert Byrd, Congresswoman Shelley Moore Capito and Col Bill Peters Jr, former commander of the 130th and chair for Keep 'Em Flying.

Following this visit, and taking in all the information that was presented to them during that time, the BRAC commission voted unanimously, 9–0, to keep the unit intact.

=== Notable achievements ===
- Being the first Air Guard unit to deploy outside the United States, February 1965.
- First Air Guard unit to participate in "Operation Bright Star" near Cairo, Egypt in 1981.
- Only Air Guard unit to participate in the 40th anniversary of D-Day, held in France in 1984.
- First unit to combine with the active force for an ORI inspection in 1987.
- Aug 1990 – Headed volunteer package 1630th TAS(P) during Desert Shield. Based at Al Ain Air Base, UAE the 1630 flew missions to every country in the Southwest Asia AOR.
- Oct 1990 – Members of the 130th Tactical Airlift Squadron and 130th Maintenance Squadron were activated by Presidential Order and joined other members of the 1630th TAS(P) already in place for Desert Shield.
- Nov 1990 – The 130th Tactical Clinic was activated by Presidential Order and sent to England to head up a hospital for war casualties.
- Dec 1990 – 130th Mobile Aerial Port activated by Presidential Order and sent to Dover AFB, DE in support of Desert Shield and Desert Storm.
- Jan 1991 – Desert Storm – Several members of the 1630th Tactical Airlift Squadron (Provisional) and aircraft deployed to King Fahd AB, KSA, in support of the air portion of Operation Desert Storm. The unit moved more cargo and troops (weight) in 12 days than in the entire Berlin Airlift.
- April 1991 – Unit returned home
- April 1992 – Some unit members and aircraft deployed to Rhein-Main Air Base, Germany in support of the Bosnian Airlift, Operation "Provide Promise". The 130th has deployed several times since this date for "Provide Promise", the latest being 21 Sept 98 to 29 Oct 98.
- Aug 1993 – One aircraft and 2 crews were sent to Operation Support Hope for 30 days in Rwanda, Africa.
- Jan–Mar 1996 – Unit deployed 2 aircraft, 6 crews and maintenance support to D'haran, KSA in support of Operation Southern Watch.
- Apr–Jun 1998 – Support of Operation Southern Watch from Prince Sultan Air Base, KSA.

== Lineage ==
Established as the 130th Air Resupply Group and allotted to the Air National Guard
Activated and extended federal recognition on 15 October 1955
Inactivated in October 1958
Redesignated 130th Troop Carrier Group
Activated on 16 January 1962
Redesignated 130th Air Commando Group on 24 July 1963
Redesignated 130th Special Operations Group on 19 August 1968
Redesignated 130th Tactical Airlift Group on 4 October 1975
Redesignated 130th Airlift Group on 16 March 1992
Redesignated 130th Airlift Wing on 1 October 1995

=== Assignments ===
- West Virginia Air National Guard, 1 July 1960

Gained by: Tactical Air Command
Gained by: Military Airlift Command, 1 July 1975
Gained by: Air Mobility Command, 1 June 1992
Gained by: Air Combat Command, 1 October 1993
Gained by: Air Mobility Command, 1 October 1997 – Present

=== Components ===
- 130th Operations Group, 1 October 1995 – present
- 130th Air Resupply Squadron (later 130th Troop Carrier Squadron, 130th Air Commando Squadron, 130th Special Operations Squadron, 130th Tactical Airlift Squadron, 130th Airlift Squadron, 15 October 1955– October 1958, 16 January 19621 July 1960 – 1 October 1995

== Stations ==
Yeager Airport Charleston, West Virginia, 1 October 1955

Designated: McLaughlin Air National Guard Base, 1991–Present

=== Aircraft ===
- C-119 Flying Boxcar, 1960–1975
- U-10D Super Courier, 1960–1975
- C-130E Hercules, 1975–1986
- C-130H Hercules, 1986-2021
- C-130J Super Hercules, 2021–Present

=== Decorations ===
- Air Force Outstanding Unit Award
