= 130th Airlift Squadron =

130th Airlift Squadron

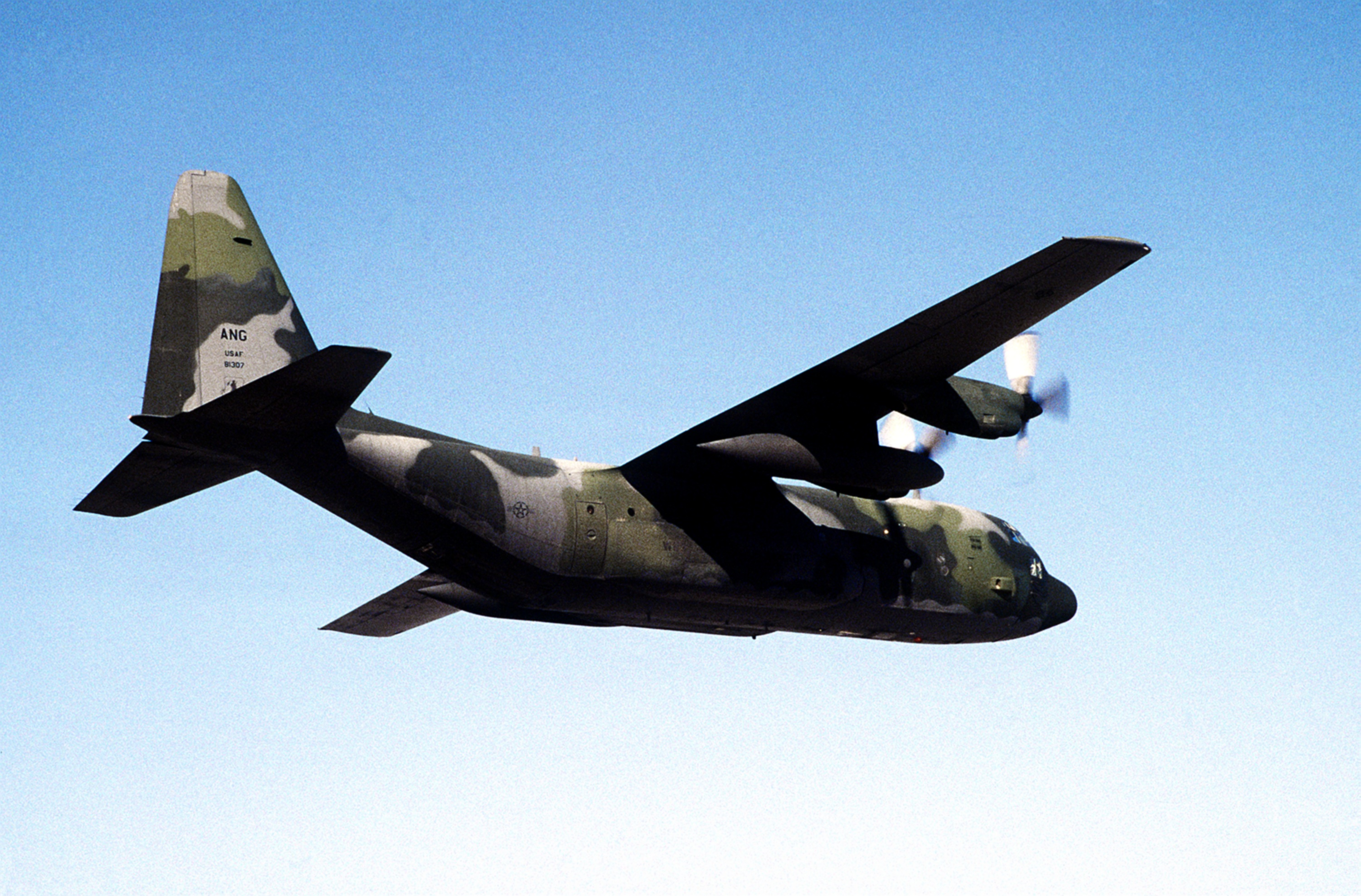
- 130th Airlift Squadron C-130H Hercules over the United Arab Emirates during Operation Desert Storm
- Active: 1955–present
- Country: United States
- Allegiance: West Virginia
- Branch: Air National Guard
- Type: Squadron
- Role: Airlift
- Part of: West Virginia Air National Guard
- Garrison/HQ: Charleston Air National Guard Base, West Virginia
- Patron: "Mountaineers in Green"
- Decorations: Air Force Outstanding Unit Award

Insignia
- 130th Airlift Squadron emblem

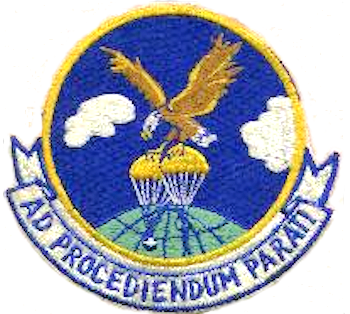
- 130th Air Commando Squadron emblem

- Tail stripe

The 130th Airlift Squadron is a unit of the West Virginia Air National Guard 130th Airlift Wing located at Charleston Air National Guard Base, Charleston, West Virginia. 130th is equipped with the C-130J Super Hercules.

== History ==
The West Virginia Air National Guard was authorized to expand to two squadrons in 1955 by the National Guard Bureau. On 1 October, the 130th Air Resupply Squadron was organized at Kanawha Airport, Charleston and was extended federal recognition. It was equipped with Grumman HU-16 Albatross amphibians and C-46 Commando troop transports. The mission of the squadron was primarily special operations missions.

1n 1962, the 130th was authorized to expand to a group level, and the 130th Air Commando Group was established. The 130th became the group's flying squadron. Other elements assigned into the group were the group headquarters, 130th Material Squadron (maintenance and supply), 130th Combat Support Squadron, and the 130th USAF Dispensary. Aircraft assigned to the new group were upgraded to C-119 Flying Boxcars and U-10D Super Courier combat observation aircraft.

Continuing its mission and training with the active duty 1st Air Commando Group in northern Florida, in 1968 HQ USAF directed all air commando organizations be redesignated as special operationsunits to be more descriptive of their mission. Through the 1960s and into the 1970s the 130th participated in many international missions and received recognition for its performance. This included the 130th being awarded the Spaatz Trophy four times as the "Outstanding Flying Unit in the Country " and the Air Force Outstanding Unit Award five times.

In 1975 the Flying Boxcars were retired, the 130th received the far more capable C-130E Hercules transport, and the unit was redesignated as a "Tactical Airlift" unit. The transition to the C-130 moved the gaining organization from Tactical Air Command to Military Airlift Command with the primary mission of the Group becoming tactical airlift, with the Special Operations mission becoming secondary with the end of the Vietnam War.

A model upgrade to the C-130H in 1986 was completed and in August and September 1990, the 130th TAG commanded a "volunteer" package of 16 C-130s and support personnel from WV, TN, TX, MO and DE ANG units in support of Operation Desert Shield. October 1990 saw the Presidential Call of selected members from the 130th Tactical Airlift Squadron combining with the 181st Tactical Airlift Squadron, TX ANG to form the functional staff of the 1630th Tactical Airlift Squadron (Provisional) at Al Ain International Airport, Al Ain, United Arab Emirates. In December 1990, the 130th Tactical Clinic and the 130th Mobile Aerial Port Squadron had selective members activated. They deployed to RAF Bicester, UK and Dover Air Force Base, Delaware respectively, subsequent to Operation Desert Storm. All members were released from active duty by June 1991. The members of the group located in the United Arab Emirates received the Air Force Outstanding Unit Award with valor.

In April 1992, some unit members and aircraft deployed to Rhein-Main Air Base, Germany in support of the Bosnian airlift called Operation Provide Promise. The 130th has deployed several times since this date for Provide Promise, the latest being from 21 September 1998 to 29 October 1998. In August 1993, one aircraft and 2 crews were sent to Operation Operation Support Hope for 30 days in Rwanda, Africa.

Organizationally, the 130th Group was expanded to a wing in 1995. From January to March 1996, the unit deployed two aircraft, six crews and maintenance support to Daharan, Saudi Arabia, in support of Operation Southern Watch.

As of mid-2000, the 130th AW sent several aircraft and support personnel to Panama for Coronet Oak. While there, wing personnel were heavily involved in Hurricane Mitch relief to Honduras and Nicaragua.

== Lineage ==
- Constituted as the 130th Air Resupply Squadron and allotted to the Air National Guard in 1955

Activated and extended federal recognition on 16 October 1955
Redesignated 130th Troop Carrier Squadron, Medium c. 31 October 1958
Redesignated 130th Air Commando Squadron c. 24 July 1963
Redesignated 130th Special Operations Squadron c. 18 August 1968
Redesignated 130th Tactical Airlift Squadron on 4 October 1975
Redesignated 130th Airlift Squadron on 16 March 1992

=== Assignments ===
- 130th Air Resupply Group, 1 October 1955
- West Virginia Air National Guard, c. 31 October 1958
- 130th Troop Carrier Group (later 130th Air Commando Group, 130th Tactical Airlift Group, 130th Airlift Group), 1 January 1962
- 130th Operations Group, 1 October 1995 – present

=== Stations ===
- Kanawha County Airport (Later Yeager Airport, Charleston Air National Guard Base), West Virginia, 1 October 1955 – present

=== Aircraft ===
- HU-16 Albatross, 1955-1960
- C-46 Commando, 1955-1960
- C-119 Flying Boxcar, 1960-1975
- U-10D Super Courier, 1960-1975
- C-130E Hercules, 1975-1986
- C-130H Hercules, 1986–2021
- C-130J Super Hercules, 2021-Present
