= 167th Airlift Squadron =

167th Airlift Squadron

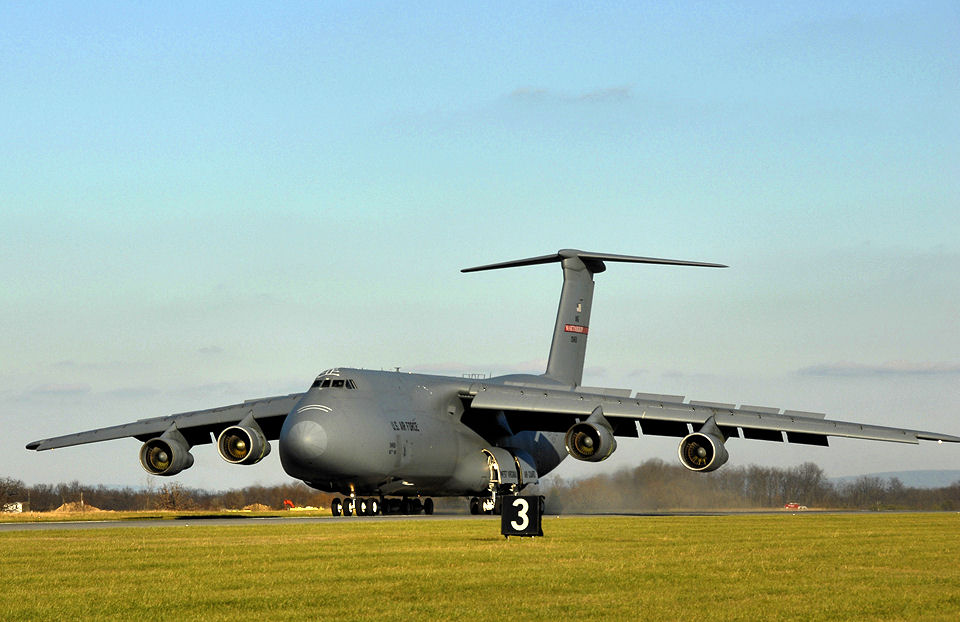
- 167th Airlift Squadron Lockheed C-5A Galaxy 70-0452 landing at Shepherd Field, Martinsburg
- Active: 1943–1945; 1947–1952; 1952–1972; 1972–present
- Country: United States
- Branch: Air National Guard
- Type: Squadron
- Role: Airlift
- Part of: West Virginia Air National Guard
- Garrison/HQ: Shepherd Field Air National Guard Base, West Virginia
- Engagements: European Theater of Operations
- Decorations: Distinguished Unit Citation

Insignia
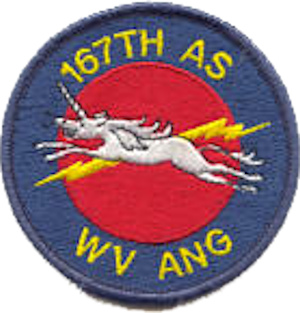
- 167th Airlift Squadron emblem

- Tail stripe

The 167th Airlift Squadron is a unit of the West Virginia Air National Guard 167th Airlift Wing located at Shepherd Field Air National Guard Base, Martinsburg, West Virginia. It is equipped with the C-17 Globemaster III, heavy airlifter.

== History ==
=== World War II ===
Organized and trained in New England during 1943. Moved to England in January 1944, being assigned to VIII Fighter Command. Entered combat in Spring 1944, supported the invasion of Normandy during June 1944 by patrolling the English Channel, escorting bombardment formations to the French coast, and dive-bombing and strafing bridges, locomotives, and rail lines near the battle area. After D-Day, engaged chiefly in escorting bombers to oil refineries, marshalling yards, and other targets in such cities as Ludwigshafen, Stuttgart, Frankfurt, Berlin, Merseburg, and Brux. Continued combat operations until the German capitulation in May 1945. Returned to the United States and was inactivated in November 1945.

=== West Virginia Air National Guard ===
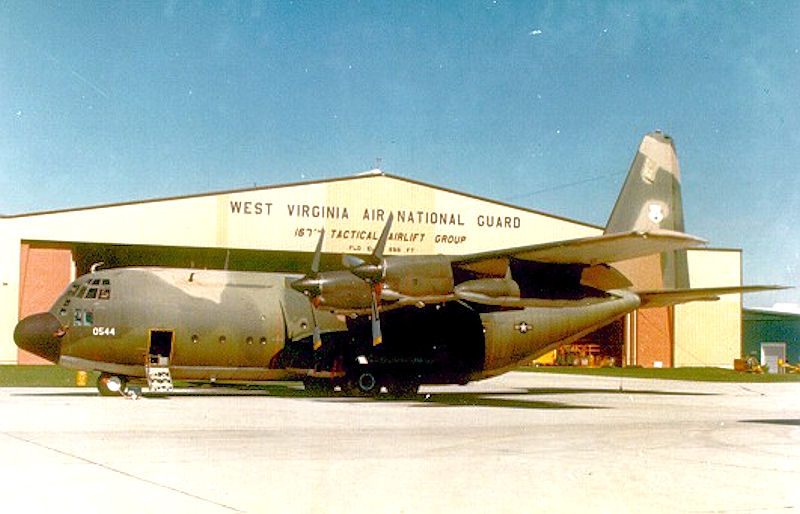
167th TAS Lockheed C-130A 56-544

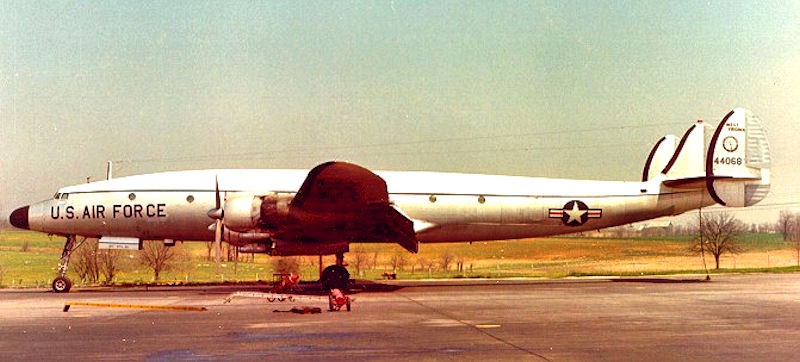
67th ATS Lockheed C-121G 54-4068

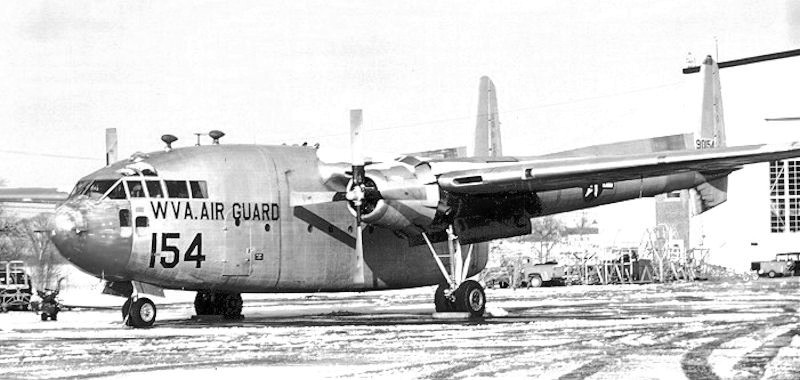
167th ATS Fairchild C-119C Flying Boxcar 49-154

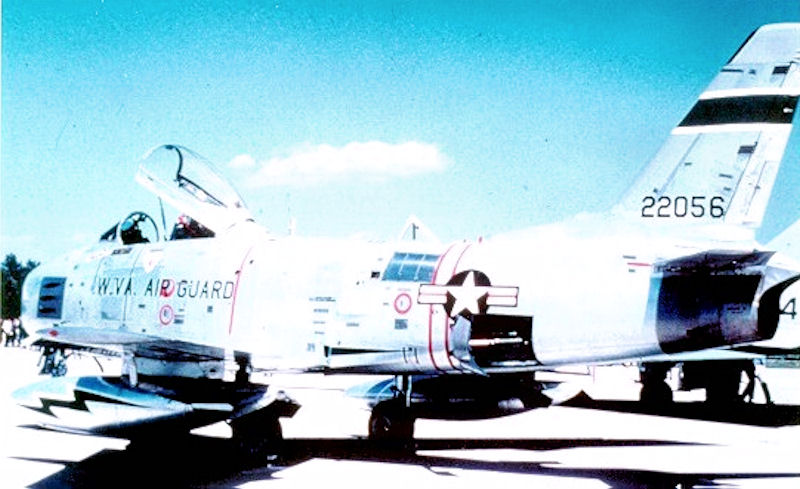
167th FS F-86H Sabre 52-2056

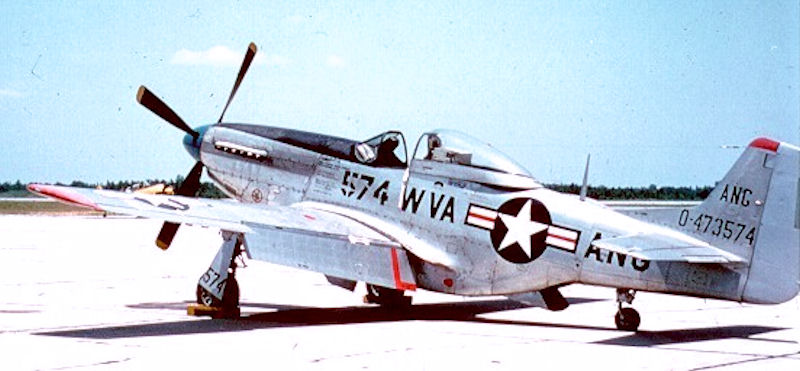
167th FS F-51D Mustang 44-73574

The National Guard designated the State of West Virginia as the resident state for the fighter squadron. On 24 May 1946, Charleston's Kanawha County Airport became the home base for the renamed 167th Fighter Squadron. The unit reactivated on 5 January 1947 and was federally recognized effective 7 March 1947. The assigned strength: 19 officers and 35 airmen. Within six months, the unit attained full manning strength. Early aircraft included the T-6 Trainer, the F-47 Thunderbolt and the F-51 Mustang. The name, mission, size and even the site changed over the next 60 years, but the numbers "167" have remained constant with the West Virginia Air National Guard.

On 10 October 1950, the unit and all personnel were sworn in for 21 months of active duty during the Korean War. Most personnel and all aircraft became part of the 123d Fighter-Bomber Wing, located at Godman Air Force Base, Kentucky. Some members transferred to RAF Manston near London, England, flying F-84 Thunderjet aircraft. Other seasoned (experienced) pilots transferred to Far East Air Forces for combat duty in the Korean War.

Released from active duty on 9 July 1952, the 167th Fighter-Interceptor Squadron returned to Charleston, West Virginia and the F-51 Mustang aircraft. The unit name changed to the 167th Fighter-Bomber Squadron on 1 December 1952.

Because of limitations at Kanawha Airport at that time, that could not accommodate jet aircraft, a search for a new home in West Virginia began. Two sites considered were Beckley and Martinsburg. The cost of improvements at Beckley came to $5,978,000 and for Martinsburg $3,093,000. Though Beckley campaigned hard, Martinsburg received approval as the new site on 21 September 1955. Martinsburg had to raise funds to purchase the 200 acres needed to expand the runway. Two hundred citizens signed notes, totaling over $160,000, to guarantee sufficient money for buying the land until a bond issue could be voted on by the citizens. The official move came on 3 December 1955, when the 167th left Charleston and opened on 4 December 1955 at Martinsburg. Shortly thereafter, equipment moved to the new site and active recruiting commenced to achieve full authorized personnel strength.

New construction and the increase of manpower continued in 1956. The aircraft assigned included the F-51 Mustang, T-6 Trainer, and a C-47 Skytrain. The immediate need became to recruit 70 airmen and 10 officers. By 1956, manning grew to a strength of 399 airmen and 44 officers. The 167th Squadron dedicated its new facilities on 4 October 1958. On 10 November 1958, the unit became the 167th Tactical Fighter Squadron.

In 1956 and 1957, the unit flew F-51 Mustangs and T-28's. The 167th was the last Air National Guard squadron flying the F-51 Mustang. Following a two-year construction phase the unit received single engine jet fighter/interceptors, the F-86 Sabre.

In an announcement on 31 January 1961, the 167th learned it would gain change aircraft. On 1 April, the unit received Fairchild C-119 Flying Boxcars. A new mission and name change also took effect: The 167th Aeromedical Transport Squadron, Light. The mission became evacuation and care of the sick and wounded. The changes resulted in an increase of manpower and the addition of nurses to the unit. The authorized strength had grown to 572 total airmen and officers.

Aircraft changes in 1963 saw the arrival of the C-121 Super Constellation with its worldwide operating capability. Staffing increased to 604 enlisted and 107 officers. Overseas missions flown to Puerto Rico, the Azores, France, England, West Germany, Spain and Bermuda were not uncommon. The unit began flying missions to the Pacific areas in 1965 and 1966. During 1966, the Super Constellations made 103 overseas flights, including 26 to South Vietnam and 77 to other outpost such as Thailand, Australia, Japan and the Philippines, carrying 1198 tons of military cargo and 1390 passengers.

The unit anticipated that it would be inactivated 1 July 1967, since no projected program had been specified beyond that date. A new campaign began to find new aircraft, a new mission or to justify continuance of the old mission. Senator Robert C. Byrd became active in securing a new mission. An announcement in December stated that the unit would be assigned an aeromedical aircraft mission, thus keeping the unit alive. Nurses became a particularly critical specialty during this period. New construction included an engine build-up shop, squadron operations building, maintenance dock, civil engineering and aerospace ground equipment buildings.

In 1972, the unit began the transition into the Lockheed C-130 Hercules and, as a result, another new mission. In June of that year, the unit became the 167th Tactical Airlift Squadron and its mobilization gaining command moved from the Military Airlift Command to the Tactical Airlift Command. Late in 1977, the unit received "B" model C-130s. The 1986, the number of aircraft assigned increased, and in 1989, the "B" model was replaced with the "E" model.

1 June 1992, saw the unit's name change again. This time, the 167th became the 167th Airlift Squadron. Reorganization placed the unit in the Air Mobility Command. Other activities involving the unit were hosting of the Apple Harvest Festival in October, a Volant Oak rotation in October and November and the involvement of aircraft and crews with Operation Provide Promise. Provide Promise support took place from July 1992 to January 1993.

In 1995, the unit began conversion training for the C-130H-3 in the first quarter and transferred most of the "E" models to the Illinois Air National Guard 182d Airlift Wing, Peoria, Illinois. The unit celebrated its 40th anniversary on 10 June 1995 with an open house and dance.

The 167th Airlift Group was redesignated the 167th Airlift Wing on 1 October 1995. The 167th Airlift Squadron was reassigned to the new 167th Operations Group under the objective wing structure of the new Wing.

Since the 11 September 2001, terrorist attacks on New York City and Washington, D.C., the unit has had members deployed to the four corners of the world in support of Operations Enduring Freedom and Iraqi Freedom. Unit members have received six Bronze Stars and two Purple Hearts in support of these operations.

In March 2002, Senator Robert Byrd announced that the unit would transition to the C-5 Galaxy aircraft. On 4 December 2006 the first C-5 aircraft assigned to the unit landed at Shepherd Field. Ten more aircraft were assigned to the squadron.

On 28 March 2007 the unit launched its first C-5 mission from Shepherd Air Field. After a brief stop at Dover Air Force Base, the aircraft continued on to Camp Lemonier, Djibouti, Africa, delivering two CH-53E Super Stallion helicopters (used for humanitarian assistance, personnel and equipment movement, and noncombatant casualty evacuations) and more than 60 marines supporting Combined Joint Task Force – Horn of Africa.

Recently, the 167th Airlift Wing was tasked to provide transportation for NASA's Ares I-X Crew Module, Launch Abort System Simulator, and related equipment. On 27 January 2009 the unit launched a C-5 aircraft to the Shuttle Landing Facility located at Langley Air Force Base, Virginia. The crew loaded a 70-foot trailer carrying the Launch Abort System and a 50-foot trailer carrying the Crew Module. The cargo was delivered to the Kennedy Space Center in Florida the following day.

Since 2003, approximately $280,000,000 has been utilized in the C-5 facility conversion program. These projects include site prep, an air control tower, a flight simulator facility, ramp and hydrant upgrades, a corrosion control hangar, a fuel cell hangar, runway upgrades and extensions, a fire station, a supply warehouse, apron and jet fuel storage, taxiway upgrades, and a new squadron operations facility is in progress.

=== Lineage ===
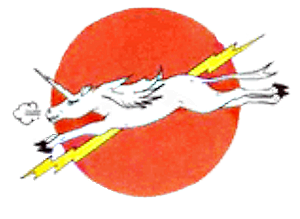
Legacy World War II emblem of the 369th Fighter Squadron

167th Aeromedical Airlift Squadron

- Constituted as the 369th Fighter Squadron on 20 December 1942

Activated on 15 January 1943
Inactivated on 10 November 1945

- Redesignated 167th Fighter Squadron, and allotted to the National Guard on 24 May 1946.

Received federal recognition on 7 March 1947
Federalized and placed on active duty on 10 October 1950
Redesignated 167th Fighter-Bomber Squadron on 10 October 1950
Inactivated, released from active duty and returned to West Virginia state control on 10 July 1952
Redesignated 167th Tactical Fighter Squadron on 10 November 1958
Redesignated 167th Aeromedical Transport Squadron, Light on 1 April 1961
Redesignated 167th Air Transport Squadron on 18 January 1964
Redesignated 167th Military Airlift Squadron on 1 January 1966
Redesignated 167th Aeromedical Airlift Squadron on 1 August 1967
Inactivated on 2 June 1972
Consolidated with the 167th Tactical Airlift Squadron on 18 August 1987

167th Airlift Squadron
Constituted as the 167th Tactical Airlift Squadron on 1 May 1972

Activated on 3 June 1972

Consolidated with the 167th Aeromedical Airlift Squadron on 18 August 1987
Redesignated 167th Airlift Squadron on 1 June 1992

=== Assignments ===
- 359th Fighter Group, 15 Jan 1943 – 10 Nov 1945
- 55th Fighter Wing, 7 March 1957
- 123d Fighter-Bomber Wing, 10 Oct 1950 – 10 July 1952
- 121st Fighter-Bomber Group (late 121st Fighter-Interceptor Group, 121st Fighter-Bomber Group), 10 July 1952
- 106th Aeromedical Transport Group, 1 April 1961 – 2 June 1972
- 167th Air Transport Group (later 167th Military Airlift Group, 167th Aeromedical Airlift Group), 3 June 1972
- 167th Tactical Airlift Group (later 167th Airlift Group), 3 June 1972
- 167th Operations Group, 1 October 1995 – present

=== Stations ===
- Westover Field, Massachusetts, 15 January 1943
- Grenier Field, New Hampshire, 6 April 1943
- Republic Field, Long Island, New York, 26 May 1943
- Westover Field, Massachusetts, 24 August – 2 October 1943
- RAF East Wretham (AAF-133), England, c. 18 Oct 1943 – c. 4 November 1945
- Camp Kilmer, New Jersey, 9–10 Nov 1945
- Kanawha County Airport, West Virginia, 7 March 1947
- Godman Air Force Base, Kentucky, 20 October 1950
- RAF Manston, England, November 1951 – 10 July 1952
- Kanawha County Airport, West Virginia, 10 July 1952
- Shepherd Field (later Eastern West Virginia Regional Airport, West Virginia, 4 December 1955 – 2 June 1972
- Eastern West Virginia Regional Airport (later Shepherd Field Air National Guard Base), West Virginia, 3 June 1972 – present

=== Aircraft ===
- P-47 Thunderbolt, 1943–1944
- P-51 (later F-52) Mustang, 1944–1945, 1947–1950, 1952–1957
- F-84 Thunderjet, 1950–1952
- F-86 Sabre, 1957–1961
- C-119 Flying Boxcar, 1961–1963
- C-121 Super Constellation, 1963–1971
- C-130 Hercules, 1971–2006
- C-5 Galaxy, 2006– 2014
- C-17 Globemaster III, 2015–Present
