= West Virginia Wing Civil Air Patrol =

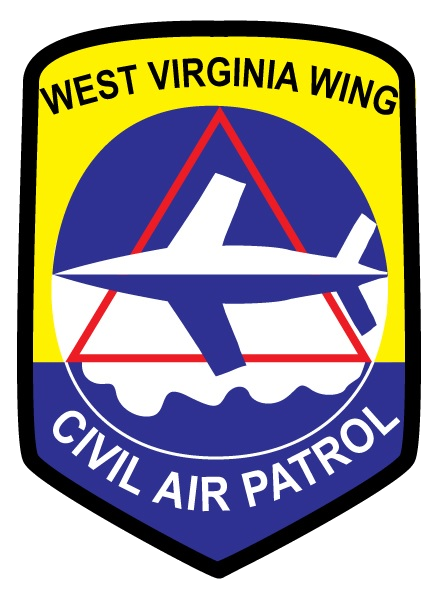
- West Virginia Wing of Civil Air Patrol

Associated branches
- United States Air Force

Command staff
- Commander: Col Debbie Butler-Case
- Deputy Commander: Maj Jason A. Hudak
- Chief of Staff: Maj David (Logan) Wheatcraft

Current statistics
- Cadets: 258
- Seniors: 362
- Total Membership: 620
- Website: wvwg.cap.gov
- Statistics as of March 18, 2025

Civil Air Patrol squadrons in West Virginia

The West Virginia Wing of the Civil Air Patrol (CAP) is the highest echelon of Civil Air Patrol in the state of West Virginia. West Virginia Wing headquarters are located in Charleston, West Virginia. The West Virginia Wing consists of over 600 cadet and adult members at 14 locations across the state of West Virginia.

== Mission ==
The Civil Air Patrol has three primary missions: providing emergency services; offering cadet programs for youth; and providing aerospace education for CAP members and the general public.

=== Emergency services ===
The Civil Air Patrol performs emergency services missions, including search and rescue missions directed by the Air Force Rescue Coordination Center at Tyndall Air Force Base in Florida. Other missions include providing disaster relief, through offering ground and air transport of and an extensive communications network, and the transport of medically time-sensitive materials. The Civil Air Patrol provides Air Force support through the conducting of light transport, communications support, and low-altitude route surveys. The Civil Air Patrol may also assist in counter-drug missions.

=== Cadet programs ===
The Civil Air Patrol runs a cadet program for youth aged 12 to 21. The program allows cadets to progress at their own pace through a 16-step program including aerospace education, leadership training, physical fitness and moral leadership.

=== Aerospace education ===
The Civil Air Patrol teaches aerospace education to both CAP members and the general public. Teaching includes the providing of training to the members of the CAP, and offering workshops for youth throughout the nation through schools and public aviation events.

== Organization ==
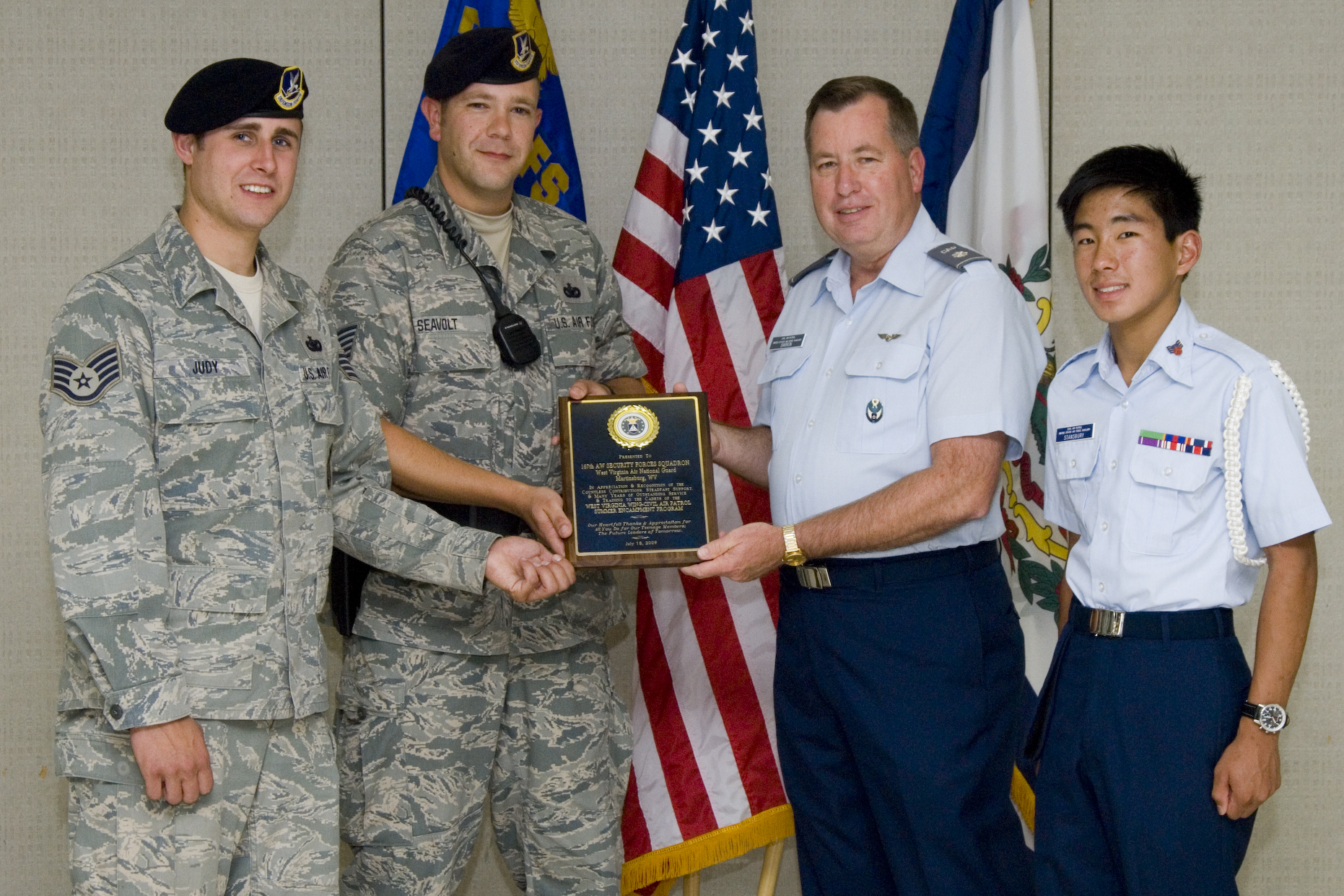
Civil Air Patrol Lt Col Dennis Barron and Cadet Senior Airman Ty Stansbury present SSgt Patrick Judy and TSgt Michael Seavolt, 167th Security Forces Squadron, a plaque of appreciation at the 167th Airlift Wing.

Squadrons of the West Virginia Wing
Designation	Squadron Name	Location	Notes
WV-000	West Virginia Wing HQ Squadron	Charleston	
WV-099	Beckley Composite Squadron	Beaver	
WV-030	Boone Composite Squadron	Danville	
WV-016	Calhoun Composite Squadron	Grantsville	
WV-013	Charleston Composite Squadron	Charleston	
WV-038	Clarksburg Composite Squadron	Bridgeport	
WV-033	Elkins Composite Squadron	Elkins	
WV-100	Greenbrier Composite Squadron	Lewisburg	
WV-020	Martinsburg Composite Squadron	Martinsburg	
WV-093	Mercer Composite Squadron	Bluefield	
WV-113	Mid-Valley Composite Squadron	Ona	
WV-060	Morgantown Composite Squadron	Morgantown	
WV-040	Parkersburg Composite Squadron	Parkersburg	
WV-114	Potomac Highlands Composite Squadron	Petersburg	
WV-049	Wheeling Composite Squadron	Wheeling	

== See also ==
- Awards and decorations of the Civil Air Patrol
- West Virginia Air National Guard
