= Eastern WV Regional Airport =

Eastern WV Regional Airport Shepherd Field
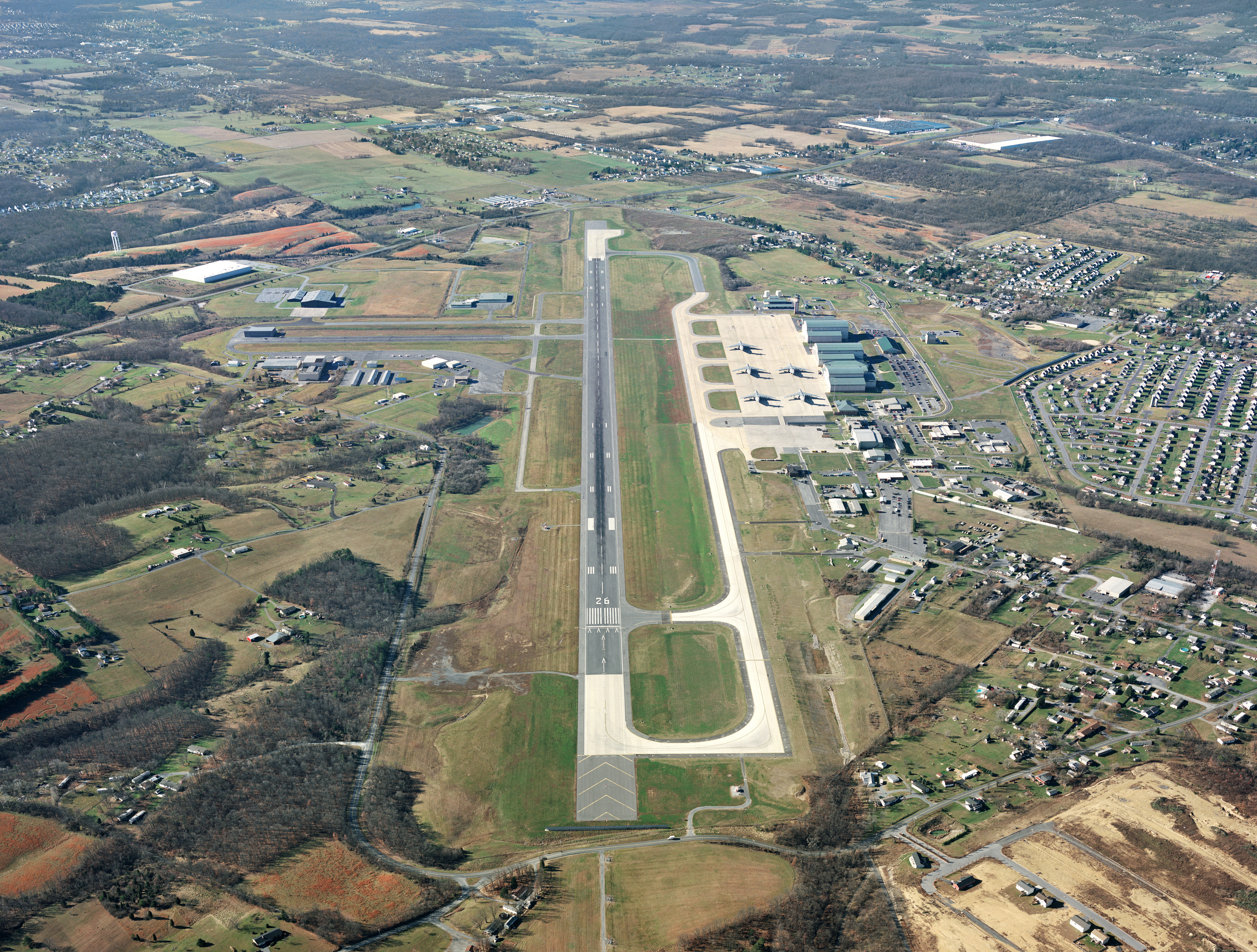
- IATA: MRB; ICAO: KMRB; FAA LID: MRB

Summary
- Airport type: Public
- Owner: Eastern WV Regional Airport Authority
- Serves: Martinsburg, West Virginia
- Elevation AMSL: 565 ft (172 m)
- Coordinates: 39°24′07″N 077°59′05″W
- Website: FlyMRB.com

Map
- Location of airport in West Virginia / United States MRB (the United States)

Runways
Direction	Length		Surface
Direction	ft	m	Surface
08/26	8,815	2,687	Asphalt

Statistics (12/01/2020-11/30/2021)
- Aircraft operations: 46,108
- Based aircraft: 102
- Source: Federal Aviation Administration

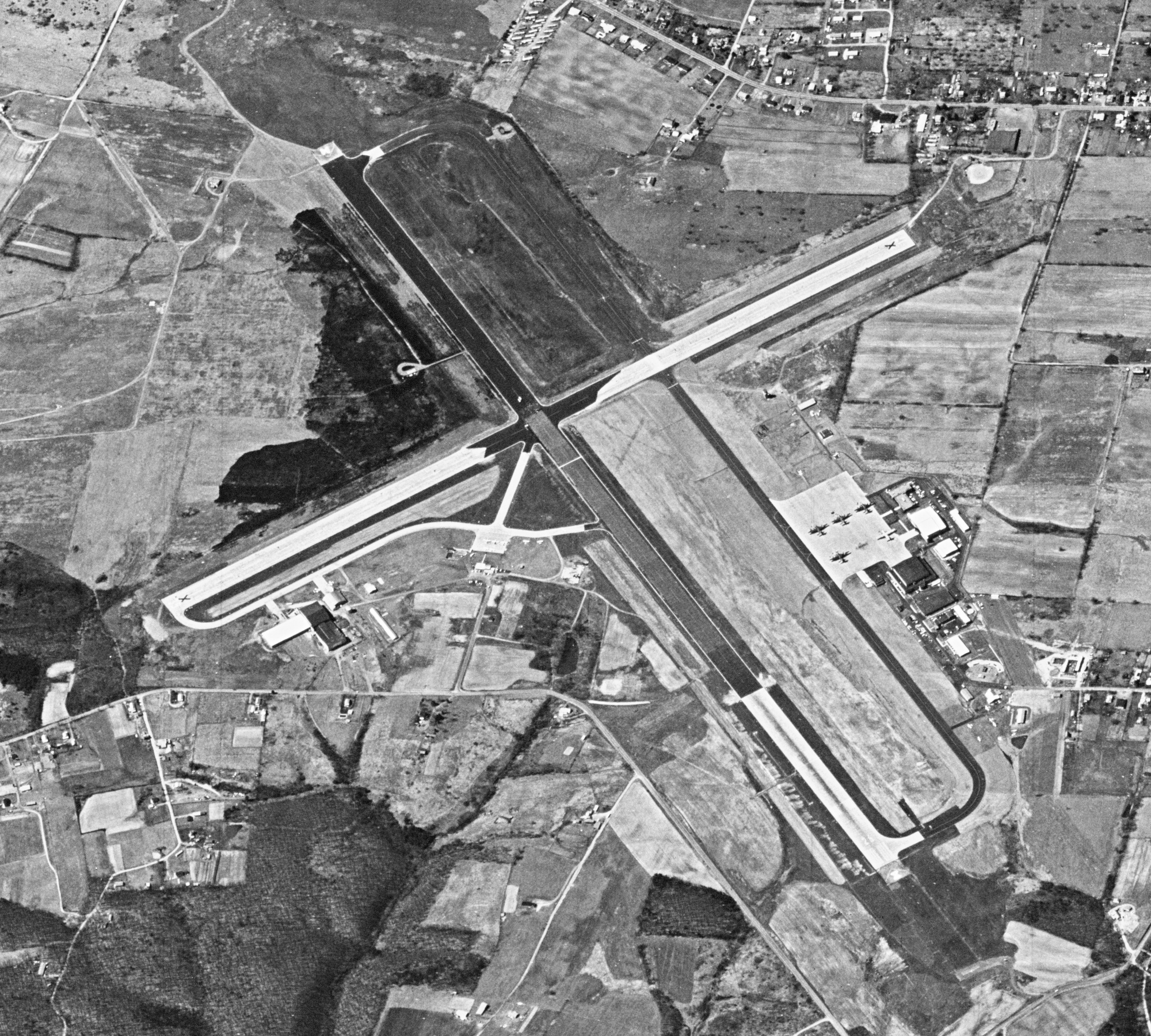
The airport in 1976

Eastern West Virginia Regional Airport (IATA: MRB, ICAO: KMRB, FAA LID: MRB), also known as Shepherd Field, is a civilian-owned, public use airport located four nautical miles (5 mi, 7 km) south of the central business district of Martinsburg, a city in Berkeley County, West Virginia, United States. It is owned by the Eastern West Virginia Regional Airport Authority or EWVRAA. This airport is included in the National Plan of Integrated Airport Systems for 2011–2015, in which the Federal Aviation Administration categorized it as a reliever airport.

The airport is mostly used for general aviation. The airport authority’s fixed base operator, MRB Aviation offers many services including Air Charter, Aircraft Management, Flight Training (with partner Bravo Flight Training), Aircraft Maintenance, Fuel Sales and Hangar Rentals. The EWVRAA has entered into a joint-use agreement with the West Virginia Air National Guard's 167th Airlift Wing (167 AW), having a presence since 1955 at the adjacent Shepherd Field Air National Guard Base. The 167 AW is an Air Mobility Command (AMC)-gained unit which began operating the Boeing C-17 Globemaster III aircraft in January 2015. Prior to receiving the C-17, the airport had hosted a fleet of larger Lockheed C-5A Galaxy transport aircraft since 2007.

Beginning in July 2006 and running through the fall of 2012, the airport underwent a major improvement program which included the removal of the secondary runway 17/35, an expansion to the primary runway 08/26, and the construction of larger parking areas needed to accommodate the C-5A Galaxy aircraft. This project also included the addition of a new Air Traffic Control tower, Aircraft Rescue and Firefighting station, and hangars for the C-5As, as the existing hangars designed to house the Lockheed C-130H Hercules were grossly inadequate considering the size of the larger plane. Also in this time period was the construction of a new entrance to the base, three 80,000-square-foot hangars with a maintenance mall, base supply, operations facility, simulator facility, fuel facility and tank farm.

In previous decades, the WVANG also flew many other aircraft types including the F-51 Mustang and F-86 Sabre fighters. The 167th Airlift Wing held an open house in conjunction with the Thunder Over the Blue Ridge Air Show on September 4 and 5, 2010. The United States Air Force Thunderbirds and the United States Army Parachute Team attended the show which drew a crowd of more than 80,000 people.

== History ==
Eastern West Virginia Regional Airport has had airline service through the years into the early 1970s, including Allegheny, Lake Central, and Cumberland Airlines. The last Lake Central timetable before merging with Allegheny in 1968 showed three flights a day, with one to Elkins, WV, and two to Baltimore, using Nord 262 prop jets. After the merger Allegheny continued to serve the airport for several years. Allegheny eventually upgraded the aircraft to Convair 580 prop jets and the nonstop service changed to Washington (DCA) and Clarksburg, WV, with three or four departures a day. By 1973 all commercial airline service had ended and was directed through the nearby airport at Hagerstown, Maryland.

== Facilities and aircraft ==
The airport covers an area of 998 acres (411 ha) at an elevation of 565 feet (172 m) above mean sea level. It has one runway designated 08/26 with a primarily asphalt surface with portions composed of portland cement concrete (PCC) measuring 8,815 by 150 feet (2,687 x 46 m). This runway also features paved asphalt shoulders of 25 feet on either side laterally and two additional 400-foot paved blast pads on either runway end, making the total paved surface dimensions approximately 9,615 feet in length and 200 feet in width (2,931 x 61 m), by far the largest runway in the state of West Virginia.

For the 12-month period ending May 31, 2018, the airport had 29,303 aircraft operations, an average of 80 per day: 79% general aviation, 20% military, and 1% air taxi. At that time there were 93 aircraft based at this airport: 78% single-engine, 10% multi-engine, 2% helicopter, 1% civilian jet and 9% military.

== See also ==
- List of airports in West Virginia
