= Shepherd Field Air National Guard Base =

Air base in the US

- Near Martinsburg, West Virginia in the United States
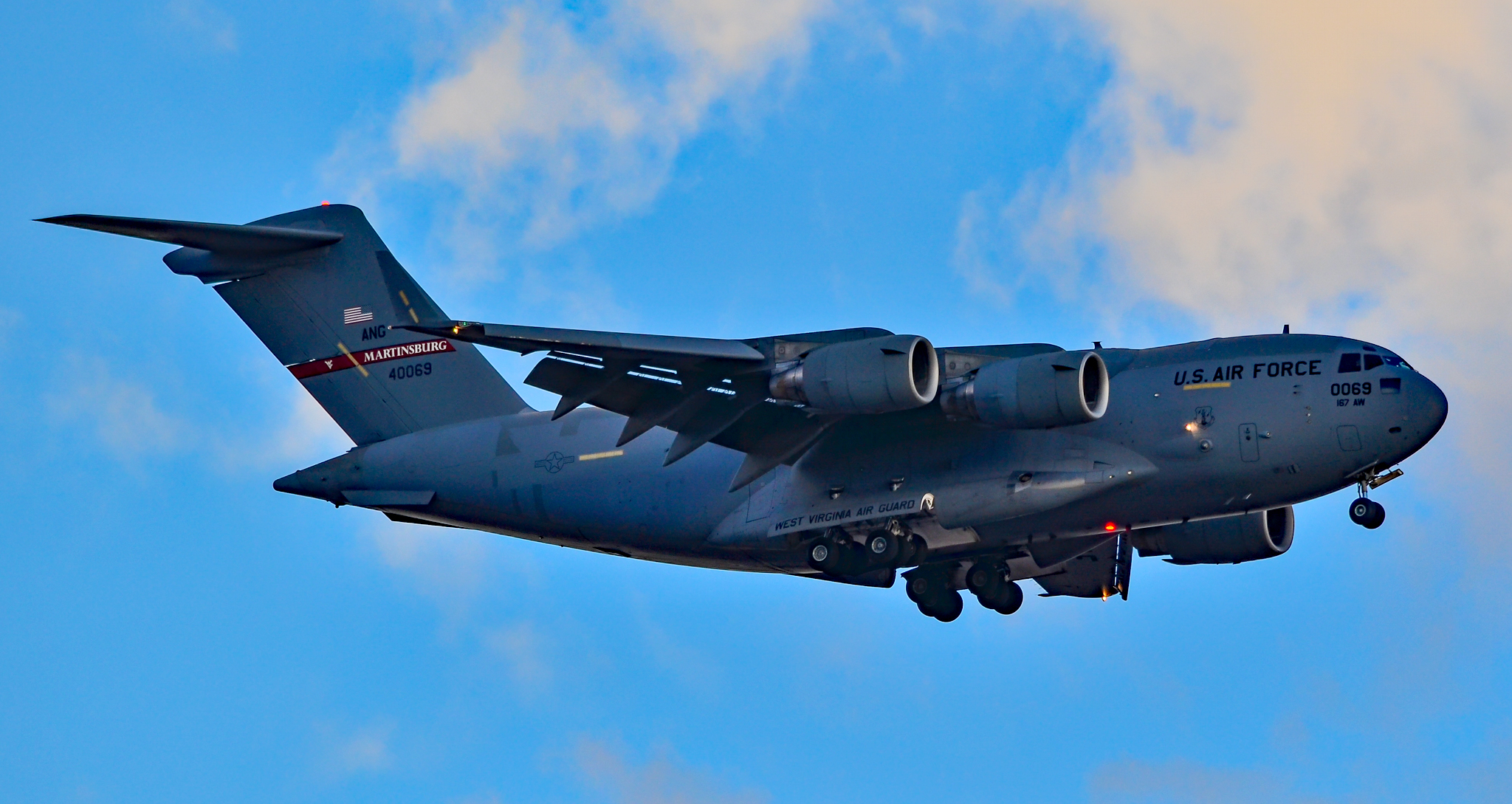
- A C-17A Globemaster III assigned to the 167th Airlift Wing of the West Virginia Air National Guard, based at Shepherd Field ANGB.

Site information
- Type: Air National Guard Base
- Owner: Department of Defense
- Operator: US Air Force (USAF)
- Controlled by: West Virginia Air National Guard
- Condition: Operational
- Website: www.167aw.ang.af.mil

Location
- Coordinates: 39°24′07″N 77°59′04″W

Site history
- Built: 1955
- In use: 1955 – present

Garrison information
- Garrison: 167th Airlift Wing (host)

Airfield information
- Identifiers: IATA: MRB, ICAO: KMRB, FAA LID: MRB, WMO: 724177
- Elevation: 172.2 metres (565 ft) AMSL
Runways
Direction	Length and surface
8/26	2,686.8 metres (8,815 ft) Asphalt/Grooved
- Airfield shared with Eastern West Virginia Regional Airport. Source: Federal Aviation Administration

Shepherd Field Air National Guard Base is the home base of the West Virginia Air National Guard 167th Airlift Wing located at the Eastern West Virginia Regional Airport, 4 miles south of Martinsburg, West Virginia.

== Environmental issues ==
As of May 2016 the U.S. Air Force has been investigating whether industrial chemicals have seeped from the 167th Airlift Wing base into the groundwater.

In August 2014, the Air Force had found 10 areas where aqueous film forming foam may have entered the soil including "a former fire-training area, three hangars, two buildings, a fire-truck testing area, two storage areas and a wastewater-treatment area". The military seeks to determine if the compounds are present, and if they seeped into the groundwater.

The Eastern West Virginia Regional Airport is in the Big Springs wellhead-protection area for the city's water supply.

== See also ==
West Virginia National Guard
