= 167th Airlift Wing =

167th Airlift Wing

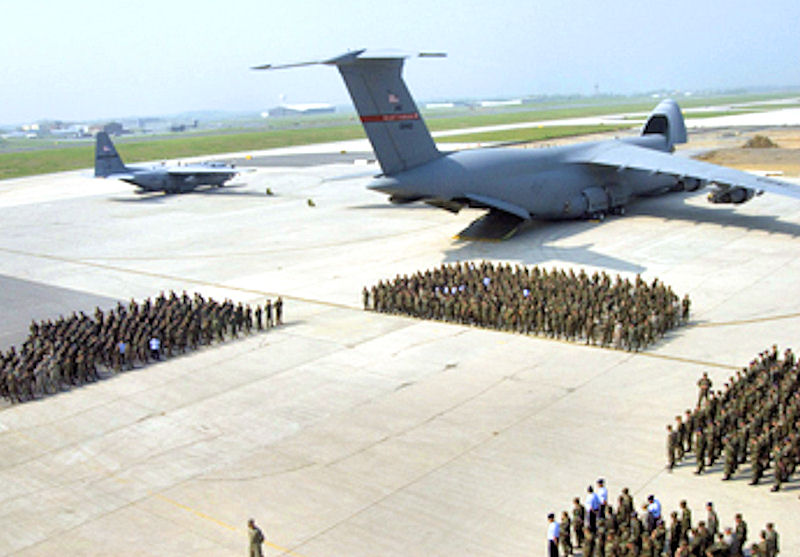
- 167th Airlift Wing receiving its first C-5 Galaxy, 4 December 2006
- Active: 1963–1972; 1972–present
- Country: United States
- Allegiance: West Virginia
- Branch: Air National Guard
- Type: Wing
- Role: Airlift
- Part of: West Virginia Air National Guard
- Garrison/HQ: Shepherd Field Air National Guard Base, West Virginia
- Motto: Mountaineer Pride Worldwide
- Decorations: Air Force Outstanding Unit Award

Insignia
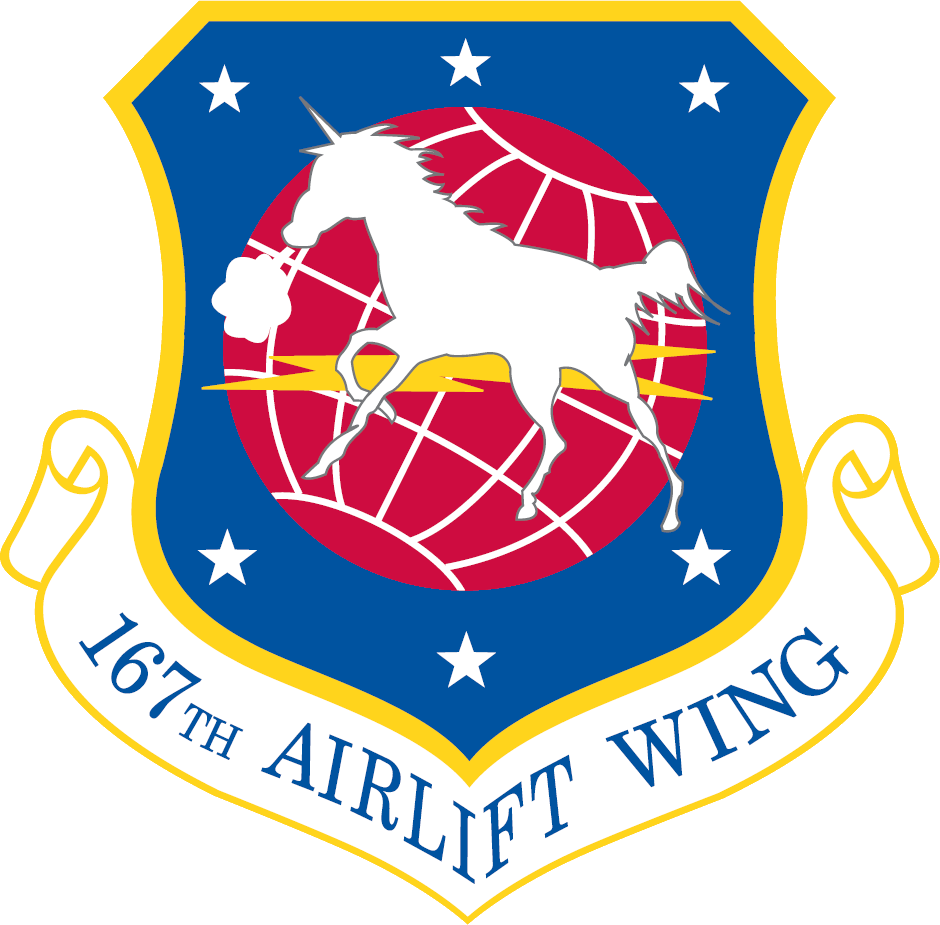
- 167th Airlift Wing emblem
- Tail stripe: Red tail stripe "Martinsburg"

Aircraft flown
- Transport: C-17 Globemaster III

The 167th Airlift Wing is a unit of the West Virginia Air National Guard, stationed at Shepherd Field Air National Guard Base, Martinsburg, West Virginia. If activated to federal service, the Wing is gained by the United States Air Force Air Mobility Command.

== Mission ==
The 167th Airlift Wing of the West Virginia Air National Guard is an airlift unit that flies the C-17 Globemaster III aircraft. The unit has deployed to the four corners of the Earth in support of the global war on terrorism and continues to support this effort. The 167th's focus today, and in the future, is summed up in the unit's motto: "Mountaineer Pride Worldwide."

The unit has been active in numerous exercises such as Sentry Storm, Volant Oak, Rodeos, and various overseas deployments; for example, 1981, and again in 1988, all aircraft deployed to Europe a first for any unit.

== Units ==
The 167th Airlift Wing is composed of the following units:

- 167th Operations Group

: 167th Airlift Squadron

- 167th Maintenance Group
- 167th Mission Support Group
- 167th Medical Group

== History ==
The 167th Tactical Airlift Group, was activated on 3 June 1972 when authorization was granted to expand the 167th Tactical Airlift Squadron to group level. The 167th was gained by Tactical Airlift Command if mobilized and flew C-130A Hercules transports. Late in 1977, the unit received Lockheed C-130B Hercules aircraft. The 1986, the number of aircraft assigned increased, and in 1989, the C-130B was replaced with the C-130E.

Initially, the base at the Eastern West Virginia Regional Airport had only one hangar, a motor pool, and a supply building. Many major additions have since been made to the base, including a fire hall, base operations building, nose dock, civil engineering building, corrosion control/fuel cell facility, engine shop, aerospace ground equipment shop, barracks, clinic, avionics shop and aerial port building.

On Sunday, 8 July 1984, the group reached 100,000 hours of safe flying, only the fifth Air Guard unit to achieve this goal. In 1987, the unit received an Operational Readiness Inspection from Military Airlift Command. The unit received eight outstanding, twelve excellent and one satisfactory rating among the various components of the unit. Other awards during this period include the fourth Air Force Outstanding Unit Award received in 1988 and the Distinguished Unit Flying Award from the National Guard Association in 1989.

The conversion in July 1989 to the newer C-130E broadened the group's capabilities with the ability to airdrop during adverse weather and transport an additional 20,000 pounds of cargo.

In 1990, the unit came to the aid of communities, providing relief efforts for victims of Hurricane Hugo and the California earthquake. Supplies were also flown to Puerto Rico, which had been devastated by the hurricane. Also in 1990, members of the Aeromedical Evacuation Flight, Mobile Aerial Port Squadron, Tactical Airlift Squadron and Consolidated Aircraft Maintenance Squadron, along with support personnel from other areas were the first called to volunteer to take part in Operation Desert Shield. They did so, with many leaving on only a few hours' notice.

Reorganization and realignment put the 167th's mobilization with Air Combat Command during this time frame. Another first for the 167th was the receipt of a new C-130H-3 on 21 December 1994. Greeted by Santa Claus upon its arrival, the aircraft is the first new plane received by the unit in its history. Previous conversions had been to newer models, but not just off the assembly line.

In early 1995, while flying the C-130E version of the Hercules, the by now renamed 167th Airlift Group (167 AG) began conversion training for the C-130H-3 variant in the first quarter, transferring most of their "E" models to the Illinois Air National Guard's 182d Airlift Wing in Peoria, Illinois. The 167th's civil engineers deployed to Panama and the medical squadron deployed to Honduras that year, while most of the sections took part in a deployment to Alpena, Michigan, in September where chemical exercises and other special training took place. The unit celebrated its 40th anniversary on 10 June 1995. In 1995, the unit began conversion training for the C-130H-3 in the first quarter and transferred most of the "E" models to Peoria, Illinois.

The 167th Airlift Group was redesignated the 167th Airlift Wing on 1 October 1995 and as it became operationall in the C-130H-3 aircraft to perform its airlift mission. Then on 16 April 1997, the 167th Airlift Wing was reallocated to the Air Mobility Command (AMC), with no change in mission or assignment. The 2005 Base Realignment and Closure Commission converted the wing's aircraft from the C-130 Hercules to the Lockheed C-5 Galaxy.

In March 2002, West Virginia Senator Robert Byrd announced that the unit would transition to the C-5 Galaxy aircraft. On 4 December 2006 the first C-5 aircraft assigned to the unit landed at Shepherd Field. Ten more aircraft were assigned to the 167th Airlift Wing throughout the following two years.

On 28 March 2007 the unit launched its first C-5 mission from Shepherd Air Field. After a brief stop at Dover Air Force Base, the aircraft continued on to Camp Lemonier, Djibouti, Africa, delivering two CH-53E Super Stallion helicopters (used for humanitarian assistance, personnel and equipment movement, and noncombatant casualty evacuations) and more than 60 marines supporting Combined Joint Task Force - Horn of Africa. In February 2012, the Force Structure Overview was released by the Secretary of the Air Force. The document detailed numerous aircraft changes throughout the active, Guard and Reserve forces, including the replacement of the unit's C-5 aircraft with McDonnell Douglas C-17 Globemaster IIIs. On 25 September 2014, the 167th Airlift Wing flew its final C-5 mission, a local training sortie. That same day the wing received its first C-17 Globemaster III aircraft, one of eight C-17s the unit is slated to receive.

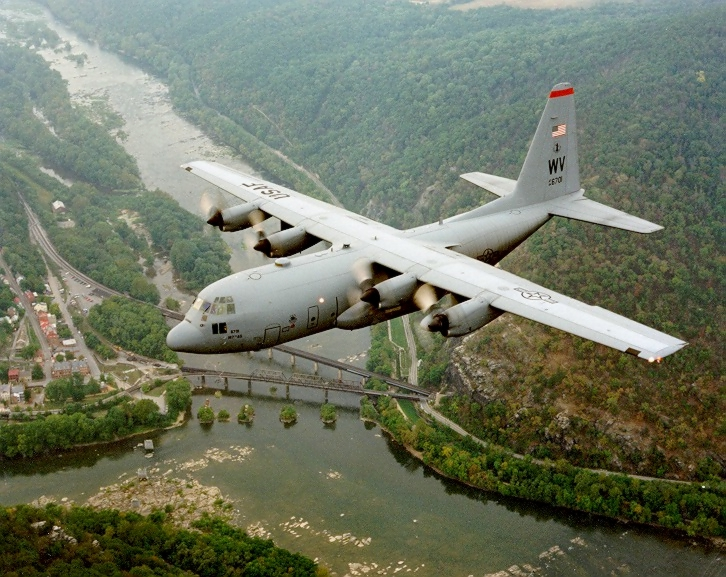
A 167th AW C-130H over Harpers Ferry.

The wing participated in an Operational Readiness Evaluation and Inspection (ORI) in 1998 at the Combat Readiness Training Center, Savannah, Georgia. At the conclusion of the ORI, the 167th received its first ever overall Outstanding rating. Since the 11 Sept. 2001, terrorist attacks on New York City and Washington, D.C., the unit has had members deployed to the four corners of the world in support of Operations Enduring Freedom and Iraqi Freedom. Unit members have received six Bronze Stars and two Purple Hearts in support of these operations.

== Lineage ==
167th Aeromedical Airlift Group

- Established as the 167th Air Transport Group, Heavy on 16 December 1963

Activated on 16 December 1963
Redesignated 167th Military Airlift Group on 1 January 1966
Redesignated 167th Aeromedical Airlift Group on 10 August 1968
Inactivated on 3 June 1972
Consolidated with the 167th Tactical Airlift Group on 18 August 1987

167th Airlift Wing

- Established as the 167th Tactical Airlift Group on 30 May 1972

Activated on 3 June 1972
Consolidated with the 167th Aeromedicl Airlift Group on 18 August 1987
Redesignated 167th Airlift Group on 3 June 1992
Redesignated 167th Airlift Wing on 1 October 1995

=== Assignments ===
- 116th Air Transport Wing, 16 December 1963
- 171st Air Transport Wing (later 171st Military Airlift Wing, 171st Aeromedical Airlift Wing), 15 March 1964 – 3 June 1972
- 133d Tactical Airlift Wing, 3 July 1972
- West Virginia Air National Guard, 1 October 1995 – present

=== Gaining commands ===
- Military Air Transport Service
- Military Airlift Command
- Tactical Air Command
- Military Airlift Command, 1 December 1974
- Air Mobility Command, 1 June 1992
- Air Combat Command, 1 December 1993 – 1 October 1995
- Air Mobility Command

=== Components ===
- 167th Operations Group, 1 October 1995 – Present
- 167th Air Transport Squadron (later 167th Military Airlift Squadron, 167th Aeromedicl Airlift Squadron, 167th Tactical Airlift Squadron, 167th Airlif) Squadron, 16 December 1963 –3 June 1972, 3 June 1972 – 1 October 1995

=== Stations ===
- Sheppard Field, West Virginia, 16 Dec 1962 – 3 June 1972, 3 June 1972 –

Designated: Shepherd Field Air National Guard Base, West Virginia, 1991 – present

=== Aircraft ===
- C-119 Flying Boxcar, 1961-63
- C-121 Constellation, 1963-71
- C-130 Hercules, 1971-2006
- C-5 Galaxy, 2006–2014
- C-17 Globemaster III, 2015–present
