= West Virginia Air National Guard =

- Emblem of the West Virginia Air National Guard
- Active: 7 March 1947 - present
- Country: United States
- Allegiance: West Virginia
- Branch: Air National Guard
- Type: State militia, military reserve force
- Role: "To meet state and federal mission responsibilities"
- Part of: West Virginia National Guard; United States National Guard Bureau; National Guard
- Garrison/HQ: West Virginia Air National Guard, 1703 Coonskin Drive, Charleston, West Virginia, 25311
- Website: https://www.wv.ng.mil/About-Us/West-Virginia-Air-National-Guard/

Commanders
- Civilian leadership: President Donald Trump (Commander-in-Chief); Governor Patrick Morrisey (Governor of the State of West Virginia)
- State military leadership: Brig Gen David V. Cochran

Aircraft flown
- Transport: C-130J Super Hercules; C-17 Globemaster III

The West Virginia Air National Guard (WV ANG) is the aerial militia of the State of West Virginia, United States of America. It is, along with the West Virginia Army National Guard, an element of the West Virginia National Guard and United States National Guard Bureau, and is a reserve of the United States Air Force (USAF).

As state militia units, the units in the West Virginia Air National Guard are not in the normal United States Air Force chain of command. They are under the jurisdiction of the governor of West Virginia though the office of the West Virginia Adjutant General unless they are federalized by order of the president of the United States. The West Virginia Air National Guard is headquartered in Charleston, and its commander is Brigadier General David V. Cochran.

Under the "Total Force" concept, West Virginia Air National Guard units are considered to be Air Reserve Components of the USAF. West Virginia ANG units are trained and equipped by the Air Force and are operationally gained by a major command of the USAF if federalized. In addition, the West Virginia Air National Guard forces are assigned to Air Expeditionary Forces and are subject to deployment tasking orders along with their active duty and Air Force Reserve counterparts in their assigned cycle deployment window.

Along with their federal reserve obligations, as state militia units the elements of the West Virginia ANG are subject to being activated by order of the governor to provide protection of life and property, and preserve peace, order and public safety. State missions include disaster relief in times of earthquakes, hurricanes, floods and forest fires, search and rescue, protection of vital public services, and support to civil defense.

== History ==
On May 24, 1946, the United States Army Air Forces, in response to dramatic postwar military budget cuts imposed by President Harry S. Truman, allocated inactive unit designations to the National Guard Bureau for the formation of an Air Force National Guard. These unit designations were allotted and transferred to various State National Guard bureaus to provide them unit designations to re-establish them as Air National Guard units.

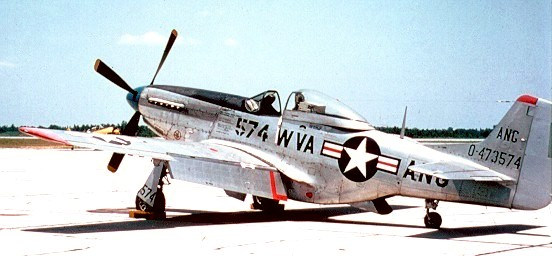
An F-51D Mustang of the 167th Fighter Squadron, which was flown from 1948 to 1957. The West Virginia Air National Guard was the last ANG unit to be equipped with the Mustang in service. The last F-51 (44-72948) was retired to serve as a museum piece at Wright-Patterson Air Force Base on January 27th, 1957.

The West Virginia Air National Guard origins date to March 7, 1947, with the establishment of the 167th Fighter Squadron, which is oldest unit of the West Virginia Air National Guard. Originally equipped with F-51D Mustangs (the new name of the P-51 Mustang after 1947), the 167th Fighter Squadron was federally recognized and activated at Kanawha Airport, Charleston with a primary mission of air defense of the state. However, September 18, 1947, is considered the West Virginia Air National Guard's official birth, which is concurrent with the establishment of the United States Air Force as a separate branch of the United States military under the National Security Act of 1947.

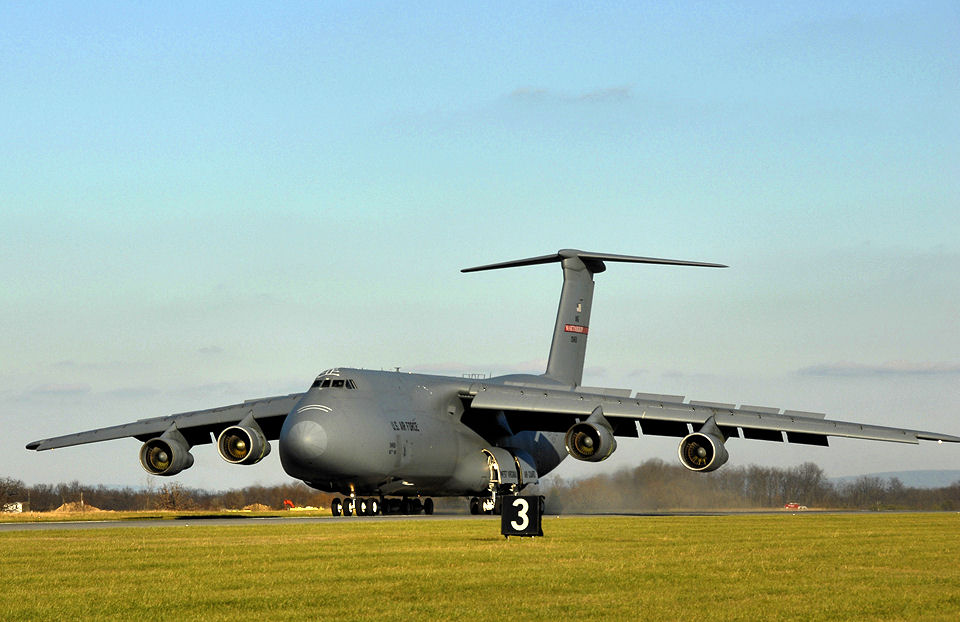
A C-5A Galaxy of the 167th Airlift Squadron at Martinsburg AGB.

On October 10, 1950, the 167th FS and all personnel were sworn in for 21 months of active duty during the Korean War. Most personnel and all aircraft became part of the 123d Fighter-Bomber Wing, located at Godman Army Airfield, Kentucky. Some members transferred to RAF Manston near London, in the United Kingdom, flying F-84 Thunderjet aircraft. Other seasoned (experienced) pilots transferred to Far East Air Force for combat duty in the Korean War. Released from active duty on July 9, 1952, the 167th Fighter Interceptor Squadron (167th FIS) returned to Charleston, West Virginia and resumed flying the F-51 Mustang aircraft.

In the early 1950s, Kanawha Airport could not accommodate jet aircraft, so Shepherd Field in Martinsburg received approval as the new site for the 167th FIS on September 21, 1955. The official move came on December 3, 1955, when the 167th FIS officially relocated from Kanawha Airport to Shepherd Field.

The West Virginia Air National Guard was authorized to expand to two separate aircraft squadrons in 1955 by the National Guard Bureau. On October 1, 1955, the 130th Troop Carrier Squadron (130th TCS) was created at Kanawha Airport, Charleston and was extended federal recognition. This squadron was assigned to Tactical Air Command, which placed it under the Eighteenth Air Force. Equipped with Grumman HU-16 Albatross amphibious aircraft and Curtiss C-46 Commando troop transport aircraft, the primary mission of the 130th TCS was Air Commando special operations missions. On July 1, 1960, the HU-16 and C-46 were replaced by C-119 Flying Boxcar and U-10D Super Courier combat observation aircraft. In 1975, both of these aircraft were replaced by the far more capable C-130E Hercules transport aircraft, with a second upgrade to the C-130H Hercules completed in 1986. Today, the 130th Airlift Wing (130 AW) provides tactical airlift support to Air Force, Navy and Marine Corps and other allied nations through the continued use of the C-130H Hercules.

The 167th Airlift Wing (167 AW) provides global airlift to Air Mobiity Command, with its C-17 Globemaster III transports operating globally in support of the active-duty missions of the Air Force.

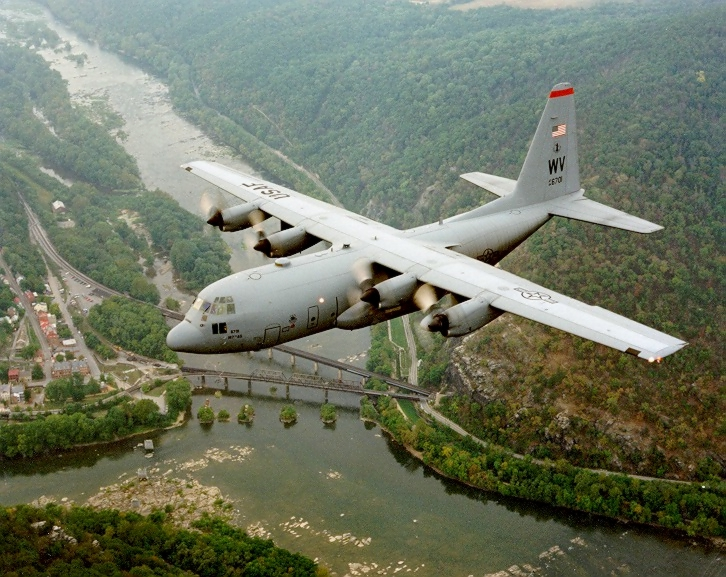
A C-130H Hercules of the West Virginia Air National Guard flying over Harpers Ferry, the junction of the Potomac and Shenandoah (left) rivers

After the September 11th, 2001 terrorist attacks on the United States, elements of every Air National Guard unit in West Virginia has been activated in support of the global war on terrorism. Flight crews, aircraft maintenance personnel, communications technicians, air controllers and air security personnel were engaged in Operation Noble Eagle air defense overflights of major United States cities. Also, West Virginia ANG units have been deployed overseas as part of Operation Enduring Freedom in Afghanistan and Operation Iraqi Freedom in Iraq as well as other locations as directed.

On May 13, 2005, the Department of Defense released its Base Realignment and Closure, 2005 (BRAC) report, and the 130th Airlift Wing was one of the units scheduled for decommission. Its eight C-130H aircraft would be reassigned to Pope Air Force Base, and its expeditionary combat support (ECS) personnel would be transferred to the 167th Airlift Wing.

Upon learning of this recommendation, several former commanders of the 130th Airlift Wing along with members of the local Kanawha County Commission and the Yeager Airport Board of Directors formed the Keep 'Em Flying grassroots organization to try to prevent the unit from being decommissioned. Following an outpouring of community support, money was raised for newspaper ads and radio ads, and to hire analysts familiar with BRAC, all in an attempt to save the unit. On June 13, 2005, members of the BRAC commission came to Charleston to evaluate the base and talk to General Tackett, Governor Joe Manchin, Senator Robert Byrd, Congresswoman Shelley Moore Capito and Col. Bill Peters, Jr., former commander of the 130th and chair for Keep 'Em Flying.

Following this visit, and taking in all the information that was presented to them during that time, the BRAC commission voted unanimously to keep the 130th AW intact.

== Components ==
The West Virginia Air National Guard consists of two major units:

- 130th Airlift Wing

Established as 130th Airlift Wing on 1 October 1995; operates the Lockheed C-130J Super Hercules
Stationed at: Yeager Airport (McLaughlin Air National Guard Base), Charleston
Gained by: Air Mobility Command
The 130th Airlift Wing provides tactical airlift in support of the United States Air Force and the State of West Virginia.

- 167th Airlift Wing

Established 7 March 1947 (as: 167th Fighter Squadron); operates: C-17 Globemaster III
Stationed at: Shepherd Field Air National Guard Base, Martinsburg
Gained by: Air Mobility Command
The 167th Airlift Wing provides strategic airlift in support of the United States Air Force.

== See also ==
- West Virginia Wing Civil Air Patrol
