= Operation Support Hope =

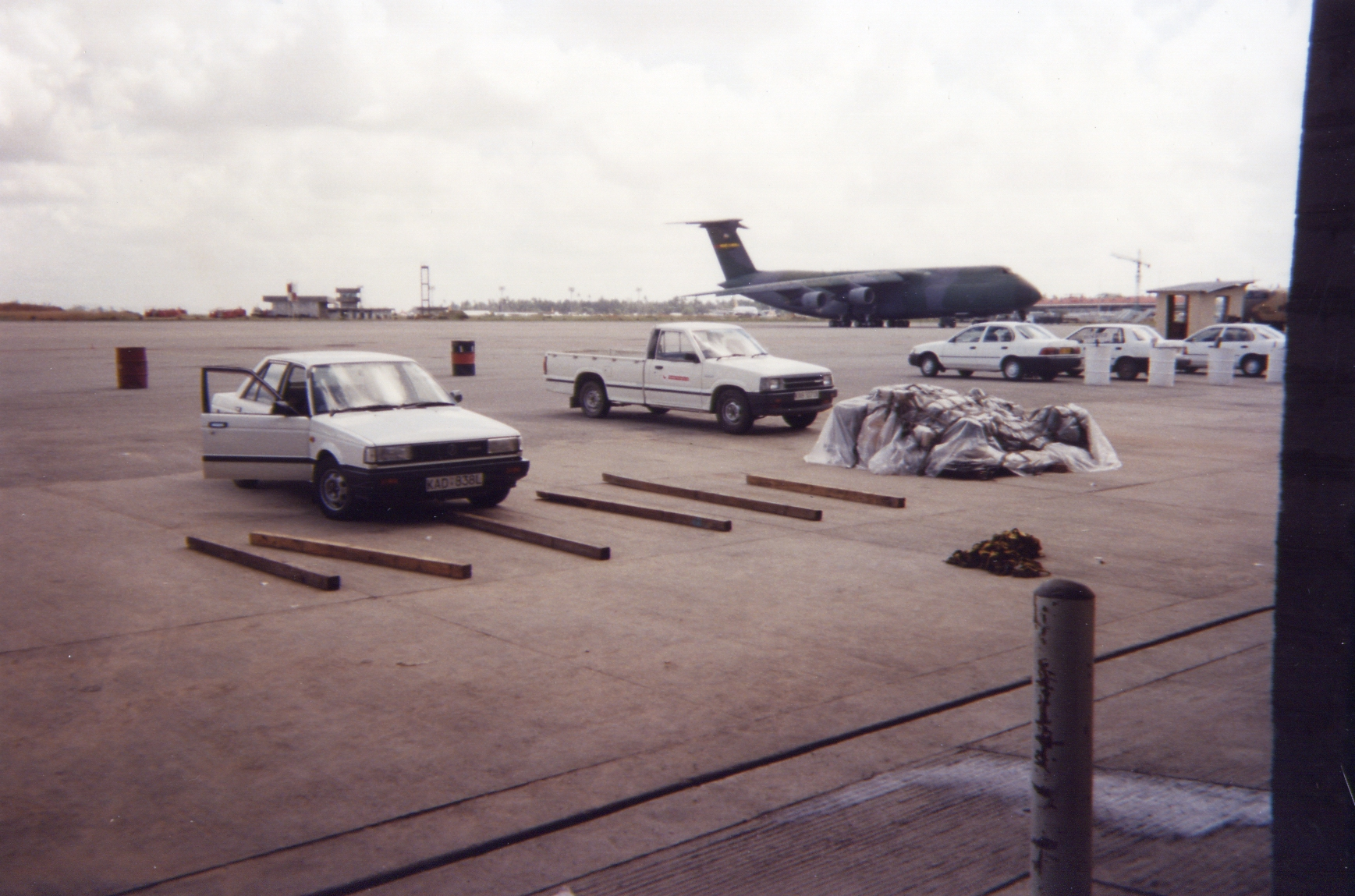
C-5 Galaxy cargo jet participating in Operation Support Hope at Moi International Airport, Mombasa, Kenya in July 1994.

Operation Support Hope was a 1994 United States military effort to provide immediate relief for the refugees of the Rwandan genocide and allow a smooth transition to a full United Nations humanitarian management program. The inhabitants of the camp consisted of approximately two million Hutus, participants in the genocide, and the bystanders, who had fled Rwanda as the predominantly Tutsi Rwandan Patriotic Front took control of the country. On July 22, 1994 President Clinton announced Operation Support Hope. Two days later, American joint task forces were airlifted to Goma, Zaire; Kigali, Rwanda; Entebbe, Uganda; and Mombasa, Kenya. U.S. Air Force liaison officers were assigned to the United Nations High Commissioner for Refugees (UNHCR) air operations cell in Geneva and assigned to joint logistics cells and civil-military operations centers in the field.

The joint task force was headquartered in Entebbe, with the role of providing a cargo airlift to supplement United Nations efforts. The United States Army almost immediately set up a major water supply system at the refugee camp in Goma and helped bury the dead. Relief supplies were flown from Europe directly to African locations by C-5 and C-141 cargo jets, which then ferried to Mombasa due to scarcity of fuel in the African interior, and then returned to Europe. Due to limited ramp space, some aircraft were forced into holding patterns; their fuel requirements were met by KC-10 tanker aircraft based at Harare, Zimbabwe. C-130 aircraft from Ramstein Air Base, Germany, Pope Air Force Base, NC and Kulis Air National Guard Base, Alaska deployed to Entebbe, Uganda and shuttled relief cargo, US Army water filtration systems, and medical teams from Doctors Without Borders to remote locations throughout the region.

On August 14, the United Nations High Commissioner for Refugees (UNHCR) requested that all agencies stop airlifting food to Goma. The operation continued supporting other locations in Rwanda. By presidential order, it ceased on September 27 and the last C-5 involved in the airlift left Entebbe on September 29.

During operations a C-5 flew a record 22-hour flight nonstop from Travis Air Force Base, California to Goma to deliver a water supply system, supported by 3 aerial refuelings.

== See also ==
- Operation Restore Hope, a humanitarian mission to Somalia in 1992.
- Great Lakes refugee crisis
