= James M. Canty =

American educator, school administrator, and businessperson

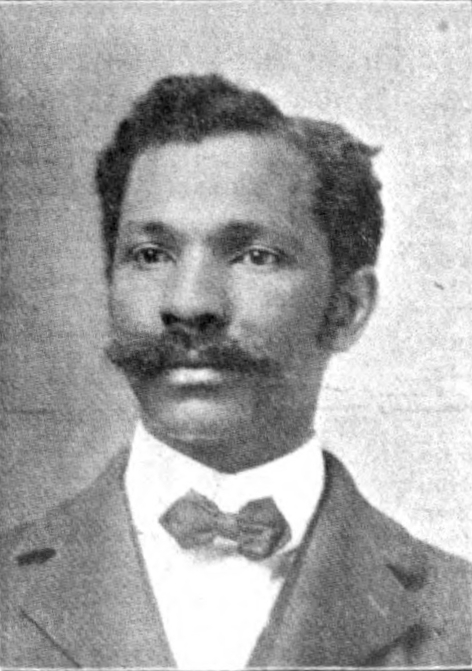
- Photographic portrait of Canty, published in 1906

Acting President of West Virginia State University
- In office 1898
- Preceded by: John H. Hill
- Succeeded by: James McHenry Jones

Superintendent of Mechanical Industries at West Virginia State University
- In office 1893–1914
- Preceded by: Position established
- Succeeded by: Albert C. Spurlock

Personal details
- Born: December 23, 1865 Marietta, Georgia, U.S.
- Died: February 16, 1964 (aged 98) Institute, West Virginia, U.S.
- Resting place: Institute Cemetery
- Spouse(s): Sarah J. Harris Canty; Florence Lovett Canty
- Children: 8
- Education: Tuskegee Normal and Industrial Institute
- Profession: Educator, school administrator, and businessperson

James Munroe Canty (Note: Canty's 1964 death certificate and obituaries in the Charleston Daily Mail and The Charleston Gazette list the spelling of his middle name as "Munroe," however, his name was sometimes spelled as "Monroe.") (December 23, 1865 – February 16, 1964) was an American educator, school administrator, and businessperson. Canty was an acting principal of the West Virginia Colored Institute (present-day West Virginia State University) in 1898 and is considered by West Virginia State as an acting president. (Note: West Virginia State University was founded as the West Virginia Colored Institute in 1891, and was later known as West Virginia Collegiate Institute (1915), West Virginia State College (1929), and finally West Virginia State University (2004). Canty was titled acting principal during his tenure; however, West Virginia State University considers previous principals as its presidents.) Canty also served as the superintendent of Mechanical Industries for West Virginia Colored Institute from 1893 through 1914.

Canty was born in 1865 (Note: In his 1905 autobiographical sketch in Tuskegee and Its People: Their Ideals and Achievements, Canty lists his birthdate as December 23, 1863; however, his gravestone at Institute Cemetery and his death certificate list his birthdate as December 23, 1865. The 1865 birthdate aligns with Canty's obituary in the Charleston Daily Mail which listed his age at death as 98.) in Marietta, Georgia, to former slaves. He attended public school from an early age, and worked numerous trades with his father, including as a carpenter, butcher, ironworker, and farmer. Following a friend's recommendation, Canty began attending Tuskegee Normal and Industrial Institute in 1886 and graduated from the institute in 1890. After graduation, Canty served as the institute's commandant and head of its night school. When he returned to Marietta, he applied his trade in machinery at a carriage shop. After a year in Marietta, Canty received a letter from Booker T. Washington requesting he write to James Edwin Campbell, principal of the West Virginia Colored Institute in Farm, West Virginia (present-day Institute, West Virginia). He was hired as the superintendent of mechanics and began his tenure there in 1893. Canty established a drill team and a military training corps for students, which evolved to become the institute's Reserve Officers' Training Corps (ROTC) unit. In the summer of 1898, Canty served as the institute's acting principal.

Later in life, Canty served as first vice president and as a director of the Mutual Savings and Loan Company in Charleston, West Virginia, which was the city's African-American bank. As an officer and director of the bank, Canty co-founded two companies to develop trading routes and relationships with Haiti, Africa, and British Guiana in 1922: the Overseas Navigation Corporation and the Overseas Trading Company. In 1950, West Virginia State College's ROTC unit honored Canty for his involvement in the college's military training corps program. Following an extended illness, Canty died at his residence in Institute in 1964 at the age of 98. His residence, Canty House, is on West Virginia State University's campus, houses the university's Athletic Hall of Fame, and is listed on the National Register of Historic Places.

== Early life and education ==
James Munroe Canty was born on December 23, 1865, in Marietta, Georgia. His parents, James Munroe Canty Sr. and Adella Canty, were former slaves; Canty was the eldest child of two sons and three daughters. He attended public school from an early age and worked with his father, who was a carpenter, butcher, and ironworker. Canty's father also ran for election for a seat in the Georgia General Assembly but lost by a few votes. From the age of 16, Canty worked as the principal butcher at his father's meat market. After his father had become the custodian of streets in Marietta, Canty worked as a street laborer. When his father took up farming, Canty again followed suit and assisted him on the farm.

After continuing to follow his father into one trade after another, Canty joined other young men in attending night school for his self-improvement. He began working in a carriage factory. There, a female student at the Tuskegee Normal and Industrial Institute gave him a newspaper containing an article about the institute's campus, faculty, and students. She contacted Booker T. Washington on Canty's behalf and subsequently informed him that if he relocated to the institute in Tuskegee, Alabama, Washington would enable him to attend the institute. Canty's father was opposed to his attending Tuskegee and advised him to remain in night school in Marietta. Despite his father's opposition, Canty relocated to Tuskegee to attend the institute in March 1886.

== Tuskegee Normal and Industrial Institute ==
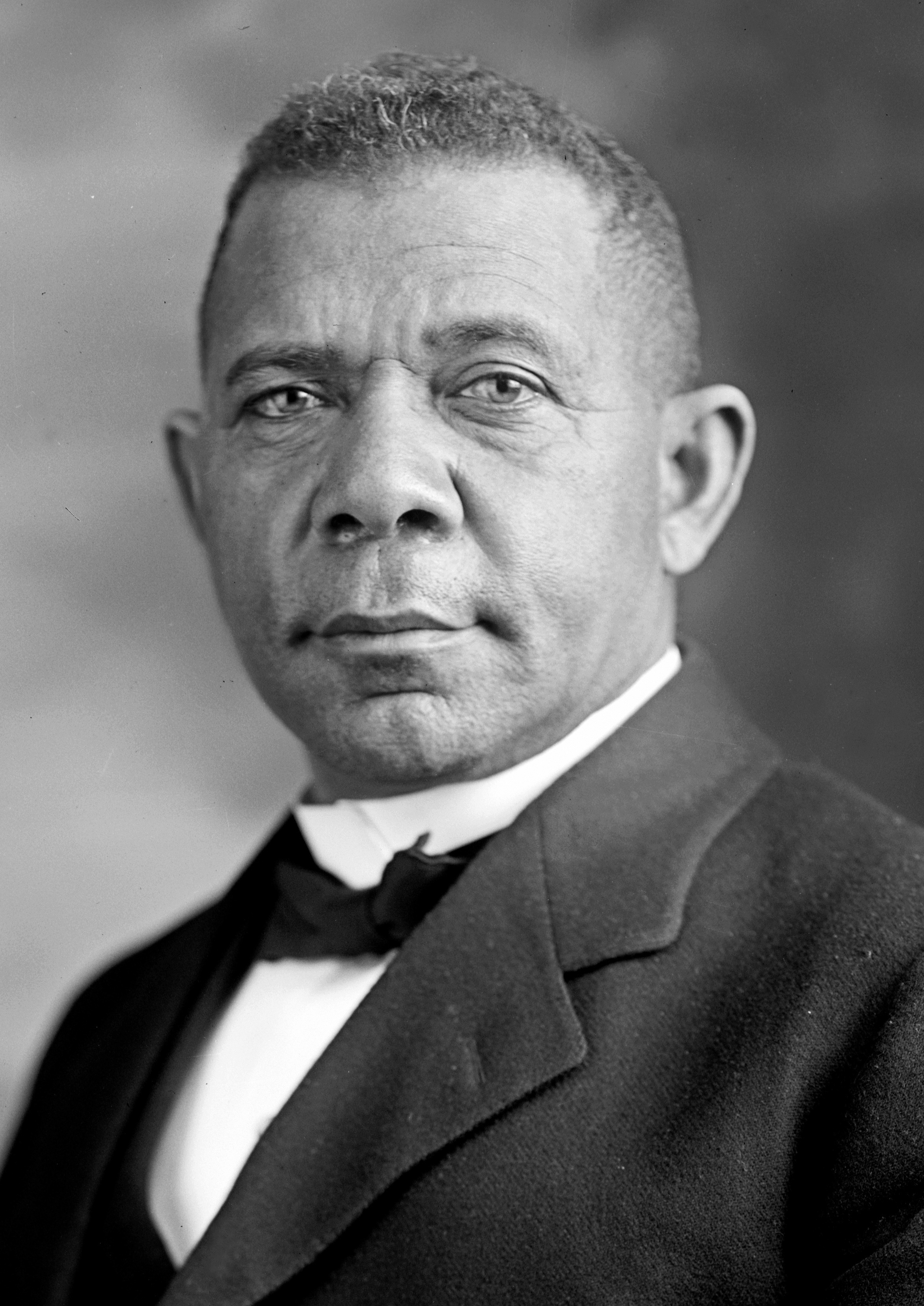
Booker T. Washington

Canty matriculated into Tuskegee's night school to earn his tuition and expenses for day school and was assigned to the institute's blacksmith shop. While attending Tuskegee, Margaret Murray Washington's positive engagement with its students, and the encouragement he received from the school's superintendent of industries, John H. Washington, influenced Canty. Before he graduated from Tuskegee, Booker T. Washington hired him as an instructor for the institute's night school and blacksmithing shop. He graduated from the institute on May 29, 1890, and delivered a speech entitled, "The True Leader" at his commencement ceremony. In its coverage of the commencement, the Montgomery Advertiser described Canty as "a first class blacksmith".

Following graduation, Canty was also hired as the institute's commandant and head of its night school for a year. As the institute's commandant, Canty received the title of "Colonel" as head of its military corps of students. He resigned his positions at Tuskegee to pursue a more lucrative position in the mercantile business.

== Machinery career ==
Canty returned to Marietta and plied his trade at a carriage shop where machine work was done for two furniture factories and a planing mill. He repaired the shop's machinery and produced custom machine components for factories. While he was in Marietta, Canty served as the superintendent of Sunday school at a local church on his father's farm. He also co-founded a literary society and served as its president.

== West Virginia Colored Institute ==
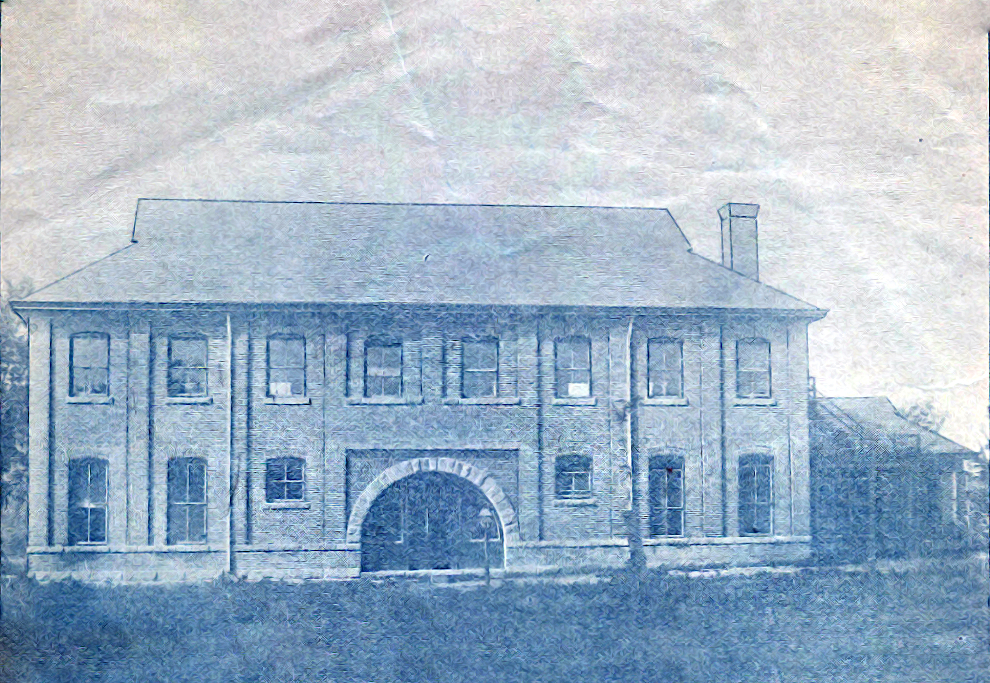
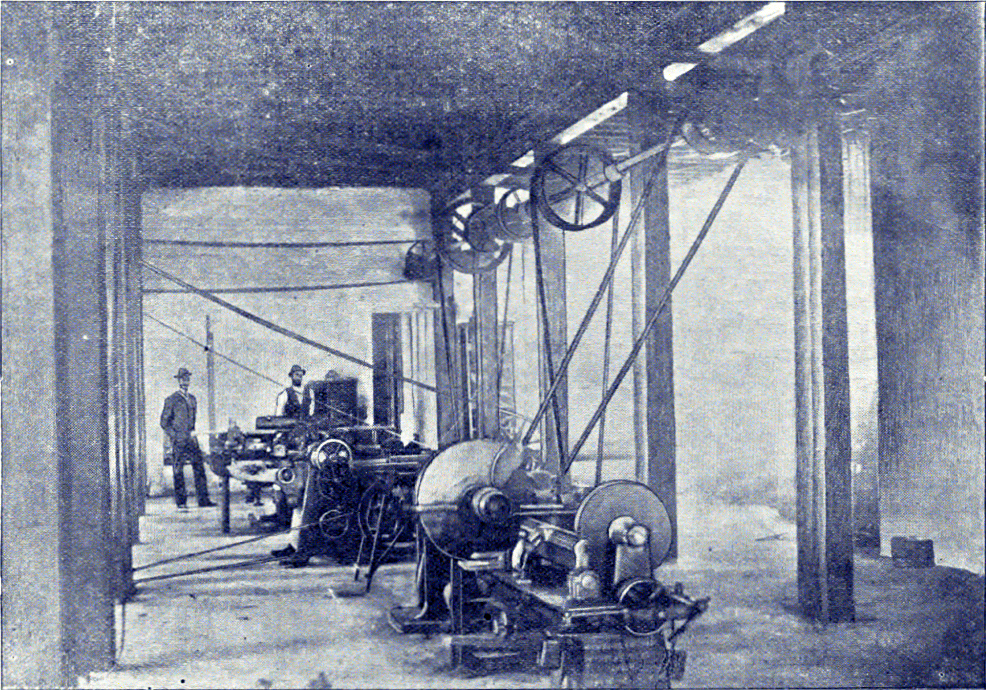
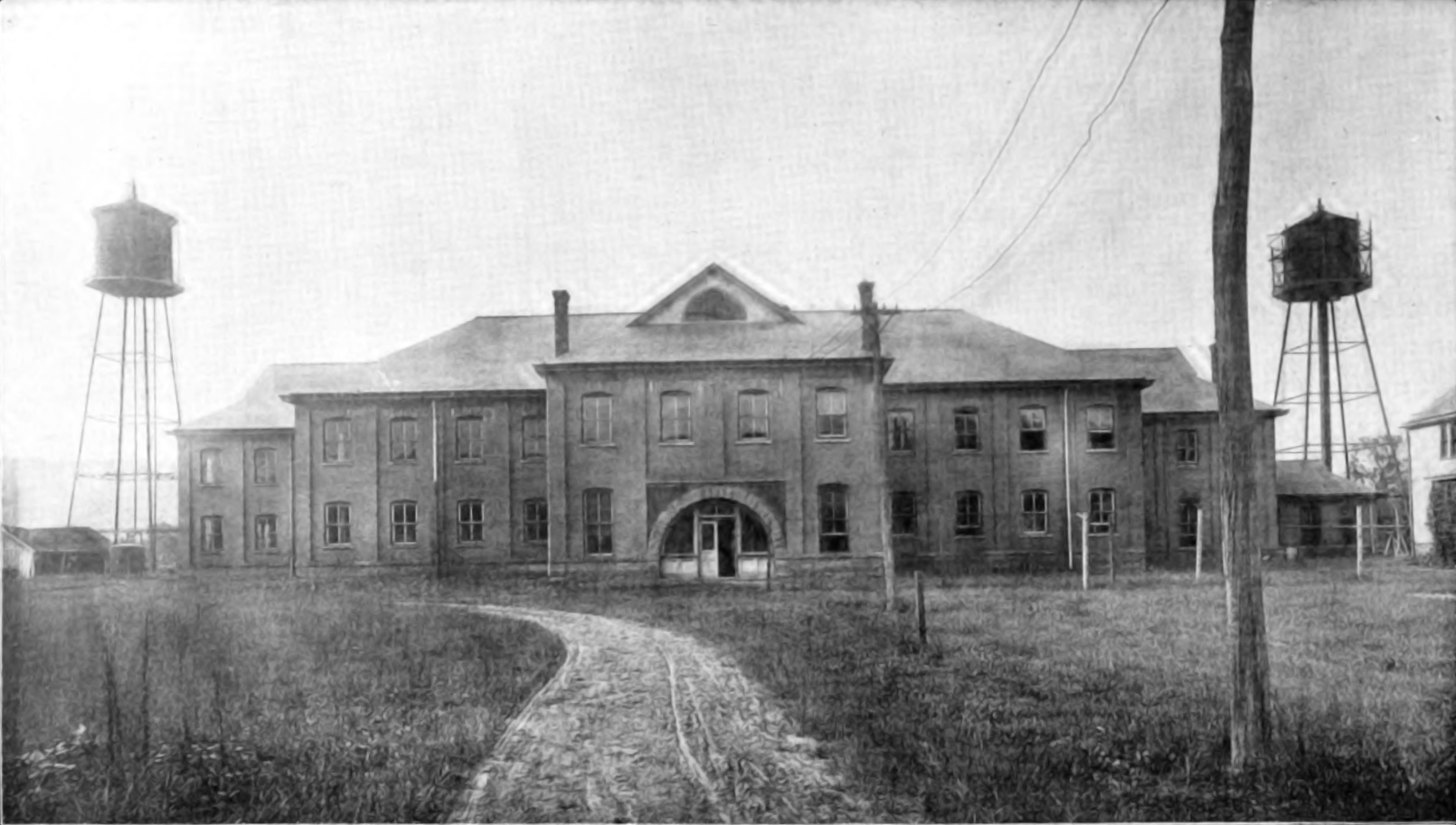
From top to bottom: Exterior and interior views of the Machinery Hall in 1898, and exterior view of the building in 1910 following its expansion into the A. B. White Trades Building

After a year in Marietta, Canty received a letter from Booker T. Washington requesting that he write to James Edwin Campbell, principal of the West Virginia Colored Institute in Farm, West Virginia (present-day Institute, West Virginia). Campbell had written Washington seeking a Tuskegee graduate to serve as superintendent of mechanics at the institute, and Washington recommended Canty for the position. Canty accepted and began his duties as the superintendent of mechanics at the institute on January 3, 1893. He was the third teacher to join the institute's faculty. West Virginia Colored Institute had been founded in 1891 under the Morrill Act of 1890, to provide West Virginia's African Americans with education in agricultural and mechanical studies.

From his arrival in 1893 until the fall of 1898, Canty carried out the school's industrial work and education without assistance. As superintendent of mechanical industries, he taught blacksmithing, carpentry, and mechanical drawing. In addition to teaching, Canty was in charge of campus maintenance and installed the institute's sewerage system and heating systems in its buildings. In his first year, Canty established a drill team at the institute because "he felt that the boys needed discipline". Canty only had one rifle for the drill team, so he made the students carve their own wooden rifles. In 1894, Canty also taught in the institute's literary department.

In the early summer of 1898, the institute's principal John H. Hill resigned to accept a commission as a first lieutenant in the United States Volunteers. Following Hill's resignation, the institute's Board of Regents named Canty as the acting principal. While acting principal, Canty established the institute's first military training corps for students, which emphasized physical fitness and sports as major parts of its program. Following the onset of the Spanish–American War, the state appropriated funds for uniforms and Krag–Jørgensen rifles for the training corps. The training corps later became the school's Reserve Officers' Training Corps (ROTC) unit. Canty served as acting principal until the board's selection of James McHenry Jones as principal on September 21, 1898.

Canty's department of mechanical industries was located in the institute's Machinery Hall. It was expanded in 1903 and rededicated in 1904 as the A. B. White Trades Building, named for West Virginia Governor Albert B. White. The trades building expansion cost $35,000 to complete. Canty planned and supervised the building's construction.

By 1905, Canty's work at the institute consisted of superintending the school's mechanical industries and teaching mechanical drawing. Canty was one of three instructors when he arrived at the institute in 1893 and the school had 30 students, and by 1905, the institute had grown to 18 teachers and 187 students. In that time, Canty's department had grown to include instruction in: blacksmithing, carpentry, masonry, mechanical drawing, plastering, printing, and wheelwrighting. Canty was the only instructor in the mechanical industries department when he arrived in 1893; by 1906, his department had ten employees, seven of whom were under his supervision. Canty was credited with building up the institute's mechanical industries program.

In 1907, Canty organized and helped set up the West Virginia Colored Institute's industrial and student display and the West Virginia exhibit at the Jamestown Exposition in Norfolk, Virginia. Canty resigned as superintendent of mechanical industries at West Virginia Colored Institute in 1914. Albert C. Spurlock succeeded him in this position. Canty continued to serve on the institute's faculty until his retirement in 1948. That year, Canty arranged for the construction of West Virginia State College's military training corps rifle range.

== Business pursuits ==
Canty served as the first vice president and a director of the Mutual Savings and Loan Company in Charleston—the city's African-American bank established on July 10, 1918. Canty and his fellow co-founders had organized Mutual Savings and Loan to serve the banking needs and provide home loans for Charleston's African-American community. At the company's first annual stockholders' meeting in January 1919, Canty was elected first vice president.

As an officer and director of Mutual Savings and Loan, Canty co-founded two companies to develop trading routes and relationships with Haiti, Africa, and British Guiana in 1922: the Overseas Navigation Corporation and the Overseas Trading Company. Canty served as the treasurer for both companies. The headquarters of both companies were located at 80 Wall Street in New York's Financial District. Canty was joined in these ventures by Charles E. Mitchell (president of Mutual Savings and Loan), Anthony Crawford, and Beresford Gale, among others. The Overseas Trading Company purchased its first ship from the United States Shipping Board and renamed it Anna May. The business for both companies was transacted through and underwritten by African-American banks.

== Personal life ==
=== Marriage and family ===
Canty married his first wife and former Tuskegee classmate and graduate, Sarah J. Harris, in 1891. She died at the Institute on August 20, 1894, at the age of 26. Canty credited her with his conversion to Christianity while a student at Tuskegee. Canty and Harris had three children together, including their daughter Portia. Canty's father died in the autumn of 1895, after which, Canty continued to care for his mother who remained in Marietta.

On March 3, 1897, in Harpers Ferry, West Virginia, Canty married Florence Lovett. She was born on April 11, 1866, in Winchester, Virginia, and was a graduate of Storer College in Harpers Ferry. Canty and Lovett had five children together. Lovett died on October 20, 1963, at St. Francis Hospital in Charleston, four months before Canty's death in 1964.

=== Residences ===
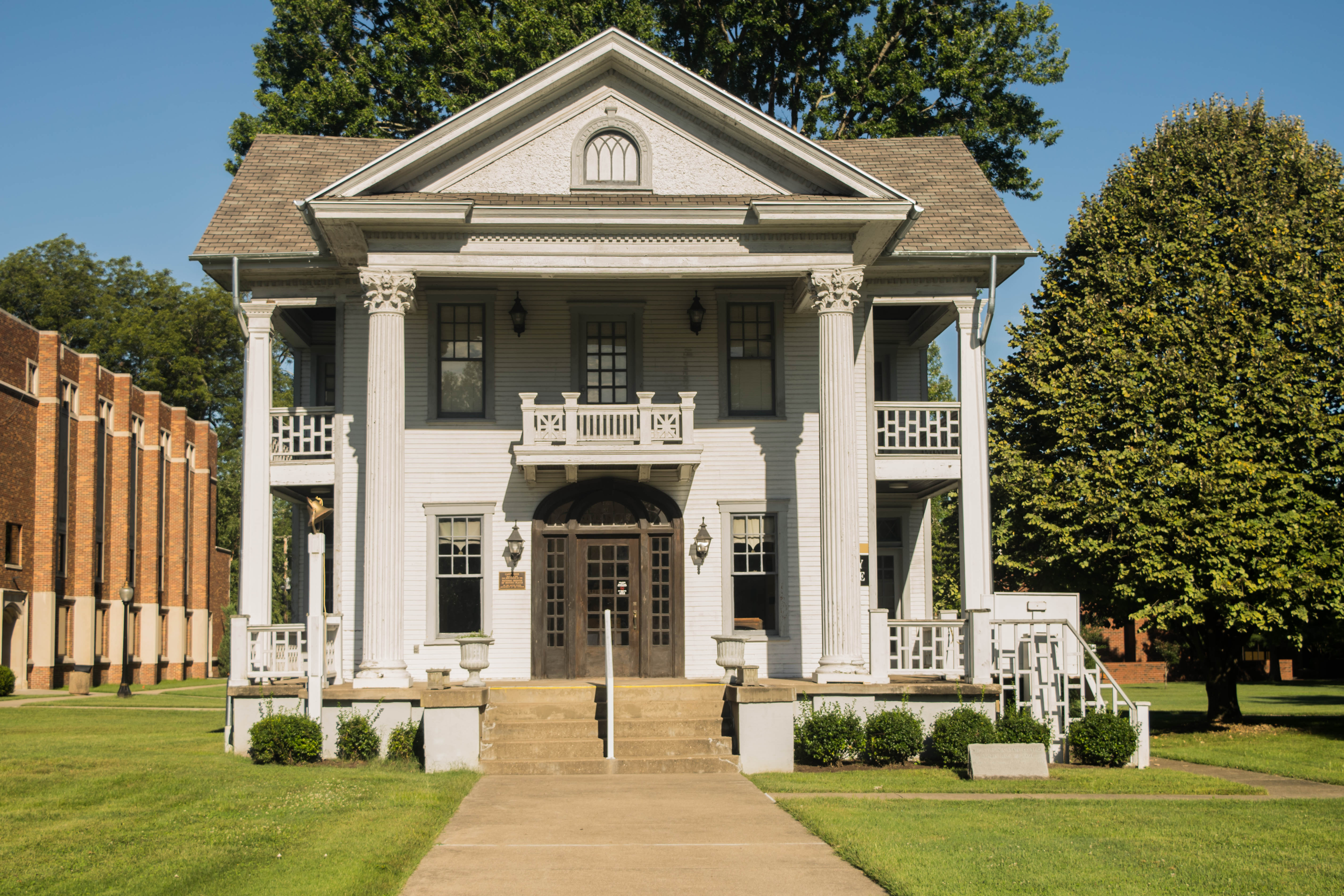
Canty House

By 1905, Canty owned a farm consisting of 100 acres (40 ha) nearly adjacent to the institute's campus. His home in Institute, known variously as the Canty House or "The Magnolia", was built originally around 1900 and renovated in 1923 by Canty and his wife Florence into the current neoclassical structure. Following Canty's death in 1964, the house was purchased by West Virginia State College and became the only example of Neoclassical architecture on its campus. The house has been relocated three times and served as an office building and the campus health clinic before becoming the site of the West Virginia State University Athletic Hall of Fame. The Canty House was listed on the National Register of Historic Places on September 23, 1988.

=== Personal interests ===
Canty was a Congregationalist as a Sunday school superintendent and teacher at his church. He was also active in civic affairs, and served as an officer in the Institute Community Club and was a member and officer of El Cubo Club, a community civic organization in Institute.

== Later life and death ==
In 1945, Canty participated as a fundraising captain in Institute in a fundraising initiative to raise $30,000 for the construction of a permanent YMCA in Charleston. In May 1950, Canty's former department, then known as the Trade and Technical Division of West Virginia State College, held a banquet in honor of Canty and other emeritus instructors of mechanical industries. In September 1950, West Virginia State's ROTC unit honored Canty in a special ceremony for his involvement with the college's military training corps program. He had cataract surgery at Shepherd Hospital in Charleston in August 1961. Following an extended illness, Canty died at his residence in Institute on February 16, 1964, of lobar pneumonia after developing prostate cancer. He was survived by three of his daughters: Portia C. Dansby, Marcia C. Hammonds, and Grace C. Mitchell—and six grandchildren.

== Bibliography ==
- Alexander, Charles (May 1906). "Tuskegee Graduates and Their Achievements". Alexander's Magazine. 2 (1). Boston: Charles Alexander: 94–103. hdl:2027/inu.30000117863757. Archived from the original on September 18, 2020 – via HathiTrust.
- Bickley, Ancella Radford (May 1988). National Register of Historic Places Inventory – Nomination Form: Canty House (PDF). United States Department of the Interior, National Park Service. Archived (PDF) from the original on March 3, 2016 – via West Virginia Archives and History.
- Canty, James M. (1905). "The Story of a Supervisor of Mechanical Industries". Tuskegee and Its People: Their Ideals and Achievements. New York: D. Appleton & Company: 299–316. OCLC 776626949 – via Internet Archive.
- Jones, James McHenry (1904). "The West Virginia Colored Institute". History of Education in West Virginia. Charleston, West Virginia: The Tribune Printing Company: 285–290. LCCN 05015334. OCLC 578625700. Archived from the original on November 11, 2016 – via Internet Archive.
- Prillerman, Byrd, ed. (October 1914). "Our New Teachers" (PDF). The Institute Monthly. VII (I). Institute, West Virginia: West Virginia Colored Institute: 6 – via Drain-Jordan Library, West Virginia State University.
- Tuskegee Normal and Industrial Institute (April 28, 1906). "The Exhibits: Historical, Sociological and Educational". The Tuskegee Student. XVIII (15). Tuskegee, Alabama: Tuskegee Normal and Industrial Institute: 32–33. OCLC 990372355. Archived from the original on September 18, 2020 – via Google Books.
- West Virginia State University (2009). West Virginia State University 2009–2010 Fact Book (PDF). Institute, West Virginia: WVSU Academic Affairs, Dr. R. Charles Byers, Vice President – via Drain-Jordan Library, West Virginia State University.
