= James McHenry Jones =

American educator, school administrator, businessperson, and minister

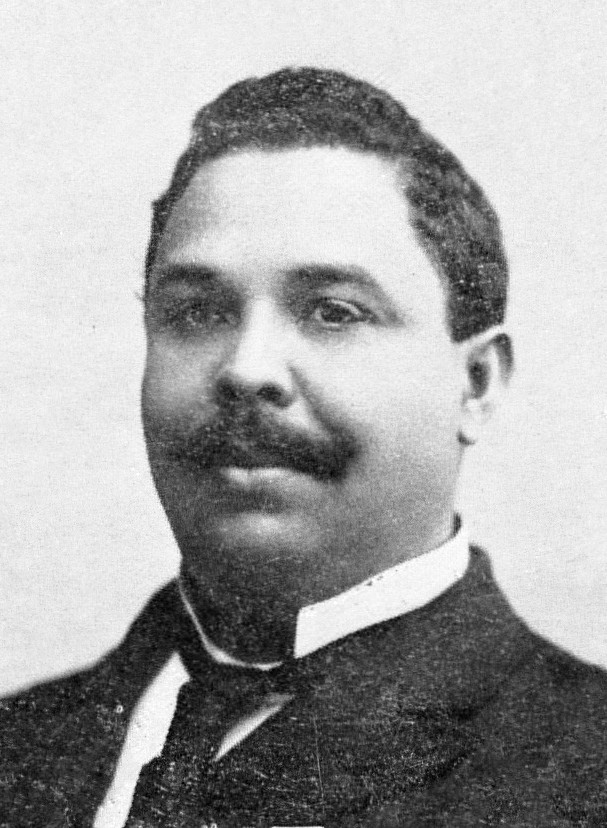
- Portrait of Jones ca. 1903

3rd President of West Virginia State University (Note: West Virginia State University was founded as the West Virginia Colored Institute in 1891, and was later known as West Virginia Collegiate Institute (1915), West Virginia State College (1929), and finally West Virginia State University (2004). Jones was titled as the institute's third principal during his tenure; however, West Virginia State University considers him the university's third president.)
- In office 1898–1909
- Preceded by: John H. Hill
- Succeeded by: Byrd Prillerman

Principal of Lincoln School
- In office 1882–1898
- Preceded by: Mrs. Gaskins
- Succeeded by: Flem B. Jones

Personal details
- Born: August 28, 1859 Gallipolis, Ohio, U.S.
- Died: September 22, 1909 (aged 50) Institute, West Virginia, U.S.
- Resting place: Cabell Cemetery, Institute
- Spouse(s): Carrie M. Harrison; Elizabeth Moore
- Profession: Educator, school administrator, businessperson, and minister

James McHenry Jones (August 28, 1859 – September 22, 1909) was an American educator, school administrator, businessperson, and minister. Jones was the third principal of the West Virginia Colored Institute (present-day West Virginia State University) from 1898 until 1909 and is considered by West Virginia State as the institution's third president.

Jones was born in 1859 in Gallipolis, Ohio, and raised in Burlington and New Richmond, before his family settled in Pomeroy along the Ohio River. There, he attended Kerr's Run Colored School and the all-white Pomeroy High School, where he graduated with honors in 1882. At 17, he joined the Free Will Baptist church, and was ordained a minister to churches in Pomeroy and Middleport, Ohio. While ministering to his two churches, Jones began his career in education as a schoolteacher outside Pomeroy. In 1882, he was elected principal of the Lincoln School in Wheeling, West Virginia. Lincoln School was the first African-American public school in the United States, established in 1866 following the American Civil War. During his 16-year tenure as principal there, he raised the school to high school standards, and it became one of West Virginia's top African-American public schools. Jones doubled the size of the faculty and the student body, expanded the school's curriculum, and rebuilt the school after a fire in 1893.

Jones was elected principal of the West Virginia Colored Institute in Institute, West Virginia, in 1898. He increased federal and state funding to the institute, and expanded the campus through the construction of classroom, dormitory, and industrial mechanics buildings. He also broadened the institute's curriculum to include teacher and military training programs. While serving as principal, Jones was an incorporator and director of the Wilgera Oil and Gas Company, which was likely one of the first African American-owned fossil fuel companies in the United States. He also served as the Grand Master of the Grand United Order of Odd Fellows in America. Jones died in 1909, and Byrd Prillerman succeeded him as principal of the institute. Jones Hall, which houses West Virginia State's University Printing Services and the National Center for Human Relations, was named by the university in his honor.

== Early life and education ==
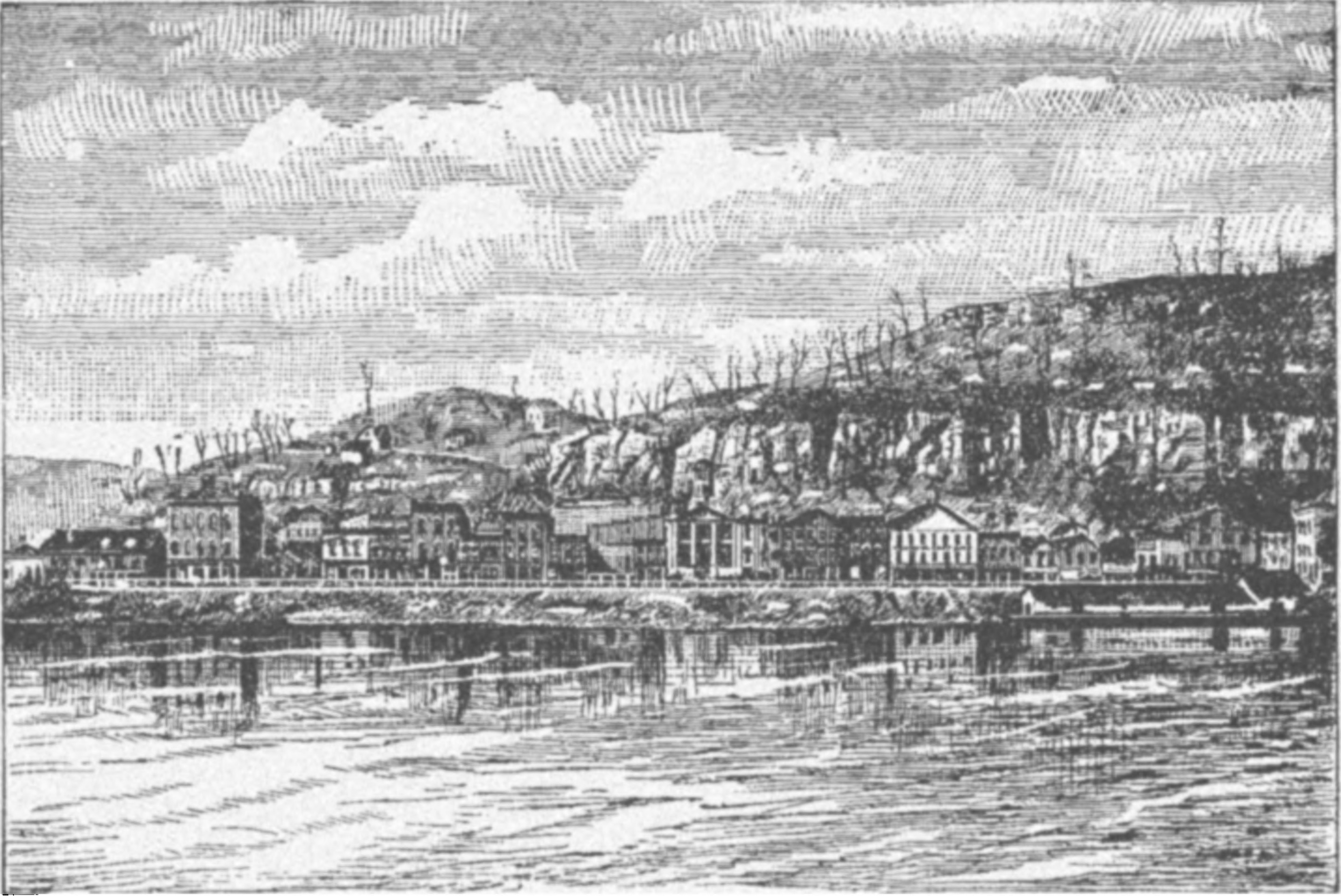
19th-century illustration of Pomeroy, Ohio, from the Ohio River

Jones was born on August 28, 1859, in Gallipolis, Ohio, the son of Joseph Jones and Temperance Reed Jones. He was the sixth of ten children, nine of whom were boys. Jones's parents, inspired by Baptist preacher Thomas Jefferson Ferguson, aspired to be middle class and emphasized the importance of education to their children. Jones was raised in Burlington and New Richmond, before his family settled in Pomeroy, Ohio, along the Ohio River. He also spent time on his grandmother's farm in Lawrence County, Ohio. As a child, Jones learned the trade of a cooper and worked in this profession before and after school.

Jones attended Kerr's Run Colored School in the Kerr's Run area of Pomeroy's First Ward. West Virginia state auditor J. S. Darst cited Jones as a person who rose to prominence, despite his early unfavorable environment—the "tough", "bloody First" Ward of Pomeroy. Darst was a childhood playmate of both Jones and educational administrator James Edwin Campbell. At 16, Jones became a schoolteacher and taught two terms in the district schools of Meigs County, Ohio. He then received permission to attend the all-white Pomeroy High School, where he studied for four years, and, in 1882, graduated first in his class out of seven students with honors. Jones was the first African American to graduate from the school. At 17, he joined the Free Will Baptist church, and despite his young age, he was ordained a minister to churches in Pomeroy and Middleport, Ohio, because of his "special fitness".

== Career in education ==
=== Lincoln School ===
Before his graduation from Pomeroy High School, Jones was elected as the principal of Lincoln School in Wheeling, West Virginia, on April 6, 1882. He competed successfully for this position against six other applicants. Founded in 1866 following the American Civil War, Lincoln School was the first African-American public school in the United States. Jones began his term as principal in June 1882. Because of the school's growth during his first year of leadership, Jones hired an additional teacher in 1883, his future wife Carrie M. Harrison. Jones had the school's building remodeled during the summer of 1884, and had two rooms added to it.

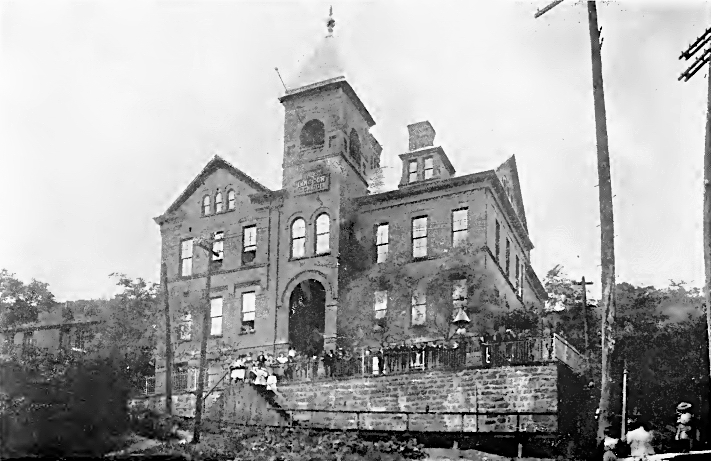
Lincoln School in Wheeling, West Virginia

In 1885, during Jones's tenure as principal, Lincoln School participated in the Wheeling City Public Schools' graduation ceremony for the first time. There Lincoln School's graduating class received their diplomas at the same time and on the same stage as white students from other city schools. According to The Cleveland Gazette, this commencement was the first integrated graduation south of the Mason–Dixon line. West Virginia Attorney General Alfred Caldwell Jr. decided that it was illegal for African-American and white children to attend the same school or be classified together, which led to racially segregated commencement ceremonies in 1886. In 1889, Jones made a further addition to the Lincoln School building, and another teacher was elected to the school's faculty.

Fire destroyed the Lincoln School building in January 1893, and Jones operated the school from a market hall while he led the rebuilding of a new school facility. The new building was completed and opened in April 1894. His successor as principal, Flem B. Jones, described the new school building as a "monument" to Jones's "untiring labor". Under Jones's leadership, Wheeling's board of education added a high school department at Lincoln School in the fall of 1896, which was identical to the high school course offered at the white Wheeling High School. By 1897, the total number of students in all grades numbered around 300.

During his 16-year tenure as principal at Lincoln, the school became one of the top African-American public schools in West Virginia. By the end of his tenure, Jones had doubled the size of the school's faculty and student body and had greatly expanded the school's curriculum.

=== West Virginia Colored Institute ===
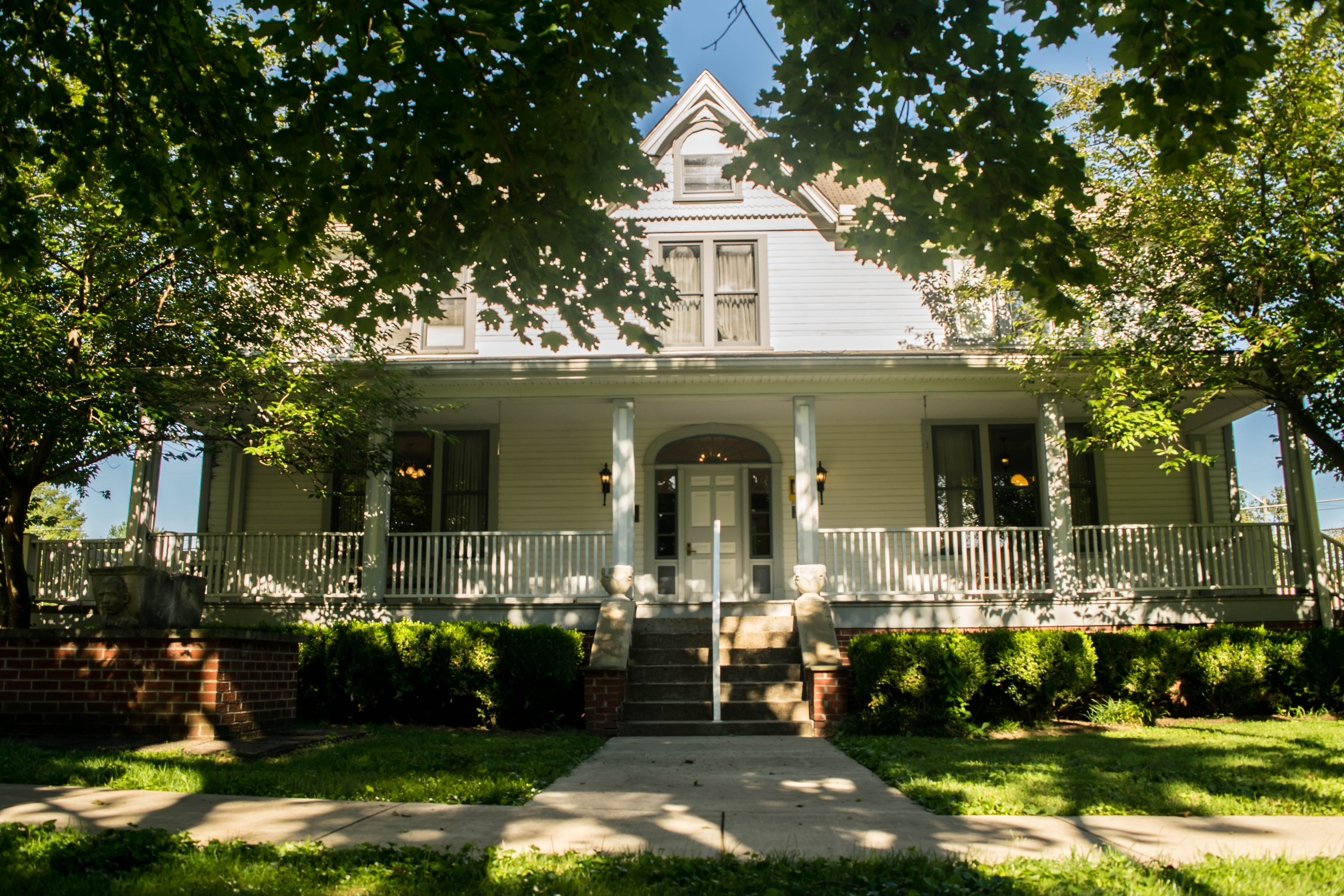
East Hall, as it appeared in 2018

The State Board of Regents elected Jones as principal of the West Virginia Colored Institute on September 21, 1898, to fill the vacancy left by the resignation of John H. Hill. The institute had been founded in 1891 under the Morrill Act of 1890 to provide West Virginia's African Americans with education in agricultural and mechanical studies. When Jones was elected principal in 1898, East Hall became his residence, and became known as the "President's House".

During Jones's tenure at the institute, he increased federal and state funding, and expanded the campus with the construction of classroom, dormitory, and industrial mechanics buildings. Jones added two new buildings to the campus, and added large additions to two existing buildings. The student body also doubled in size during his tenure. In addition, he broadened the institute's curriculum by adding a normal department and military training programs. Under his leadership, students spent half of their time receiving instruction on academic studies and the other half learning trade and vocational skills. By 1904, the institute had grown to include six departments: Normal, Agriculture, Mechanical, Domestic, Commercial, and Musical. It had a total enrollment of 185 students—its largest enrollment since its establishment. Following his death in office in 1909, a committee of the State Board of Regents elected Byrd Prillerman to succeed Jones as president of the institute.

== Political and social activities ==
Jones became an influential figure in West Virginia through his participation in African-American religious and fraternal institutions. While in Wheeling, Jones became affiliated with the Simpson Methodist Episcopal Church (later known as Simpson United Methodist Church), and worked to develop and grow the church and its community. He spoke at the church's elaborate Masonic cornerstone laying ceremony in 1893. Jones was active in the movement for African-American advancement, and became a frequently invited speaker throughout West Virginia, using this platform to deliver speeches that highlighted African-American achievements. He became well known as a speaker on Chautauqua circuits.

At 18, Jones became a member of the Grand United Order of Odd Fellows in America, an African-American fraternal order. By 1880, he represented the Ohio District Lodge at the order's convention. Jones continued to rise within the order, being elected as District Deputy Master in Springfield, in 1882; District Master in Columbus in 1883; and reelected District Master in Dayton, Ohio, in 1884. In 1888, he was elected leader of the order's District No. 24 consisting of Michigan, Ohio, and West Virginia. At the order's 1896 convention in Indianapolis, Jones was elected the order's first fraternal delegate to participate in the British Odd Fellows' annual meeting in the United Kingdom, which Jones attended in 1897. During his speech to the British Odd Fellows in 1897, Jones remarked that, "African-Americans could decrease the force of racism and acquire acceptance in the social order ... through the associations of class and especially middle-class values and morals". In 1902, Jones became the Grand Master of the Grand United Order of Odd Fellows. He served in this position for two terms, spanning four years total. Jones was also a member of the interracial Epworth League religious organization, and in 1908, the league selected him to speak at its Quadrennial Convention in Seattle, Washington. Jones was also a member of the West Virginia Teachers' Association, and participated in the association's third annual meeting in Parkersburg, West Virginia, in 1893.

Jones also became influential through his political contacts. He was a supporter of George W. Atkinson, a Wheeling attorney, newspaper editor, and Republican politician. In 1896, Jones was invited to speak at West Virginia's Republican Convention in Parkersburg. In his speech, Jones seconded Atkinson's nomination as the Republican candidate for Governor of West Virginia in 1896. Jones also founded the Atkinson Republican Club, which was an integrated organization with 100 African-American voters. He used his political influence to advocate for equal rights for African Americans and fought for equal public accommodations for African Americans to include railcars. While Jones was a supporter of the state's Republican Party, he did not run for elected public office, nor did he accept any appointments.

== Writing career ==
Jones served as an associate editor of Charleston's African-American newspaper, The Advocate. In 1896, he wrote and published a novel entitled Hearts of Gold. In it Jones details a community of African-American leaders combating racism and systemic injustice in the post-American Civil War era, and highlights their dedication to education, journalism, and fraternal organizations for African-Americans abandoned by the white political system. African-American literature scholar Robert Bone stated that Hearts of Gold reflected a growing belligerence in response to white discrimination and violence against African Americans in the 1890s, and cited his characterization of this repression as "the reign of poor whites". Literary scholar John G. Mencke stated the novel's character, Regenia Underwood, represents a movement in African-American literature where the heroine devotes herself to the profession of teaching in the American South, rather than pursue a more comfortable life elsewhere. Hugh Gloster assessed that Hearts of Gold "presents decorous characters and probes the consequences of interbreeding in the Reconstruction period". He concluded that Hearts of Gold was noteworthy because it was the first American novel with a leading character who was the offspring of a lawful marriage between a white woman and an African-American man. By 2010, only eight known copies of Hearts of Gold had survived until the West Virginia University Press republished the novel in February of that year. Jones reportedly wrote several other novels; however, literary critics have only located Hearts of Gold.

== Business activities ==
In December 1902, Jones was an incorporator of the Wilgera Oil and Gas Company, with $50,000 in initial stock. The company's other incorporators were George A. Weaver, Wilbur F. Jones, and journalist Ralph Waldo Tyler. This company was likely one of the first African American-owned fossil fuel companies in the United States. Jones served as a director of the company.

== Honors and awards ==
In recognition of his management of West Virginia Colored Institute, Wilberforce University awarded Jones an honorary Master of Arts degree. In 1908, he received an honorary Doctor of Literature degree from Rust College in Holly Springs, Mississippi.

== Death and legacy ==
Jones died on September 22, 1909, at 11:22 p.m. in Institute. He had experienced poor health in the final year of his life and was diagnosed with Bright's disease in August 1909. Jones's body lay in state at the institute's Hazelwood Assembly Hall on September 25 and was visited by hundreds of mourners. Jones's funeral was held in Charleston, and was attended by West Virginia's governor William E. Glasscock, state auditor John S. Darst, the state superintendent of schools, and former justice of the state's Supreme Court of Appeals Henry C. McWhorter. Governor Glasscock spoke at the service and said of Jones: "Always his hands, heart, and mind were engaged in lifting up his fellow man, in making smoother the path of adversity, and throwing the light of knowledge into the dark corners of ignorance. His idea of life was to make the world better and happier." Jones was interred at Cabell Cemetery on the campus of West Virginia State.

A later memorial service for Jones was held in December 1909 at the Kanawha Light Lodge No. 1637 in Charleston. In 1911, the Lincoln School Alumni Association unveiled a white marble memorial plaque at the school in Jones's memory.

The university named West Virginia State's Jones Hall in his honor. Jones Hall was built in 1924 and originally served as the institute's elementary training school and laboratory for observation and directed teaching of elementary-level grades. Jones Hall is currently home to West Virginia State's University Printing Services, and the National Center for Human Relations, a forum for "communication, understanding, and cooperation among people, groups, and institutions with a special focus on issues of human diversity and race relations".

== Personal life ==
=== Marriage and family ===
On December 27, 1888, Jones married Carrie M. Harrison of Harmar, Marietta, Ohio. They were married until Harrison's death in 1893; the couple had no children together. Jones then married Elizabeth Moore of Cincinnati. They remained married until his death in 1909, and had no children. Both of Jones's wives had been teachers hired by him at the schools he headed.

== See also ==
- List of presidents of West Virginia State University

== Bibliography ==
- Bickley, Ancella Radford; Collins, Rodney S. (June 1988). National Register of Historic Places Inventory – Nomination Form: East Hall (PDF). United States Department of the Interior, National Park Service. Archived from the original (PDF) on March 2, 2020.
- Board of Education of the City of Wheeling, West Virginia (1899). Annual Report of the Public Schools of the City of Wheeling, W. Va. for the School Year Ending July 31st, 1899. Wheeling, West Virginia: The Wheeling News Litho. Co., by Order of the Board of Education. Archived from the original on August 9, 2020 – via Internet Archive.
- Bone, Robert A. (1958). The Negro Novel in America. New Haven, Connecticut: Yale University Press. OCLC 906046845 – via Internet Archive.
- Brooks, Charles H., ed. (1902). The Official History and Manual of the Grand United Order of Odd Fellows in America. Philadelphia: Odd Fellows' Journal Print. OCLC 5437769 – via Internet Archive.
- Dawson, William M. O., ed. (1903). Report of Secretary of State, Ex Officio Sup't Public Printing, and Sec'y Board of Public Works, for the Fiscal Years Ending Sept. 30, 1901 and Sept. 30, 1902. Charleston, West Virginia: Tribune Printing Company. Archived from the original on April 12, 2017 – via Google Books.
- Gloster, Hugh M. (1965). Negro Voices in American Fiction. New York: Russell & Russell. LCCN 65017895. OCLC 10538811 – via Internet Archive.
- Jones, James McHenry (1896). Hearts of Gold. Wheeling, West Virginia: The Wheeling Daily Intelligencer. OCLC 568728525.
- Jones, James McHenry (1904). "The West Virginia Colored Institute". History of Education in West Virginia. Charleston, West Virginia: The Tribune Printing Company: 285–290. LCCN 05015334. OCLC 578625700. Archived from the original on November 11, 2016 – via Internet Archive.
- Mencke, John G. (1979). Mulattoes and Race Mixture: American Attitudes and Images, 1865-1918. Ann Arbor, Michigan: UMI Research Press. ISBN 0835709841. OCLC 876012142 – via Internet Archive.
- Robinson, Wilhelmena S. (1968). Historical Negro Biographies. International Library of Negro Life and History. New York: Publishers Company, Inc., under the auspices of the Association for the Study of Negro Life and History. ISBN 9780877812036. LCCN 68002920. OCLC 1035607110 – via Internet Archive.
- West Virginia Collegiate Institute (1924). El Ojo (PDF). Institute, West Virginia: Alpha Zeta chapter, Alpha Phi Alpha fraternity, West Virginia Collegiate Institute. Archived from the original (PDF) on June 17, 2020 – via Drain-Jordan Library, West Virginia State University.
- West Virginia Colored Institute (December 1909). "Calmly As a Little Child Lies Down to Sleep" (PDF). The Institute Monthly. II (IX): 1. Archived (PDF) from the original on September 19, 2020 – via Drain-Jordan Library, West Virginia State University.
- Wheeling Heritage (2019). Wheeling's Historic Churches: A walking tour of their history and architecture (PDF). Wheeling, West Virginia: Wheeling Heritage. Archived (PDF) from the original on September 26, 2020.
- Woodson, C. G. (January 1922). Woodson, Carter G. (ed.). "Early Negro Education in West Virginia". The Journal of Negro History. 7 (1). Washington, D.C.: Association for the Study of Negro Life and History: 23–63. doi:10.2307/2713579. hdl:2027/osu.32435074353632. JSTOR 2713579. S2CID 149565330 – via Internet Archive.
