= List of presidents of West Virginia State University =

President of West Virginia State University
- Incumbent; Ericke S. Cage since 2022
- Appointer: West Virginia State University Board of Governors
- Formation: 1891
- First holder: James Edwin Campbell (1892 - 1894)
- Website: Office of the President

This list of presidents and principals of West Virginia State University includes all who have served as president of West Virginia State University.

== Presidents ==
No.	Image	President	Term start	Term end	Ref.
Principals of the West Virginia Colored Institute (1891–1915)
1		James Edwin Campbell	1892	1894	
2		John H. Hill	1894	1898	
3		James McHenry Jones	1898	1909	
Principals of the West Virginia Collegiate Institute (1915–1929)
4		Byrd Prillerman	1909	1919	
Presidents of the West Virginia State College (1929–2004)
5		John W. Davis	1919	1953	
6		William J.L. Wallace	1953	1973	
7		Harold M. McNeill	1973	1981	
8		Thomas W. Cole Jr.	1982	1986	
acting		James Russell Jr.	1986	1987	
Presidents of the West Virginia State University (2004–present)
9		Hazo W. Carter Jr.	1987	June 30, 2012	
10		Brian Hemphill	July 1, 2012	June 30, 2016 (Note: Resigned to head Radford University.)	
11		Anthony L. Jenkins	July 1, 2016	May 15, 2020 (Note: Resigned to head Coppin State University.)	
acting		R. Charles Byers	May 16, 2020	August 31, 2020	
12		Nicole Pride	September 1, 2020	July 30, 2021 (Note: Forced to resign by the Board of Governors.)	
acting		Ericke S. Cage	July 30, 2021	September 23, 2021	
interim		Ericke S. Cage	September 23, 2021	March 31, 2022	
13		Ericke S. Cage	March 31, 2022	Present	

Table notes:
