= John H. Hill =

African-American school administrator (1852–1936)

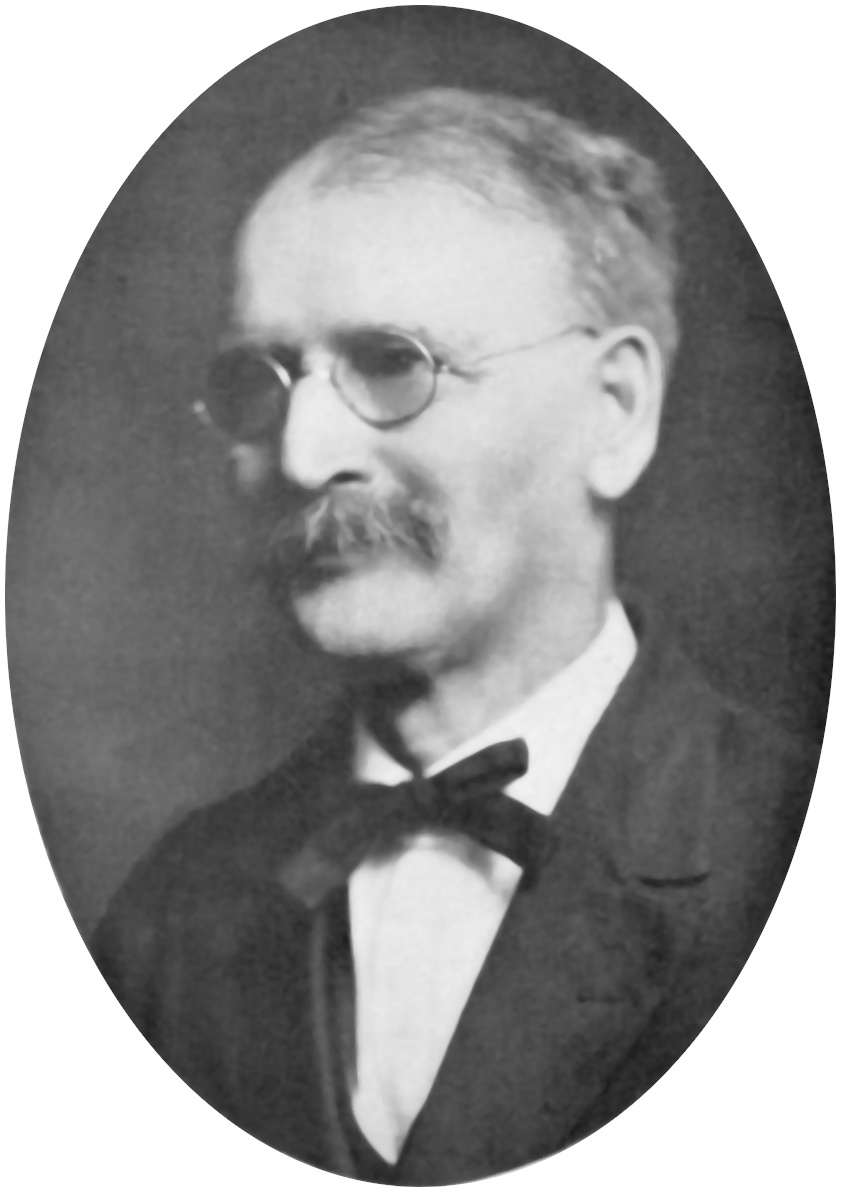
- Portrait of Hill from the El Ojo yearbook (1923)

2nd President of West Virginia State University
- In office 1894–1898
- Preceded by: James Edwin Campbell
- Succeeded by: James McHenry Jones

Personal details
- Born: July 4, 1852 Charles Town, Virginia, U.S. (Note: At the time of Hill's birth in 1852, Charles Town and Jefferson County were a part of the Commonwealth of Virginia, and they later became a part of West Virginia in 1863.)
- Died: October 13, 1936 (aged 84) Institute, West Virginia, U.S.
- Resting place: Institute Cemetery
- Spouse: Etta Lovett Hill
- Profession: Lawyer, educator, school administrator, and military officer

Military service
- Allegiance: United States
- Branch/service: U.S. Army (1882–1887); U.S. Volunteers (1898–1899)
- Years of service: 1882–1887 (U.S.A.); 1898–1899 (U.S.V.)
- Rank: Quartermaster Sergeant (U.S.A.); First Lieutenant (U.S.V.)
- Unit: 10th Cavalry Regiment (U.S.A.); 8th Infantry Volunteer Immunes (U.S.V.)
- Battles/wars: Apache Wars

John Henry Hill (July 4, 1852 – October 13, 1936) was an African-American lawyer, educator, school administrator, and military officer. He was the second principal of the West Virginia Colored Institute (present-day West Virginia State University) from 1894 until 1898. West Virginia State considers him its second president. (Note: West Virginia State University was founded as the West Virginia Colored Institute in 1891, and was later known as West Virginia Collegiate Institute (1915), West Virginia State College (1929), and finally West Virginia State University (2004). Hill was titled as a principal during his tenure; however, West Virginia State University considers him the university's second president.)

Hill was born into slavery in 1852 in Charles Town, Virginia, (present-day West Virginia). During the American Civil War, he relocated to Maine where he studied law. He became Maine's second African-American lawyer in 1879, and became West Virginia's first African-American lawyer after his admission to the bar of Jefferson County's circuit court in 1881. Hill then served in the 10th Cavalry Regiment for six years, during which time he participated in the Apache Wars. He was a schoolteacher and then principal at Shepherdstown's African-American public school, Shadyside School, from 1889 until 1893, and then served as the second principal of the West Virginia Colored Institute from 1894 until 1898. Hill resigned as principal to serve in the United States Volunteers during the Spanish–American War from 1898 to 1899. Hill returned to the institute in 1899, when he was appointed Commandant of Cadets and professor of mathematics, and remained there until 1903. Following his death in 1936, West Virginia State named Hill Hall in his honor.

== Early life and education ==
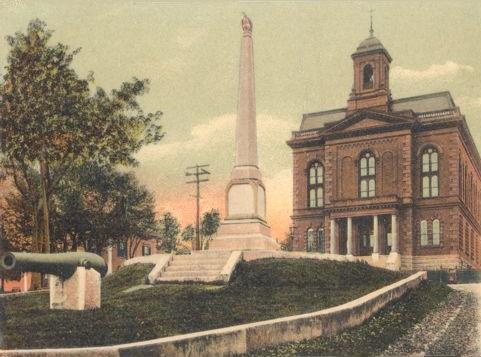
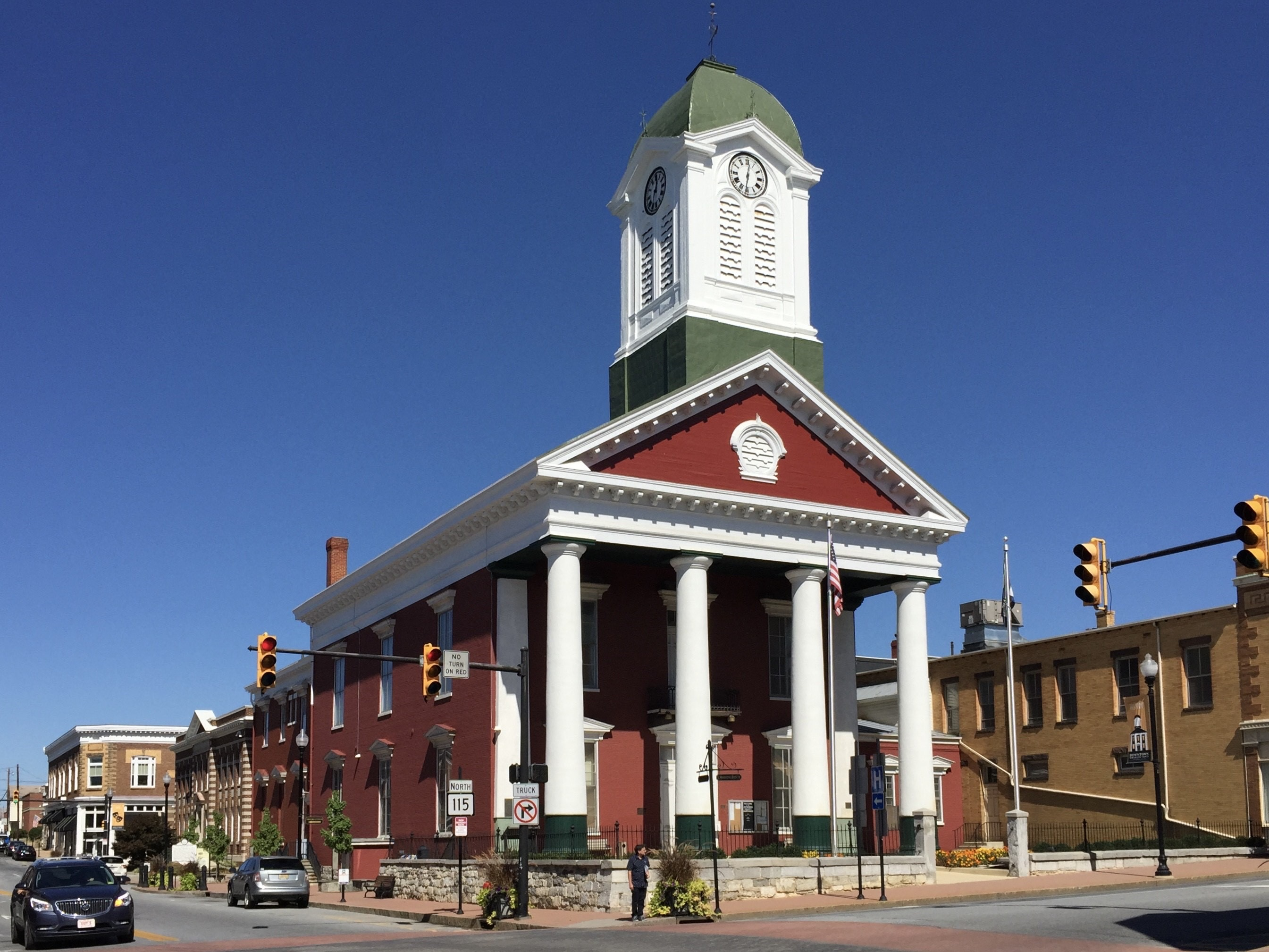
Hill was admitted to the bar in Sagadahoc County, Maine and Jefferson County, West Virginia (courthouses pictured)

John Henry Hill was born on July 4, 1852, in Charles Town, Virginia, (present-day West Virginia). Hill was born into slavery, under the ownership of the William Alexander family. William Alexander was later named as Hill's natural father. Hill was also a descendant of slaves who had served in George Washington's household. Towards the end of the American Civil War, Hill ran away from his home and was then captured by Union soldiers. At the age of thirteen, Major J. H. Whitmore of the 15th Maine Volunteer Infantry Regiment took him to Maine. Major Whitmore's father, Samuel Whitmore, then took him in and provided him with a fundamental education. While in Maine, Hill studied Latin and attended Litchfield Academy in Litchfield, Maine. Hill later attended Bowdoin College, although he did not finish his coursework there.

== Legal and military careers ==
Hill taught in schools to pay for his study expenses, and from 1877 to 1879, he worked at the law office of Tallman and Larrabee while he studied law. On April 11, 1879, Judge Charles J. Faulkner Jr. qualified Hill to practice law at the bar of the Supreme Judicial Court of Sagadahoc County, Maine. Hill became Maine's second African-American lawyer after Macon Bolling Allen. Hill returned to his native Jefferson County, West Virginia, to serve its African-American community. In 1881, Hill became the first African American to be admitted to the bar of the Jefferson County Circuit Court. He became West Virginia's first African-American lawyer. While in Jefferson County, Hill also served as an assistant instructor on the board of teachers for Storer College in Harpers Ferry, West Virginia, in 1881.

Hill practiced law in Jefferson County until 1882, when he enlisted in the 10th Cavalry Regiment of the United States Army. He was formally enlisted at Cincinnati, Ohio, on October 23, 1882. Hill served in the 10th Cavalry Regiment for six years, during which time he participated in the campaign against Geronimo in the Apache Wars. He was honorably discharged with the military rank of regimental quartermaster sergeant.

== Educational career ==
=== Schoolteacher and principal ===
Following his discharge from military service, Hill returned to Charles Town, and became a schoolteacher in Shepherdstown, West Virginia. African-American historian Carter G. Woodson wrote that Hill was the "most prominent teacher that Shepherdstown had" and that the community remembered him for the efficiency of his work. Hill served as the principal of Shepherdstown's African-American public school known as Shadyside School. Shadyside School, Shepherdstown's second school for African Americans, had replaced the town's Old School—the town's first public school for African Americans—in 1883. As principal, Hill commenced the 1889 school year with 63 students, and the 1890 school year with a record 65 students. The school's board of trustees reappointed him to this position in 1891. Hill sought to add grade levels to Shadyside School and worked to standardize instruction there. He served as the school's principal until 1893, when Alexander Freeman succeeded him in this position. While in Shepherdstown, Hill was a proponent of the temperance movement, and in May 1890, he delivered an address to a temperance meeting at Shepherdstown's African Methodist Episcopal Church.

=== West Virginia Colored Institute ===
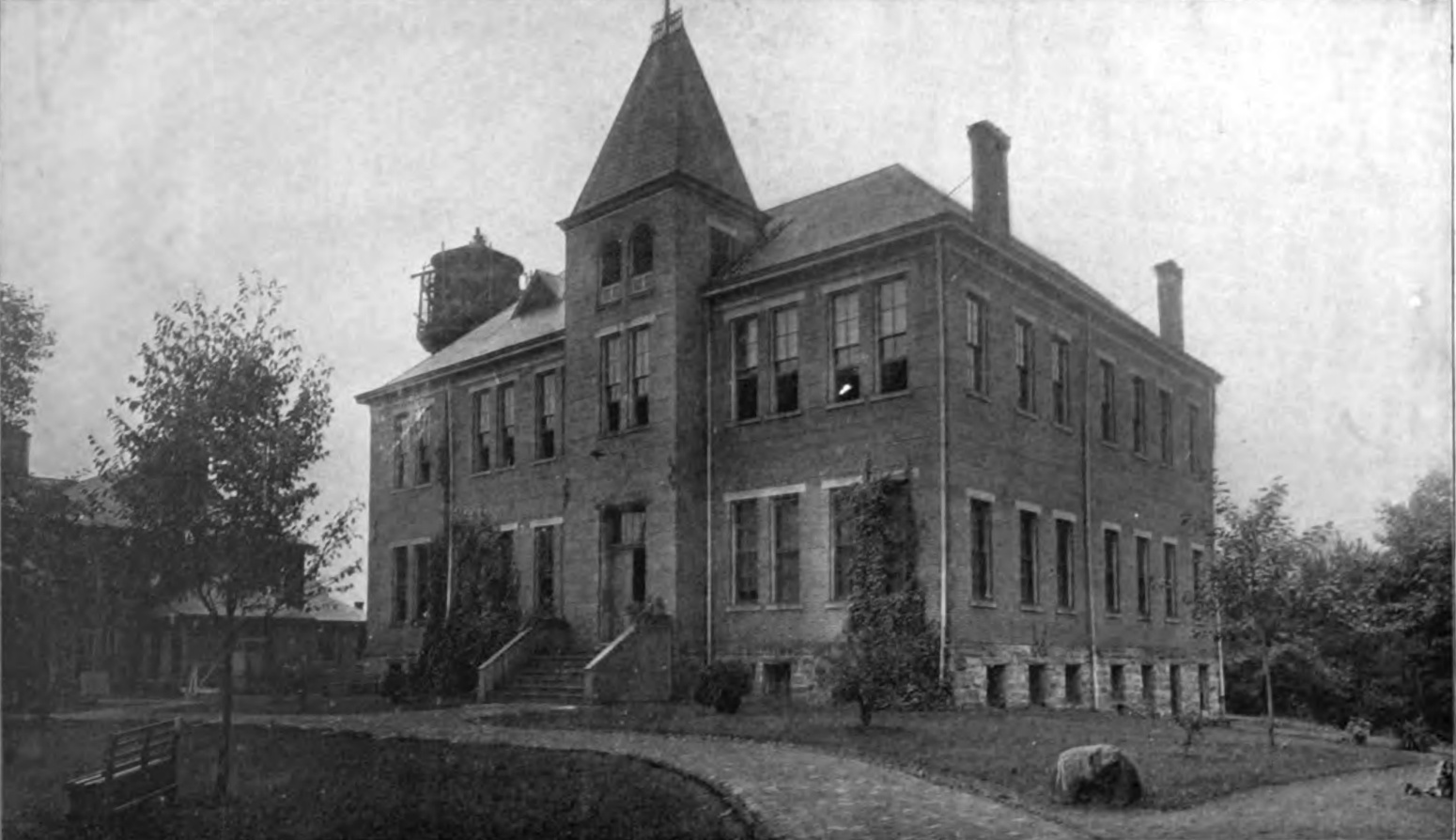
Fleming Hall at West Virginia Colored Institute (1910)

In 1893, Hill was appointed as the English professor and assistant principal of the West Virginia Colored Institute in Farm, West Virginia, (present-day Institute). A. S. Dandridge, Jefferson County's representative to the West Virginia Legislature, championed Hill's appointment to the institute. The institute had been founded in 1891 under the Morrill Act of 1890, to provide West Virginia's African Americans with education in agricultural and mechanical studies.

Following the resignation of the institute's principal James Edwin Campbell in 1894, the president of the Board of Regents appointed Hill to finish Campbell's unexpired term. In June 1894, at the regular meeting of the board, Hill was elected and duly installed as the second principal of the West Virginia Colored Institute. Hill presided over the institute's first commencement. By May 1898, the faculty under Hill consisted of C. E. Jones teaching natural science and history, Byrd Prillerman teaching English and mental science, James M. Canty teaching mechanics and mechanical drawing, Hill's wife Etta Hill teaching music, drawing, and Latin, and Flayvilla D. Brown teaching sewing. In addition to his duties as principal, Hill also taught mathematics. Throughout his tenure as principal at the institute, Hill and his wife resided in Fleming Hall.

As the institute's principal, Hill was a member of the West Virginia Teachers' Association. He participated in the association's third annual meeting in Parkersburg in 1893, and at the association's fourth annual meeting in Montgomery in 1894, Hill was appointed to a committee to urge the West Virginia Legislature to make an appropriation to the West Virginia Colored Institute's teaching fund. He attended the association's fifth meeting in Hinton in 1895 and the sixth meeting in Charleston in 1896, where he provided the welcoming remarks.

Hill resigned his position as principal in 1898 to fight in the Spanish–American War, and he was commissioned as a first lieutenant in the 8th United States Infantry Volunteer Immunes of the United States Volunteers on July 19, 1898. He was also appointed as the regimental commissary officer. In addition to Hill, six of the institute's students enlisted, four of whom were made non-commissioned officers. Hill was honorably discharged the next year on March 6, 1899. Following his resignation, the Board of Regents placed James M. Canty of the Mechanical Department in charge of the school until the board's election of James McHenry Jones in September 1898. Hill returned to the institute when he was appointed as Commandant of Cadets and professor of mathematics in June 1899. As commandant, Hill led the institute's cadets in West Virginia military parades.

In February 1900, Hill announced his candidacy for a Kanawha County seat in the West Virginia House of Delegates. Hill was the only African-American candidate for a legislative seat in West Virginia's primary elections. He narrowly lost to Shelton Johnson in the Republican primary in May 1900.

== Later life and death ==
Hill resigned from his positions at the West Virginia Colored Institute in 1903 and spent the following year traveling across the Western United States and Mexico. He then resided in Oklahoma before returning to West Virginia in 1913. During World War I, Hill served as a welfare worker in the coalfields of Southern West Virginia. Following the war, Hill worked as an assistant at the West Virginia Workmen's Department of Compensation in nearby Charleston, and he remained in this position until 1929. Declining health led to Hill resigning from this position.

Hill visited the institute (then known as West Virginia Collegiate Institute) in November 1922, and delivered a presentation on "Mexico and Its People", based upon his personal knowledge from his travels in Mexico. While Hill no longer worked directly for the institute, he continued his affiliation with the school as an occasional lecturer at student assemblies and informal advisor to students.

In 1933, Hill published Princess Malah, a historical novel about a slave on the plantation of Samuel Washington, George Washington's brother. Hill wrote Princess Malah "to depict the relationships existing between the master and slave in the period of our history just prior to the Revolutionary War". As a descendant of slaves in George Washington's household, Hill grew up listening to stories about the private lives of the Washington family. In Hill's novel, Princess Malah is the daughter of Lawrence Washington and the rightful heiress to Mount Vernon.

In 1935, West Virginia's State Board of Education honored Hill's service to West Virginia State College by naming him the college's president emeritus. In April 1936, Hill was a founding member of the West Virginia sustaining membership committee of the Association for the Study of Negro Life and History. In May 1936, as president emeritus, Hill participated in West Virginia State's Founder's Day exercises on the 44th anniversary of the college's opening.

Hill died of sepsis on October 13, 1936, at his home in Institute. His funeral services were held at West Virginia State, and he was interred at Institute Cemetery.

== Legacy ==
West Virginia State University's Hill Hall is named for Hill. Hill Hall was a dormitory for upper-class women, and was built between 1936 and 1937 and renovated in 1979. Hill Hall formerly housed West Virginia State's Counseling and Tutoring Center, Upward Bound, and Special Services. Hill Hall currently houses the university's Business Administration, Economics, English, History, Modern Foreign Language, Political Science, and Sociology Departments.

== Personal life ==
On the morning of New Year's Day in January 1889, Hill married Etta Lovett in Harpers Ferry. According to The Shepherdstown Register, the "marriage was conducted very quietly on account of the recent death" of Lovett's father. Prior to her marriage, Lovett was the organist for Storer College in Harpers Ferry.

== Bibliography ==
- Brown, Charles Summer (May 1959). "The Genesis of the Negro Lawyer in New England". Negro History Bulletin. 22 (8). Association for the Study of Negro Life and History: 171–177. JSTOR 44215547.
- Browning, James B. (January 1934). "John H. Hill, Princess Malah". The Journal of Negro History. 19 (1). Washington, D.C.: Association for the Study of Negro Life and History: 90–91. doi:10.2307/2714665. JSTOR 2714665.
- Canty, James M. (1905). "The Story of a Supervisor of Mechanical Industries". Tuskegee and Its People: Their Ideals and Achievements. New York: D. Appleton & Company: 299–316. OCLC 776626949 – via Internet Archive.
- G. B. J. (May 1935). "Reviewed Work: Princess Malah, by John H. Hill". Social Forces. 13 (4). Oxford University Press: 624. doi:10.2307/2569884. JSTOR 2569884.
- Gloster, Hugh M. (1965). Negro Voices in American Fiction. New York: Russell & Russell. ISBN 978-0-8462-0577-7. OCLC 848264633 – via Internet Archive.
- Jones, James McHenry (1904). "The West Virginia Colored Institute". History of Education in West Virginia. Charleston, West Virginia: The Tribune Printing Company: 285–290. LCCN 05015334. OCLC 578625700. Archived from the original on November 11, 2016 – via Internet Archive.
- Lewis, Virgil A. (1896). Twelfth Biennial Report of the State Superintendent of Free Schools. Charleston, West Virginia: Moses W. Donnally, Public Printer. OCLC 897706495. Archived from the original on September 18, 2020 – via Google Books.
- Moorland–Spingarn Research Center Staff (October 1, 2015). Hill, John H. Washington, D.C.: Howard University. Archived from the original on June 12, 2020.
- Smith, J. Clay Jr. (1999). Emancipation: The Making of the Black Lawyer, 1844–1944. Philadelphia: University of Pennsylvania Press. ISBN 978-0-8122-1685-1. OCLC 491962363. Archived from the original on August 13, 2020 – via Google Books.
- Storer College (1881). Biennial Catalogue of the Officers and Students of Storer College: Academic and Normal Departments Located at Harper's Ferry, West Virginia. Dover, New Hampshire: Morning Star Job Print – via Internet Archive.
- West Virginia Collegiate Institute (December 1922). "Campus News and Notes" (PDF). The Institute Monthly. XV (2): 14–18. Archived from the original (PDF) on June 11, 2020 – via Drain-Jordan Library, West Virginia State University.
- West Virginia Collegiate Institute (1923). El Ojo (PDF). Institute, West Virginia: Alpha Zeta chapter, Alpha Phi Alpha fraternity, West Virginia Collegiate Institute. Archived from the original (PDF) on June 13, 2020 – via Drain-Jordan Library, West Virginia State University.
- West Virginia Collegiate Institute (1924). El Ojo (PDF). Institute, West Virginia: Alpha Zeta chapter, Alpha Phi Alpha fraternity, West Virginia Collegiate Institute. Archived from the original (PDF) on June 17, 2020 – via Drain-Jordan Library, West Virginia State University.
- Woodson, C. G. (January 1922). Woodson, Carter G. (ed.). "Early Negro Education in West Virginia". The Journal of Negro History. 7 (1). Washington, D.C.: Association for the Study of Negro Life and History: 23–63. doi:10.2307/2713579. hdl:2027/osu.32435074353632. JSTOR 2713579. S2CID 149565330 – via Internet Archive.
- Woodson, Carter G., ed. (January 1937). "Notes". The Journal of Negro History. 22 (1). Washington, D.C.: Association for the Study of Negro Life and History: 116–140. doi:10.1086/JNHv22n1p116. JSTOR 2714327. S2CID 224835338.
