= West Virginia State University =

Historically black university in Institute, West Virginia, US

- Former names: West Virginia Colored Institute (1891–1915); West Virginia Collegiate Institute (1915–1929); West Virginia State College (1929–2004)
- Motto: Veritas Lux Mundi (Latin)
- Motto in English: "Truth is the Light of the World"
- Type: Public historically black land-grant university
- Established: 1891; 135 years ago
- Accreditation: HLC
- Academic affiliations: TMCF; WVHEPC
- Endowment: $12.6 million (2021)
- President: Ericke S. Cage
- Students: 3,458 (2023)
- Undergraduates: 2,095
- Postgraduates: 1,363
- Location: Institute, West Virginia, United States; 38°22′57″N 81°45′56″W
- Campus: 100 acres (0.40 km^{2}); Midsize suburb
- Newspaper: The Yellow Jacket
- Colors: Black and gold
- Nickname: Yellow Jackets
- Sporting affiliations: NCAA Division II - MEC
- Mascot: Stinger
- Website: www.wvstateu.edu

West Virginia State University (WVSU) is a public historically black, land-grant university in Institute, West Virginia, United States. Founded in 1891 as the West Virginia Colored Institute. It is one of the original 19 land-grant colleges and universities established by the second Morrill Act of 1890, which evolved as a diverse and inclusive campus. Following desegregation, WVSU's student population slowly became more white than black. As of 2017, WVSU's student body was 75% white and only 8% African-American.

The university's Gus R. Douglass Land-Grant Institute is divided into three programmatic divisions: WVSU Extension Service, WVSU Agricultural and Environmental Research Station, and The Center for the Advancement of Science, Technology, Engineering and Mathematics (CASTEM). The WVSU Extension Service (1890 Extension) provides community and agricultural outreach throughout West Virginia via 4-H Youth Development, Agriculture and Natural Resources, Community and Economic Development, and Family and Consumer Sciences programs. The WVSU Agricultural and Environmental Research Station (1890 Research) focuses on Aquaculture, Environmental Microbiology & Biotechnology, Horticultural Crops & Production Systems, Urban Forestry & Natural Resource Management, and Vegetable Genomics & Plant Breeding research programs. CASTEM programs encourage the state's youth to pursue careers in Science, Technology, Engineering and Mathematics Network (STEM) fields to become engineers, scientists, researchers, teachers, and leaders.

== History ==
WVSU is located on land once occupied by mound builder Native Americans. The British government granted the site to George Washington for his service in the British military during the French and Indian War. It was subsequently sold and operated as a plantation, using enslaved labor. Prior to 1830, Samuel I. Cabell, moved to the Kanawha River valley from Georgia and married Mary Barnes, a former slave, who bore thirteen children. He bought the property in 1853 and much to the displeasure of their white neighbors, took elaborate precautions to ensure that Mary, his wife, and their children would inherit his wealth and not be sold into slavery, including officially emancipating Mary and their then-living children in 1858. Sam Cabell was murdered shortly after the American Civil War and the creation of the state of West Virginia. Two decades later, his daughter Maria Cabell-Hurt sold some land to the new state to permit creation of the West Virginia Colored Institute, since Sam's descendants and neighbors had to send their children across the Ohio River to Ohio for higher education. Sam and Mary Cabell and their children are buried on the campus; some descendants continue to live nearby.

=== Early history ===
The school was established as the West Virginia Colored Institute in 1891 under the second Morrill Act, which provided for land-grant institutions for Black students in the 17 states that had segregated schools. The school opened its doors in May 1892 and had an enrollment of over 40 students. The faculty consisted of President James Edwin Campbell, Byrd Prillerman, and T.C. Friend. The curriculum consisted of courses in agriculture, horticulture, mechanical arts, and domestic science. Teacher education ("normal") courses were added in 1893. Military education became an integral part of the school, and in 1899 West Virginia's legislature passed a bill to admit up to 60 cadets. In 1909, African-American educator and statesman Booker T. Washington recommended his friend, Byrd Prillerman, as the institution's president. Washington had been instrumental in locating the institution in the Kanawha Valley, visited the campus often, and spoke at its first commencement. During Prillerman's 10-year administration, the school established itself as the center of black intellectual life in the state.

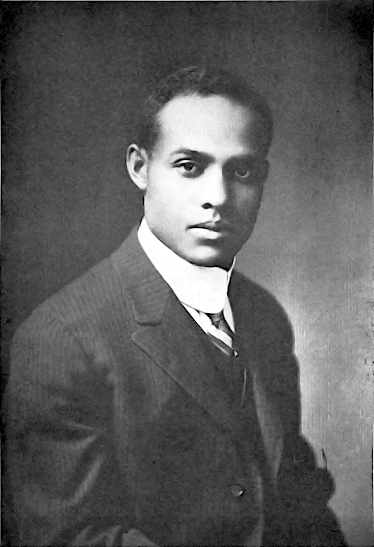
John Warren Davis, fifth president

From 1891 through 1915, the school provided the equivalent of a high school education, with vocational training and teacher preparation for segregated public schools. In 1915, it became the West Virginia Collegiate Institute and began to offer college degrees. In 1919, John Warren Davis became president of the institute. A Morehouse graduate, Davis recruited highly qualified faculty and focused on curriculum development. He persuaded noted historian Carter G. Woodson to assist him as academic dean. In 1927, the school was accredited by the North Central Association of Colleges and Schools, making it the first of 17 original black land-grant schools to be certified by a regional association and one of only four black colleges to gain such status. It also became the first public college in West Virginia to be accredited by North Central. In 1929, the name was changed to West Virginia State College. With an enrollment of 1,000 students, the college contained divisions of Applied Arts and Sciences; Languages, Literature and Fine Arts; Natural Sciences and Mathematics; and Social Sciences and Philosophy.

In 1939, West Virginia State College became the first of six historically black colleges to be authorized by the Civil Aeronautics Authority to establish an aviation program. Benefiting from the presence of the Wertz Field airport adjacent to campus, the program prepared many African-American pilots for the U.S. Army Air Corps in World War II. Several college aviators joined the famed 99th Fighter Squadron and 332nd Fighter Group (the Tuskegee Airmen) that served with distinction in the European Theater. One of the original graduates of the aviation program, Rose Agnes Rolls Cousins, was the first African-American woman to become a solo pilot in the Civilian Pilot Training Program. During World War II, West Virginia State College was one of 131 colleges and universities nationally that took part in the V-12 Navy College Training Program, which offered students a path to a Navy commission. In 1942, a college ROTC program was established as an artillery unit. The ROTC tradition continues today, and the school has claimed 15 general officers who have graduated from West Virginia State, including Major General Charles C. Rogers and Major General Harvey D. Williams. In 1951 the Drain-Jordan Library opened, named in honor of librarian Leaonead Pack Drain-Bailey and Lawrence Victor Jordan.

=== Desegregation ===
West Virginia State College underwent a significant transformation under the guidance of President William J. L. Wallace. In 1954, following the Brown v. Board of Education order to desegregate public education, and the initiation of the G.I. Bill, the college transformed into a predominantly White institution. This garnered national attention. President Wallace hailed it as "a tribute to the character and courage of the people of Kanawha Valley." As a result, West Virginia State adopted the motto "A Living Laboratory of Human Relations." Enrollment substantially increased after the change in demographics.

In 1957, the school lost its land grant status because the West Virginia Board of Education voted to end the state funding needed to obtain matching federal land-grant aid. Although land-grant university funding is governed by federal laws, the federal aid is conditioned upon matching state funds. Under the leadership of President Hazo W. Carter, Jr., a 12-year quest was begun to restore the land-grant designation. The first step toward regaining the status came when Gov. Gaston Caperton signed a bill on Feb. 12, 1991, that had been passed by the Legislature to recognize the land-grant status on the state level. With the advocacy of alumni, university leadership, and assistance from West Virginia's U.S. Senator Robert C. Byrd, the U.S. Congress fully restored land-grant status in 2001. West Virginia State is again recognized as an 1890 land-grant institution with recognition at the Federal level, along with funding to carry out its mission of teaching, research, and public service. The land-grant institution of WVSU is named the Gus R. Douglass Land-Grant Institution.

=== University status ===
In 2003, the school's community college, established in 1953, was separately accredited as the West Virginia State Community and Technical College but remained administratively linked to West Virginia State College. In 2008, the legislature fully separated the community and technical college. However, both schools continued to share the same campus. In 2009, the Community and Technical College went through a name change and it was announced on April 20, 2009, as Kanawha Valley Community and Technical College. In the fall of 2012, KVCTC moved its campus to South Charleston, West Virginia.

In 2004, under President Carter's leadership, West Virginia State College gained University status, becoming West Virginia State University, and began to offer graduate degrees in Biotechnology and Media Studies. In the fall of 2011, WVSU began to offer a graduate degree in Law Enforcement. In the spring of 2014, WVSU began offering a graduate degree in education. Under President Brian O. Hemphill, the university set a goal to become the most student-centered research and teaching, land-grant university in West Virginia. Under President Anthony L. Jenkins, PhD, the university celebrated a historic achievement, receiving its full land-grant state match.

=== Leadership ===
After serving as interim president, Ericke S. Cage is the current and 13th president of the university, officially taking office in 2022. Past presidents of the university include: James Edwin Campbell (1892–94), John H. Hill (1894–98), James McHenry Jones (1898–1909), Byrd Prillerman (1909–19), John Warren Davis (1919–53), William J.L. Wallace (1953–73), Harold M. McNeill (1973–81), Thomas W. Cole, Jr. (1982–86), Hazo W. Carter, Jr. (1986–2012), Brian O'Harold Hemphill (2012–16), Anthony L. Jenkins (2016–20), and Nicole Pride (2020–21). . Several buildings on campus are named after them: Campbell Conference Center, Hill Hall, Jones Hall, Prillerman Hall, Davis Fine Arts Building, Wallace Hall, McNeill Facilities Building, Cole Complex, and the Dr. Hazo W. Carter Jr. Integrated Research and Extension Building and the adjacent Dr. Hazo W. and Judge Phyllis H. Carter Food and Agricultural Complex.

James Edwin Campbell was a poet, free-lance writer, and mathematician from Pomeroy, Ohio. Following Campbell was John H. Hill, who was a lawyer, teacher, administrator, and soldier, who oversaw the university's first commencement. He resigned to fight in the Spanish–American War and later returned as an instructor. James McHenry Jones was responsible for adding teacher education (a "normal" department), and is buried on campus. Before becoming the fourth president, Byrd Prillerman was a faculty member and one of those responsible for locating the school in the Kanawha Valley. During his tenure, academic programs were expanded and the institution was renamed the "West Virginia Collegiate Institute". John Warren Davis focused on recruiting the best black faculty members he could find and developing the curriculum. He persuaded noted historian Carter G. Woodson to assist him as Academic Dean. During his tenure, the school was first accredited by the North Central Association of Colleges and Schools in 1927, and became West Virginia State College in 1929. Davis is the longest-serving president, having served for thirty-four years.

William James Lord Wallace's greatest challenge of his presidency came following the U.S. Supreme Court's 1954 ruling, Brown v. Board of Education, which declared segregated schools to be unconstitutional. Following that, the historically black West Virginia State College opened its doors to all students. Dr. Wallace not only met the challenge but set an example for the world to follow. During Harold M. McNeill's tenure, the community college component was established; a building was erected for community college programs, and Ferrell Hall and the Drain-Jordan Library were renovated. During Thomas Winston Cole, Jr.'s administration, he made several organizational changes in the institution, creating new academic divisions and establishing a planning and advancement unit. Cole left West Virginia State in 1986 to become Chancellor of the West Virginia Board of Regents.

Shortly after he became the ninth president in September 1987, Dr. Hazo W. Carter, Jr. began a 12-year quest to regain the college's land-grant status that had been transferred in the 1950s. Since "State" was the only institution to have the status removed, there was no precedent for recovering it. After this status was restored, a quest then began for West Virginia State to be designated a university, which became a reality in 2004; he became the first president to serve under the "university" status. These achievements, accompanied by two highly successful accreditation's by the North Central Association of Colleges and Schools and the addition of graduate programs, highlight his administration. In August 2011, the faculty voted no confidence in Carter's leadership, and Carter retired on June 30, 2012. He then became president emeritus until his death in February 2014. Under the leadership of Dr. Anthony L. Jenkins, WVSU expanded its outreach and public service to all 55 counties throughout WV, increased academic program offerings to include Engineering and Nursing, increased retention and dual enrollment course offerings.

Just less than one year as president, Dr. Nicole Pride, the university's 12th president who was also the first female president of WVSU, resigned following controversy. Her cabinet called for her termination due to allegations of a hostile work environment under her leadership. A vote of "no confidence" was taken and the Board of Governors unanimously accepted her resignation letter.

=== Other ===
East Hall and the Canty House, home of "Colonel" James M. Canty, were listed on the National Register of Historic Places in 1988.

WVSU's Fall and Spring Commencement Ceremonies were held in December and May, respectively, at the Charleston Civic Center in Charleston. Until 2009, WVSU and WVSCTC had joint commencement ceremonies. To cut back on spending, WVSU now holds its commencement ceremonies on campus. Until the completion of the new convocation center, the December commencement was held in the P.A. Williams Auditorium of Ferrell Hall, while the May commencement was either on the large lawn in the center of campus (also called the quad), or in the P.A. Williams Auditorium, pending weather. Commencements are now held in the D. Stephen and Diane H. Walker Convocation Center (Walker Convocation Center for short), a new addition/renovation to Fleming Hall. The Spring 2014 commencement was the first commencement held in the Walker Convocation Center.

== Student life ==
Undergraduate demographics as of Fall 2023
Race and ethnicity	Total
White	56%
Unknown	18%
Black	13%
Two or more races	5%
International student	4%
Hispanic	3%
Asian	1%
Economic diversity
Low-income (Note: The percentage of students who received an income-based federal Pell grant intended for low-income students.)	48%
Affluent (Note: The percentage of students who are a part of the American middle class at the bare minimum.)	52%

=== Athletics ===
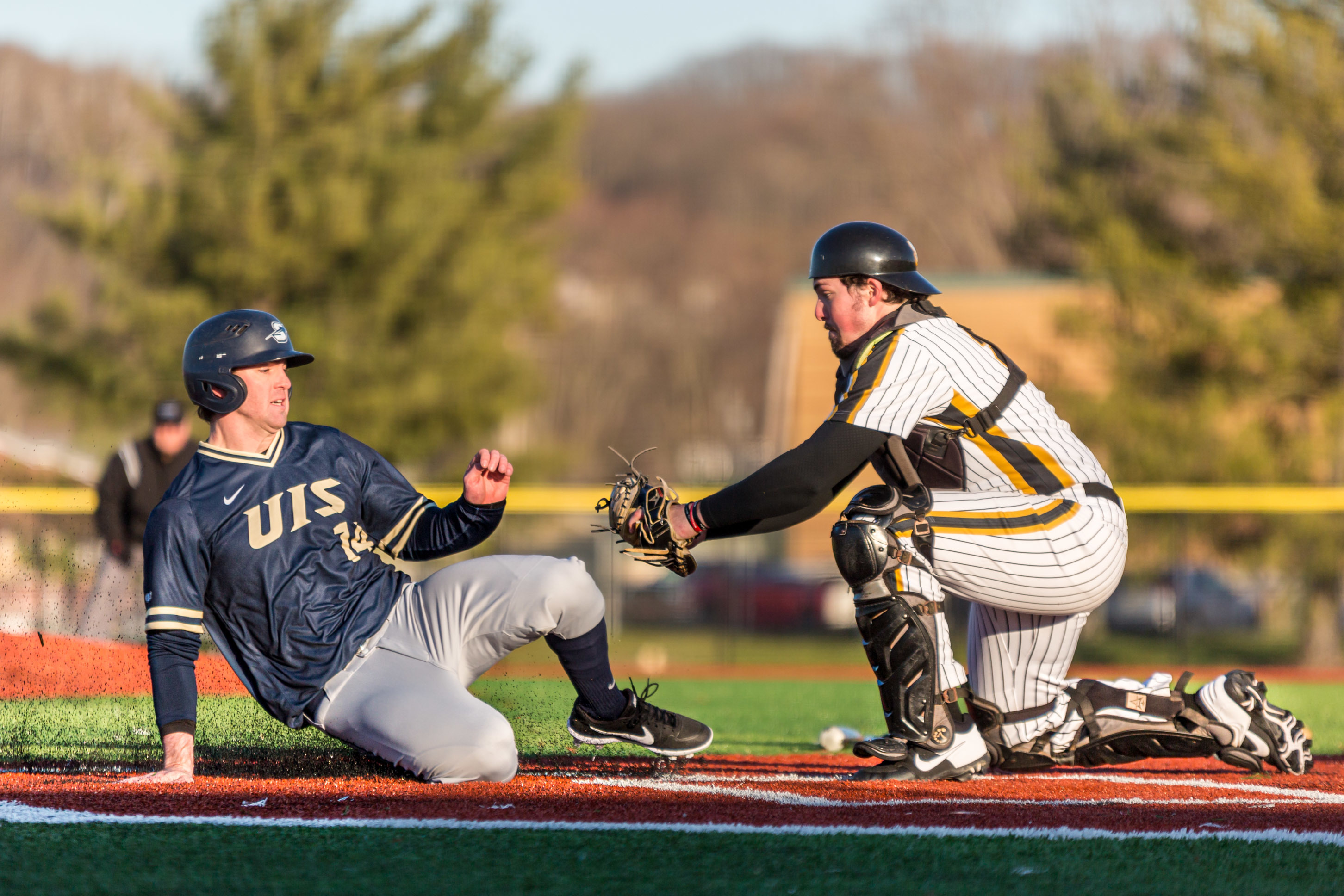
A Yellow Jackets catcher tags a UIS baserunner during a 2020 baseball game.

The athletic teams are known as the Yellow Jackets. WVSU athletic teams include men's football, baseball, basketball, golf, and tennis, and women's basketball, golf, softball, tennis, volleyball and soccer. During the segregation era, the school competed in athletics as "West Virginia" and played other segregated schools as a member of the Colored Intercollegiate Athletic Association. After desegregation, the school withdrew from the CIAA (today's Central Intercollegiate Athletic Association) and competed as "West Virginia State" to avoid confusion with West Virginia University. The school then moved to the formerly all-white West Virginia Intercollegiate Athletic Conference (WVIAC), which competed in the NCAA's Division II. After the dissolution of the WVIAC, WVSU joined the new Mountain East Conference in 2013, which is also part of NCAA Division II. WVSU's main rivals include University of Charleston (WV), Central State University (OH), and Kentucky State University.

During the segregation era, black high schools were barred from competition in the West Virginia Secondary School Activities Commission, and State therefore sponsored an unofficial "state colored championship" from 1932 to 1959.

=== Music ===
WVSU's Music Department is housed in the College of Arts, Humanities, and Public Affairs. WVSU offers two undergraduate degrees in music, a Bachelor of Science in Music Education and a Bachelor of Fine Arts in Music Performance, as well as a music minor.

==== Instrumental ensembles ====
In the mid-late 1990s, the band saw a period of resurgence under the direction of Chris Card. From 1995 until 2000, the band had an enrollment of between 35 and 50 members. Many of the members during this time period were scholarship recipients, and the band often contained 5–10 veterans or active members of Drum Corps International. The band was known for its small size and huge sound. The band marches in a "corps-style" fashion, which features a heel-toe step with instruments angled towards the pressbox (which only Mississippi Valley State University was previously doing among HBCU bands at the time), whereas most HBCU bands marching in a tradition high-stepping style similar to what the Big 10 bands were known for doing in previous decades. The band tries to do a different marching show at every home football game, with the exception of homecoming.

The Yellow Jacket Marching Band, also known as the "Marching Swarm", performs in one parade unless invited to others: the WVSU Homecoming Parade. In 2018, the band performed in Welch, WV's 100th Veteran's Day Parade, the longest ongoing Veteran's Day parade in the nation. The band has also played for the president's "State of the University Address", the Founder's Day ceremony, and previously annually for WVSU's ROTC Hall of Fame Ceremony. They have served as the exhibition band at high school marching band festivals, including Nicholas County's Mountain Band Spectacular (2008–2010), Poca High School's Heritage Day Festival in Poca (2009–2016, 2018), the 2013 WV Marching Band Invitational in Charleston, the 2015 Sissonville High School Cavalcade of Bands Band Festival in Sissonville, the Boone County Coal Classic, hosted by Scott High School in Madison (2018–2019), and the 2025 South Charleston High School Eagle's Nest Invitational in South Charleston. On October 12, 2013, WVSU, in co-sponsorship with the St. Albans High School Music Department, hosted the Cavalcade of Bands Southwest Regional Band Festival, and hosted it again in 2014. In 2008, the band was invited to go to Chicago with the football team for the Chicago Football Classic to participate in the Battle of the Bands competition; the only competition the band has competed in.

The Wind Ensemble has performed at WVSU's commencement ceremonies. Students of the Advanced Conducting studio may also conduct on a concert. The Advanced Conducting studio is a unique feature of WVSU as not many colleges offer it at the undergraduate level. In the spring of 2015, the Symphonic Wind Ensemble performed at The Hamilton in Washington, D.C. for the simultaneous events of D.C.'s 153rd Emancipation Day Celebrations and the 150th Anniversary of Abraham Lincoln's Assassination. Established in fall 2015, WVSU offers a chamber orchestra, named the West Virginia State Philharmonic Orchestra (WVSPO, formerly Charleston Chamber Orchestra), under the baton of Dr. Scott E. Woodard. On their debut concert, the ensemble performed a world premiere of a piece by local composer Matthew Jackfert. In June 2018, the orchestra performed in Carnegie Hall in New York City as part of the Viennese Masters Orchestra Invitational, hosted by Music Celebrations International (MCI), followed by a performance at the Kennedy Center in D.C. in February 2019 for MCI's Capital Orchestra Festival. The WVSPO were set to tour in Vienna as part of a Ludwig van Beethoven festival in the summer of 2020, also as part of MCI, but it was rescheduled to 2021 due to the COVID-19 pandemic; however, the 2021 date also fell through due to the ongoing pandemic.

The Jazz Ensemble performs for various events on and off campus. In November 2007, the Jazz Ensemble traveled to Austria to perform in Vienna, Graz, and Salzburg. On April 12 and 13, 2012, the Jazz Ensemble played two concerts for Washington, D.C.'s 150th Emancipation Day celebrations at the Lincoln Theatre. The April 12 concert featured the WVSU Jazz Ensemble and saxophonist Brian Lenair, while the April 13th concert additionally featured a comedy show by famed comedian Dick Gregory. The Jazz Ensemble returned the following year to perform for the 151st Anniversary on April 16 at Freedom Plaza. The Jazz Ensemble, along with the Concert Choir, performed at The Greenbrier on November 22, 2013, as part of the West Virginia Reading Association (WVRA) conference. In March 2016, the ensemble performed for the West Virginia Music Educators Association (WVMEA) conference.

Other instrumental groups at WVSU include a Brass Ensemble, Guitar Ensemble, Percussion Ensemble, and Woodwind Ensemble. WVSU was also previously the home to the Montclaire String Quartet, which was the Quartet in Residence at WVSU and composed of the principle string players of the West Virginia Symphony Orchestra.

==== Vocal ensembles ====
In addition to the instrumental ensembles, WVSU features a concert choir called the State A Capella and an audition-only chamber vocal ensemble called State Singers. Depending on enrollment, vocal ensembles specifically for male and female groups may also be offered. The State Singers consists of eight to ten vocalists and also occasionally perform as the WVSU Vocal Jazz Choir. The State Singers act as ambassadors for the university and frequently perform off campus for important community and cultural events. Every spring, the State Singers go on tour. Tours have taken the group to Cleveland, Ohio, Virginia Beach, St. Louis, Missouri, and New York City. On April 13 and 14, 2012, the concert choir had the unique opportunity of singing the music of "Queen" with the West Virginia Symphony Orchestra. The concert choir again sang with the WVSO for the symphony's 2012 holiday concerts, and have continued since. In March 2016, the concert choir again joined the symphony, along with three other West Virginia collegiate choirs, to perform the Brahms Requiem.

=== Student life ===
Many of the students who live in dorms on campus are from large urban areas outside of West Virginia or from the rural counties in the state. Those who stay on campus generally congregate at Wilson Student Union.

=== Student media ===
The campus radio station at WVSU can be heard locally on 106.7 FM or over the internet. The station has hosted live music and interviews with recording artists. The campus newspaper, The Yellow Jacket, is published and edited by students and can be picked up in major buildings across the campus.

== Notable alumni ==
- Chu Berry, jazz tenor saxophonist
- Albert Grant Brown (1881–1924), architect and educator; alumnus and professor at West Virginia Colored Institute
- Joan Browning, civil rights activist
- Harriet Elizabeth Byrd, first African-American to serve in the Wyoming Legislature
- Augusta Clark, librarian, politician, and lawyer; second African-American woman to serve on the Philadelphia City Council (1980–2000)
- Paul Dooley, actor
- Herbert Fielding, former South Carolina lawmaker
- Antoine Fuqua, writer and director of various movies, including Training Day (2001), starring Denzel Washington
- Donald L. Graham, senior United States district judge of the United States District Court for the Southern District of Florida
- Robert "RJ" Haddy, special effects artist and twice contestant on Syfy's reality game show Face Off
- Calvin Hicks, African-American photographer, a founder of The Black Gallery
- Katherine Johnson, African-American scientist; made significant contributions to America's aeronautics and space exploration for NASA; in 2018, a statue of Johnson was erected on campus next to the Cole Complex and a scholarship was established in her honor
- Damon Keith, Senior Judge for the United States Court of Appeals for the Sixth Circuit; the Keith Scholars Hall dormitory is named in his honor
- Samuel E. Kelly, university administrator
- Earl Lloyd, first African-American to play in the NBA; in 2014, a statue of Lloyd was erected and is on display in the Walker Convocation Center and the basketball season starts with the Earl Lloyd Classic in his honor, which also began in 2014; in 2018, the street in front of the Convocation Center was renamed to Earl Lloyd Way
- Butch Miles, jazz drummer and a professor in the School of Music at Texas State University-San Marcos
- Lou Myers, actor and theatrical director, played Vernon Gaines in the television sitcom A Different World
- Bill Nunn, journalist, professional football scout, and member of the Black College Football Hall of Fame, the Pittsburgh Pro Football Hall of Fame, and Pro Football Hall of Fame
- Richard Ojeda, former member of the West Virginia Senate, congressman for North Carolina's 9th congressional district; first WVSU alumni elected to the United States Congress
- Leaonead Pack Drain-Bailey, librarian and namesake of WVSU's Drain-Jordan Library
- L. Eudora Pettigrew, former president of SUNY Old Westbury, first African-American president in the SUNY system
- Vincent Reed, District of Columbia Public Schools superintendent
- Will Robinson, first African-American Division I basketball coach and NBA scout
- Charles Calvin Rogers, US Army major general (ret); Congressional Medal of Honor Recipient for his actions in Vietnam; a bust of Rogers was dedicated in 2016 and is on display in the Wilson Student Union
- Leander J. Shaw Jr., first African-American Chief Justice on the Florida Supreme Court
- Wendell Smith, noted African-American sportswriter who was influential in the choice of Jackie Robinson to become the first African-American player in Major League Baseball
- Leon Sullivan, Baptist minister, a civil rights leader and social activist, longtime General Motors board member, and an anti-Apartheid activist; Sullivan Hall is named in his honor
- Bob Thompson, jazz pianist, composer and arranger; in 2015, Thompson was inducted into the West Virginia Music Hall of Fame.
- Reggie B. Walton, senior United States district judge of the United States District Court for the District of Columbia
- Harvey D. Williams, African-American retired United States Army major general
- Carter G. Woodson, African-American historian cited as the father of black history; served as Academic Dean of WVSU 1920–1922

== See also ==
- List of presidents of West Virginia State University
- Storer College
