= James Edwin Campbell (poet) =

African-American poet (1867–1896)

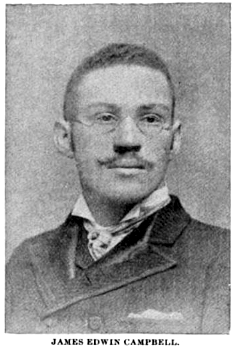
- Portrait from Local and National Poets of America with Interesting Biographical Sketches (1892)

1st President of West Virginia State University (Note: West Virginia State University was founded as the West Virginia Colored Institute in 1891, and was later known as West Virginia Collegiate Institute (1915), West Virginia State College (1929), and finally West Virginia State University (2004). Campbell was titled as a principal during his tenure; however, West Virginia State University considers him the university's first president.)
- In office 1892–1894
- Preceded by: Office established
- Succeeded by: John H. Hill

Principal of Langston Academy
- In office 1891–1892
- Preceded by: Luta Freeman
- Succeeded by: Ida Wilson

Personal details
- Born: September 28, 1867 Pomeroy, Ohio, United States
- Died: January 26, 1896 (aged 28) Pomeroy, Ohio, United States
- Cause of death: typhoid pneumonia
- Spouse: Mary Lewis Champ-Campbell
- Profession: Educator, school administrator, newspaper editor, poet, and essayist
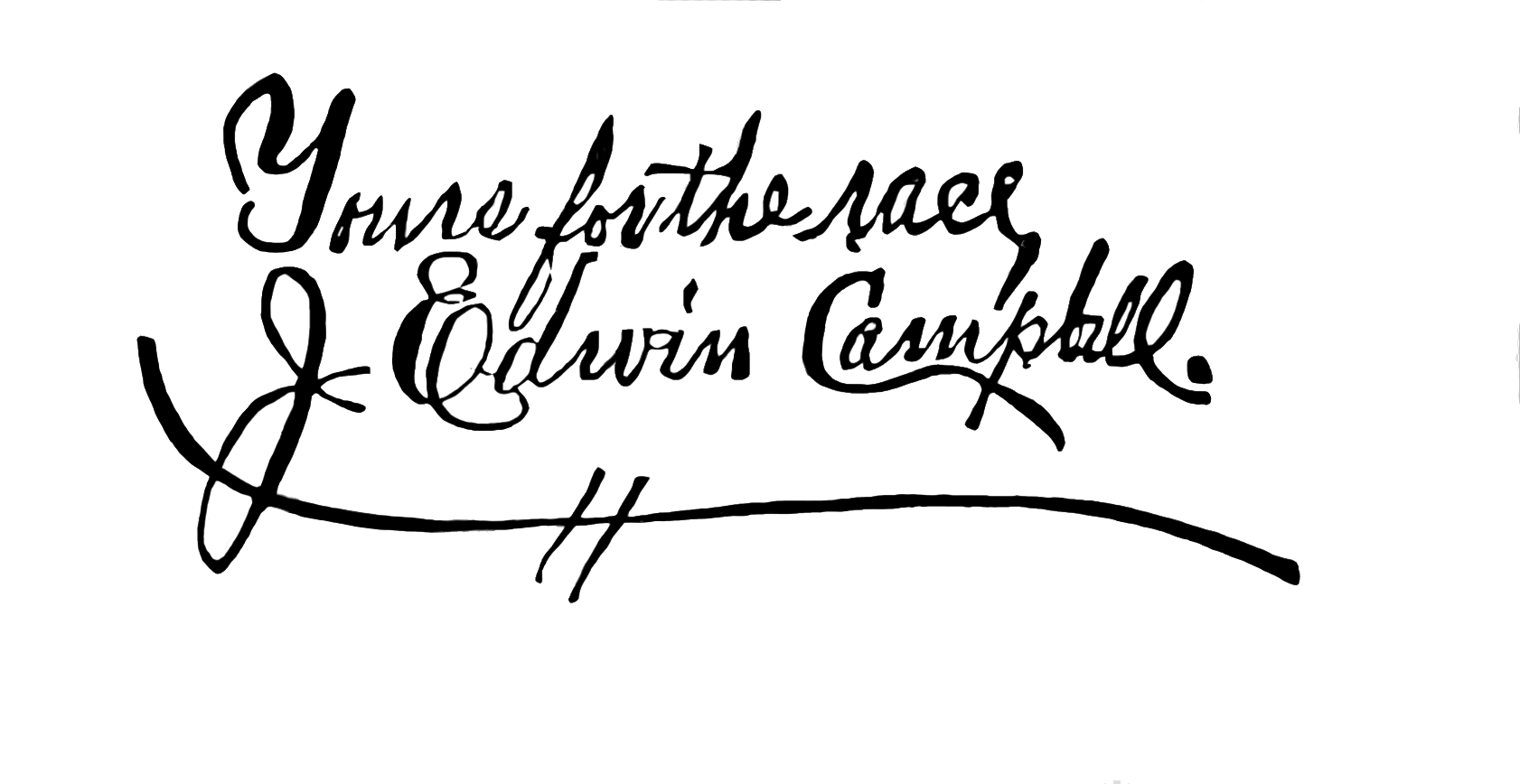
- Signature

James Edwin Campbell (September 28, 1867 – January 26, 1896) was an American educator, school administrator, newspaper editor, poet, and essayist. Campbell was the first principal of the West Virginia Colored Institute (present-day West Virginia State University) from 1892 until 1894, and is considered by the university as its first president.

Campbell was born in 1867 in Pomeroy, Ohio, where he completed his secondary education at Pomeroy Academy in 1884. His first job was as a teacher in Buck Ridge, Ohio, for two years. He relocated to West Virginia, where he served as the editor of The Pioneer and West Virginia Enterprise newspapers. He was the principal of the Point Pleasant Colored School (later known as Langston Academy) from 1891 until 1892. In 1892, he was selected as the first principal of the West Virginia Colored Institute, serving until 1894. He was awarded an honorary Bachelor of Philosophy degree from Shaw University in 1893.

From an early age, Campbell exhibited a talent for writing poetry and stories. He wrote poetry and stories throughout his life. His first book, Driftings and Gleanings, a volume of poetry and essays in standard American English, was published in 1887. Following his resignation from the West Virginia Colored Institute, Campbell relocated to Chicago in 1895, where he became a staff writer for the Chicago Times-Herald. He continued to publish his own poems and articles, and he participated in the publication of Four O'Clock Magazine. In 1895, he published his second book, Echoes from the Cabin and Elsewhere, a collection of poetry in the southern African-American vernacular dialect. He was among the first African-American poets to write in the African-American vernacular dialect.

Campbell died in Pomeroy, Ohio, in 1896 at the age of 28. At West Virginia State University, Campbell is the namesake of Campbell Hall and the Campbell Conference Center.

== Early life and education ==
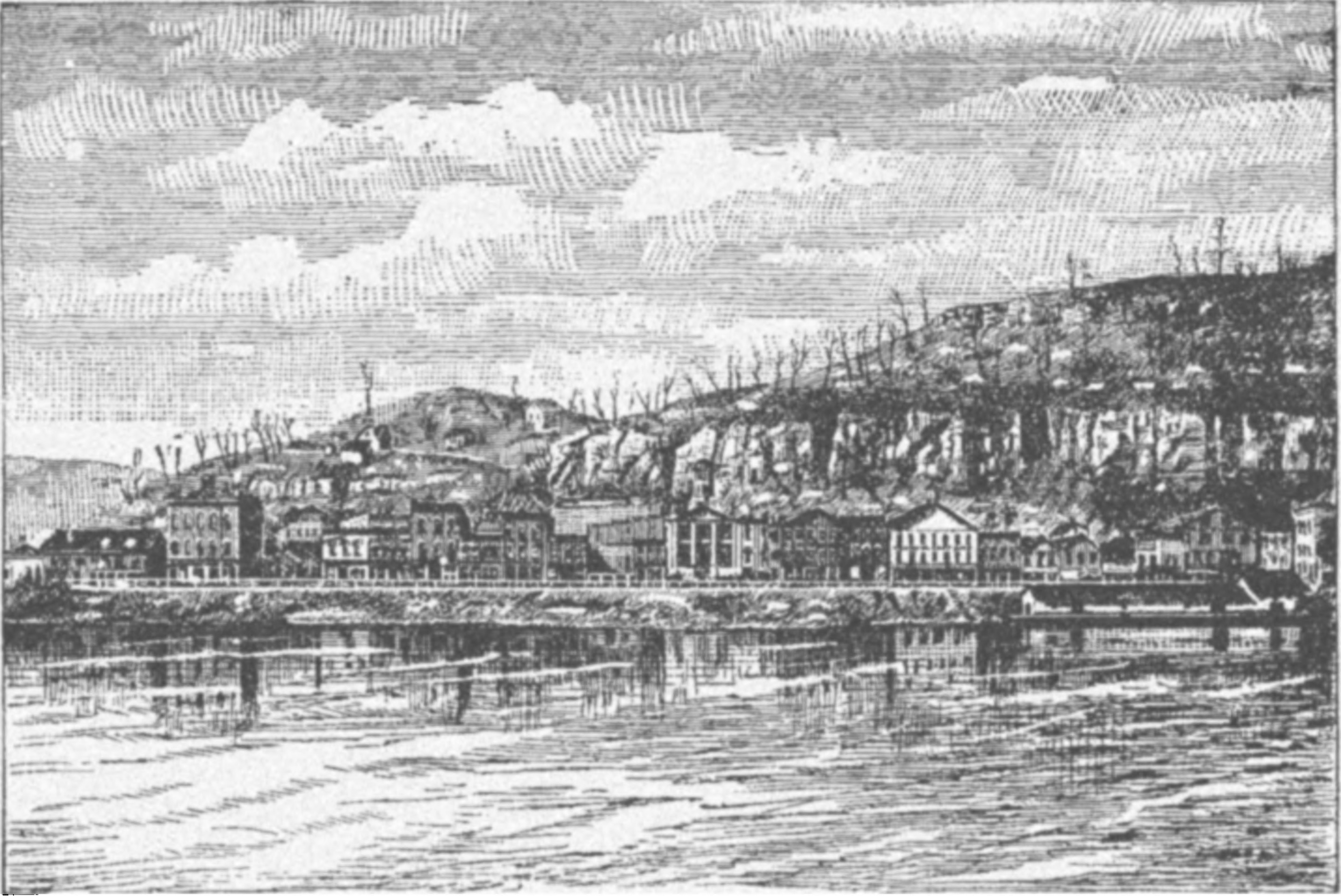
19th-century illustration of Pomeroy, Ohio, from the Ohio River

James Edwin Campbell was born on September 28, 1867, in the Kerr's Run section of Pomeroy, Ohio, to James Edward Campbell and his wife, Aletha "Letha" Esther Starks Campbell. His parents were both born across the Ohio River in Virginia (present-day West Virginia) prior to the American Civil War. Campbell had two older brothers, Charles William Campbell and John C. Campbell. Campbell was raised in Kerr's Run, part of Pomeroy's First Ward. His childhood playmate, future West Virginia state auditor J. S. Darst, cited Campbell as a person who rose to prominence in spite of his early unfavorable environment, and described the "Bloody First" ward of Pomeroy as "tough". Campbell completed his primary education from first to eighth grade at Kerr's Run Colored School, and his secondary education at Pomeroy Academy, where he graduated in 1884.

== Early work in education and newspaper publishing ==
Campbell commenced his career in education in Buck Ridge, Ohio (along the Ohio River), where he served as a teacher for two years. He also taught in Rutland, Ohio, for some time. Campbell viewed West Virginia as a place for the advancement of African Americans due to the economic opportunities offered by the coal and oil industries. He was hired by Christopher Payne to serve as the editor of Payne's The Pioneer newspaper. In 1887, Payne also hired Campbell to replace him as the editor of the West Virginia Enterprise in Charleston. In reporting Campbell's selection as the Enterprise editor, The Wheeling Daily Intelligencer described Campbell as "an educated young Ohioan" that was "highly spoken of".

In addition to his newspaper work, Campbell was also a gifted public speaker. In May 1889, he delivered a lecture entitled "Race Antagonism" at the Simpson Methodist Episcopal Church in Wheeling. The Wheeling Daily Intelligencer remarked that he possessed "a natural gift of oratory, and his address was brimfull of eloquence, besides being instructive and worthy of attention". His lecture earned enough profits for the church to purchase a new Sunday school library.

== Principal of Langston Academy ==
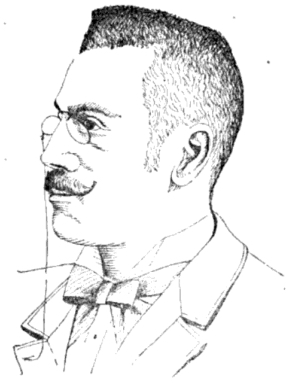
Portrait of Campbell from the Biennial Report of the State Superintendent (1893)

Campbell was selected by the Point Pleasant Board of Education as the principal of the Point Pleasant Colored School in Point Pleasant in 1891, succeeding Luta Freeman. Under Campbell's leadership, the school relocated to a four-room, two-story brick building, which had been vacated by a white school. Following this relocation, the school was renamed Langston Academy in honor of African-American educator John Mercer Langston. Campbell served as principal of Langston Academy until 1892, when he was succeeded by Ida Wilson.

== Principal of the West Virginia Colored Institute ==
On April 1, 1892, the Board of Regents of the West Virginia Colored Institute selected Campbell as the institute's first principal. Located in Farm, West Virginia (an unincorporated community later known as Institute), near Charleston, the institute had been founded in 1891 under the Morrill Act of 1890 to provide West Virginia's African Americans with education in agricultural and mechanical studies.

Prior to Campbell's selection as principal, an act of the West Virginia Legislature appropriated $10,000 for the purchase of a farm on which to construct a building for the institution. A committee empowered by the legislature purchased 30 acres (12 ha) along the Kanawha River, near the community of Farm, which was once part of the estate of Samuel I. Cabell and his wife Mary Barnes Cabell (a former slave). The institute's first building was completed in April 1892 and received by the school's Board of Regents on April 20. Campbell formally opened the institute on April 26, 1892. The institute commenced an experimental term on May 3, 1892, with 20 students. The original curriculum consisted of the equivalent of a high school education, and included agriculture, horticulture, mechanical arts, domestic science, vocational training, and teacher preparation. Campbell asked Booker T. Washington to nominate a Tuskegee Institute graduate to fill the position of the institute's Superintendent of Mechanics. Washington requested that Tuskegee graduate James M. Canty write a letter to Campbell. Canty was hired by Campbell as the Superintendent of Mechanics, and he arrived in Institute on January 3, 1893. By June 1893, the faculty consisted of Campbell, serving as principal and professor of mathematics; Byrd Prillerman, serving as professor of English; Canty, serving as professor of mechanics; and Campbell's wife, Mary Lewis Champ-Campbell, serving as instructor in music, painting, and drawing. In 1893, Campbell was awarded an honorary Bachelor of Philosophy degree from Shaw University.

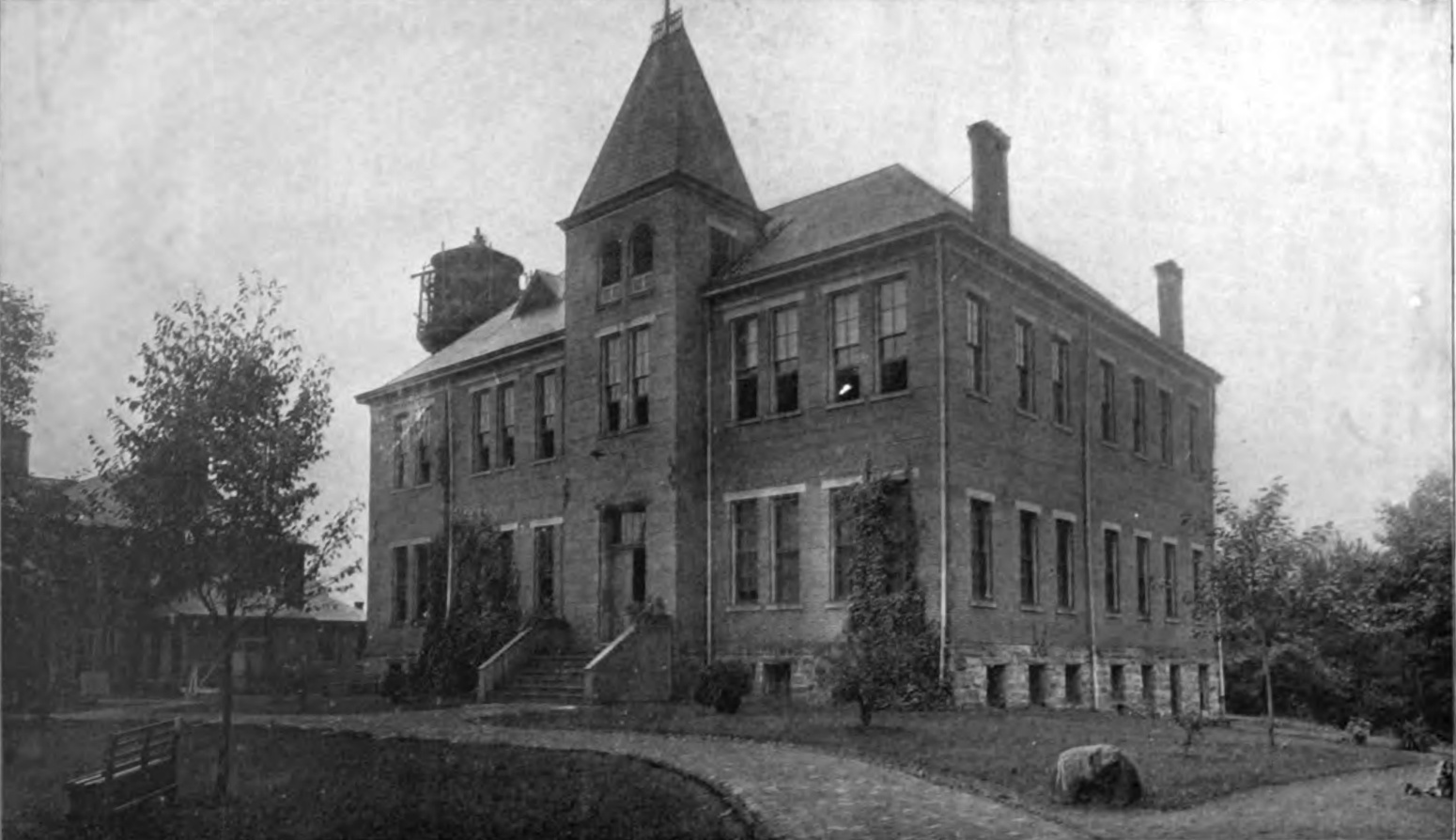
Fleming Hall at West Virginia Colored Institute (1910), where Campbell resided throughout his tenure

As the institute's principal, Campbell provided guidance to West Virginia's African-American coal miners in assisting their children in acquiring an education. Campbell resigned in 1894, and was succeeded by John H. Hill. Throughout his tenure at the institute, Campbell resided in Fleming Hall.

== West Virginia Teachers' Association ==
Campbell and other West Virginia African-American educators established the West Virginia Teachers' Association in 1891 to encourage interest in their work and cooperation throughout the state's African-American teaching corps. The association aimed "to elevate the character and advance the interest of the profession of teaching, and to promote the cause of popular education in West Virginia". Campbell spoke at the association's second annual meeting in Parkersburg in 1892. At the association's third annual meeting in Parkersburg in 1893, Campbell was named president of the association. However, he was absent when the association's fourth annual meeting was held in Montgomery in 1894.

== Writing career ==
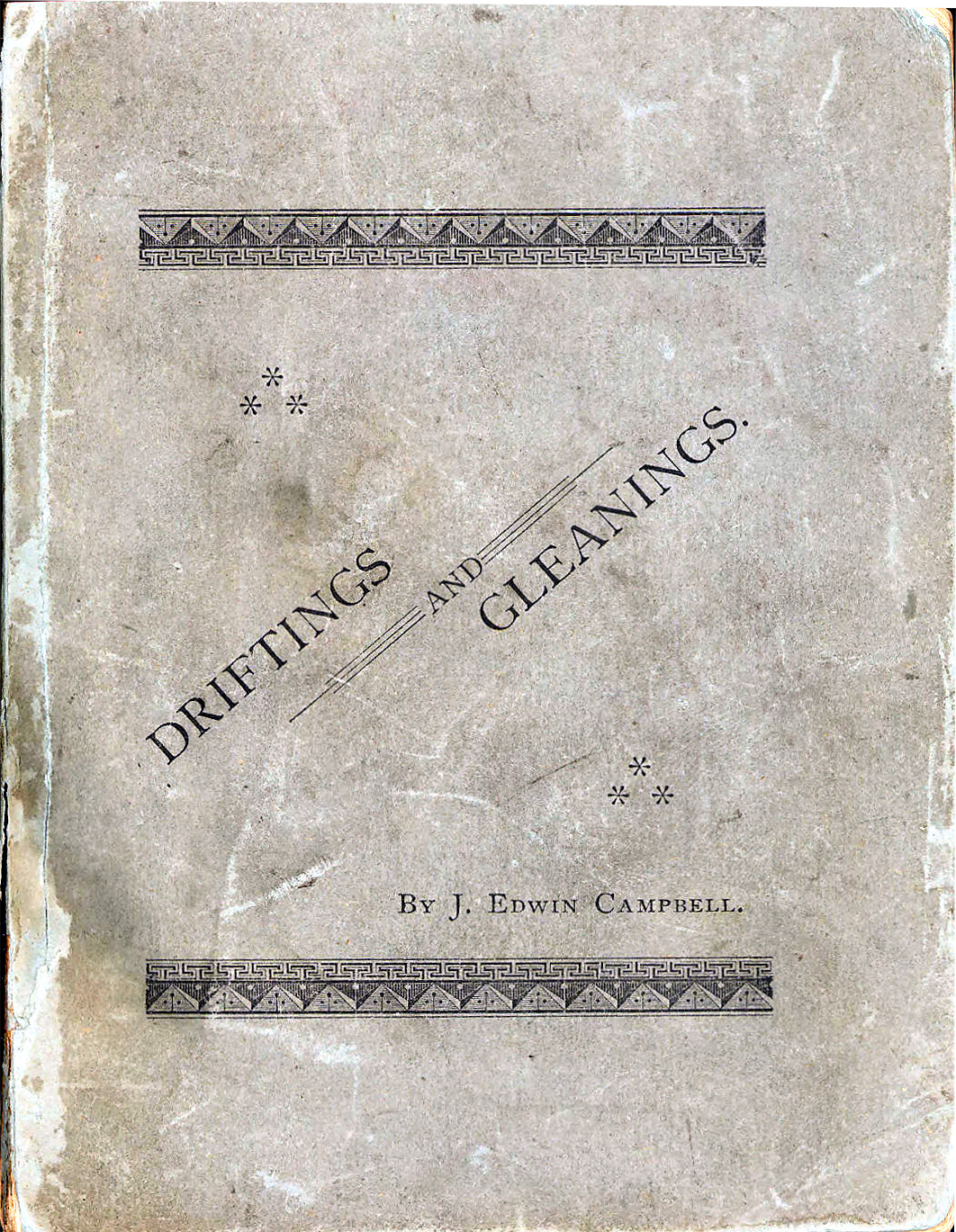
Front cover of Driftings and Gleanings (1887)

From an early age, Campbell exhibited a talent for writing poetry and stories. Early in his writing career, he wrote simple poems in the African-American vernacular dialect, some of which were published in newspapers and magazines. One of his earlier poems, "The Pariah's Love", was written in the style of Thomas Moore's Lalla-Rookh.

Campbell continued to write poetry and stories at his leisure throughout his careers as a schoolteacher and school administrator. In 1887, he published his first book, Driftings and Gleanings, a volume of poetry and essays in standard American English.

Following his resignation from the West Virginia Colored Institute, he relocated to Chicago in the summer of 1895, where he became a staff writer for the Chicago Times-Herald. Campbell reportedly confided in a friend, "Life is too uneventful in a little village. I want to get out into the great world." According to historian Wilhelmena S. Robinson, Campbell's career as a newsman was "his chief contribution to the literary world".

Campbell continued to publish his own poems and articles, and he participated in a group publication of the literary periodical Four O'Clock Magazine. In 1895, he published his second book, Echoes from the Cabin and Elsewhere, a collection of poetry in the southern African-American vernacular dialect. The introduction was written by Richard Linthicum, editor of the Chicago Sunday Times-Herald. Linthicum wrote that Campbell had "caught the true spirit" of African Americans in the Antebellum South in "characteristic verse". According to the Poetry Foundation, this book "is often praised as one of the finest collections of dialect poems of the 19th century, managing to mix realism and folk wisdom with authentic, rhythmic dialect".

== Personal life ==
Campbell married Mary Lewis Champ (July 12, 1868 – October 18, 1909) on August 4, 1891, in Harrison County, Ohio. Champ was the daughter of Joseph L. Champ, an educator and former principal of African-American schools in Jefferson County, Ohio, and Parkersburg, West Virginia, and his wife Eveline Thompson Champ. Mary Lewis Champ enrolled in Oberlin College in 1887, and graduated from the college's Literary Course in 1890. Champ was also a poet and educator, and she taught in Wheeling for one year prior to marrying Campbell.

== Death ==
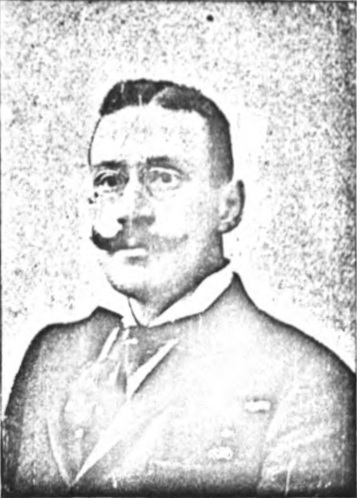
Portrait of Campbell from Echoes from the Cabin and Elsewhere (1895)

Campbell wrote his last poem, "Homesick", on December 7, 1895. Published in The Chicago Conservator, it detailed his longing for the "quiet of the home place". While visiting his family's home in the Kerr's Run section of Pomeroy, Ohio, for the Christmas holiday, Campbell became ill with symptoms of a common cold, followed by a fever. He died of typhoid pneumonia on January 26, 1896, at his family's home. He was survived by his parents and his wife. Campbell was interred at Beech Grove Cemetery in Pomeroy.

Following his death, his wife taught in Pomeroy and then at Kentucky State Normal School for Colored Persons (later known as Kentucky State University) from 1902 until 1903. She relocated to St. Louis, where she died of tonsillitis in 1909.

== Legacy ==
Campbell was among the first African-American poets to write in the African-American vernacular dialect. While Paul Laurence Dunbar is credited with popularizing verse in the African-American vernacular dialect, Campbell published his dialect poetry prior to Dunbar. African-American author and educator J. Saunders Redding stated, "Campbell's dialect is more nearly a reproduction of plantation Negro speech sounds than that of any other writer in American literature ... Campbell's ear alone dictated his language." Civil rights activist and writer James Weldon Johnson described Campbell's dialect as "idiomatically and phonetically ... nearer to the Gullah or the West Indian dialect". Historian Jean Wagner argued that Campbell "had his own highly original talent and was in no sense a borrower". Wagner further stated that Campbell "reveals the upsurge, among blacks, of a racial consciousness that chafes under every yoke". Actor Richard Berry Harrison used Campbell's poems when he delivered dramatic readings.

The Meigs County Historical Society and the Ohio Historical Society erected a historical marker honoring Campbell in Pomeroy in 2007. In 1973, West Virginia State College honored Campbell by naming its vocational building Campbell Hall. When the college transitioned its former home economics cottage into a conference center, it named the facility the Campbell Conference Center after Campbell. In 2019, the Meigs County Historical Society unveiled a Meigs County Bicentennial Marker at the site of Campbell's primary school, Kerr's Run Colored School, and concluded the unveiling ceremony with a reading from one of Campbell's books.

Campbell was portrayed by actor George Dale Jr. in the 2020 film River of Hope, which tells the story of Samuel I. Cabell and his wife Mary Barnes Cabell and of how their children helped to found West Virginia State University.

== Selected works ==
=== Books ===
- Driftings and Gleanings. Charleston, West Virginia: The State Tribune. 1887. OCLC 36136365.
- Echoes from the Cabin and Elsewhere. Chicago: Donohue & Henneberry. 1895. OCLC 1154904646.

=== Poems ===
- "A Night in June"
- "Mobile-Buck"
- "Ol' Doc' Hyar"
- "The Gobble-un Gets Him"

== Bibliography ==
- Burkett, Eva Mae (1978). American English Dialects in Literature. Metuchen, New Jersey: Scarecrow Press. ISBN 9780810811515. LCCN 78017742. OCLC 832514630 – via Internet Archive.
- Canty, James M. (1905). "The Story of a Supervisor of Mechanical Industries". Tuskegee and Its People: Their Ideals and Achievements. New York: D. Appleton & Company: 299–316. OCLC 776626949 – via Internet Archive.
- Haught, James A. (January 1971). "Institute: It Springs from Epic Love Story". West Virginia History. 32 (2). Charleston, West Virginia: West Virginia Archives and History: 101–107. OCLC 11393600. Archived from the original on December 17, 2017 – via West Virginia Division of Culture and History.
- Jones, James McHenry (1904). "The West Virginia Colored Institute". History of Education in West Virginia. Charleston, West Virginia: The Tribune Printing Company: 285–290. LCCN 05015334. OCLC 578625700 – via Internet Archive.
- Jordan, L. R. (1907). "Langston School (Colored) Point Pleasant". History of Education in West Virginia. Charleston, West Virginia: The Tribune Printing Company: 272–273. OCLC 578625783 – via Internet Archive.
- Morgan, Benjamin S., ed. (1893). Biennial Report of the State Superintendent of Free Schools of the State of West Virginia for the Years 1891 and 1892. Charleston, West Virginia: Moses W. Donnally, Public Printer. OCLC 3755995. Archived from the original on June 6, 2020 – via Google Books.
- Oberlin College (April 1900). Quinquennial Catalogue of Officers and Graduates 1900. Bulletins of Oberlin College. Vol. I. Oberlin, Ohio: Oberlin College, News Printing Company. OCLC 551550077 – via Internet Archive.
- Oberlin College (1910). Annual Reports of the President and Treasurer of Oberlin College 1909-10. Oberlin, Ohio: Oberlin College – via Internet Archive.
- Pickens, Jordan D.; Pickens, Calee M. (2019). Historic Tales of Meigs County, Ohio. Charleston, South Carolina: Arcadia Publishing, History Press. ISBN 9781467144254. OCLC 1111380575. Archived from the original on June 17, 2020 – via Google Books.
- Robinson, Wilhelmena S. (1968). Historical Negro Biographies. International Library of Negro Life and History. New York: Publishers Company, Inc., under the auspices of the Association for the Study of Negro Life and History. ISBN 9780877812036. LCCN 68002920. OCLC 1035607110 – via Internet Archive.
- Scott, I. Leonard (1904). "Point Pleasant Colored School". History of Education in West Virginia. Charleston, West Virginia: The Tribune Printing Company: 309. LCCN 05015334. OCLC 578625700 – via Internet Archive.
- Wagner, Jean (1973). Black Poets of the United States: From Paul Laurence Dunbar to Langston Hughes. Urbana, Illinois & Chicago: University of Illinois Press. ISBN 0252003411. OCLC 1090989942. Archived from the original on September 18, 2020 – via Google Books.
- West Virginia Collegiate Institute (1924). El Ojo (PDF). Institute, West Virginia: Alpha Zeta chapter, Alpha Phi Alpha fraternity, West Virginia Collegiate Institute. Archived from the original (PDF) on June 17, 2020 – via Drain-Jordan Library, West Virginia State University.
- West Virginia State University (2014). Vision 2020: State's Roadmap To The Future (PDF). Institute, West Virginia: West Virginia State University. Archived from the original (PDF) on December 10, 2017.
- Woodson, Carter G. (January 1922). "Early Negro Education in West Virginia". The Journal of Negro History. 7 (1). Washington, D.C.: Association for the Study of Negro Life and History: 23–63. doi:10.2307/2713579. hdl:2027/osu.32435074353632. JSTOR 2713579 – via Internet Archive.
