= Hugh Gloster =

Seventh president of Morehouse College

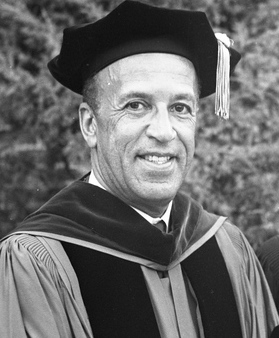

7th President of Morehouse College
- In office July 1, 1967 – 1987
- Preceded by: Benjamin Mays
- Succeeded by: Leroy Keith

Personal details
- Born: May 11, 1911 Brownsville, Tennessee
- Died: January 16, 2002 (aged 90)
- Spouse(s): Louise Elisabeth Torrence, Beulah Victoria Harold (m. 1957–1985), Yvonne King (m. 1989)
- Education: Morehouse College, Atlanta University, New York University

Hugh Morris Gloster (May 11, 1911 - February 16, 2002) was the seventh president of Morehouse College, responsible for establishing the Morehouse School of Medicine and the international studies program,. He was also one of the founders of the College Language Association.

== Early years ==
Hugh Gloster was born in Brownsville, Tennessee, to John and Dora Gloster and grew up in Memphis.

During World War II, Gloster was USO Program Director at Fort Huachuca and USO Associate Regional Executive in Atlanta. After that, he served as an administrator with the USO and the Hampton Institute. Before moving to Morehouse in 1967, Gloster taught at LeMoyne and Morehouse Colleges. In the 1950's he was the first Black to teach at the College of William and Mary, albeit in a summer program where he taught English to Japanese students. From 1953 to 1955, he stayed in Hiroshima with his family as a Fulbright Program professor.

== Morehouse College ==
Gloster was chosen as Morehouse's next president by Benjamin Mays, the previous president, with the agreement of Rev. Dr. Martin Luther King Jr., then on the board of trustees. He was the first alumnus president of Morehouse College.

Under Gloster's leadership the campus Morehouse doubled in size, as well as in the number of faculty members and their salaries. After retiring he served on the Morehouse College Board of Trustees until his death.

== Personal life ==
Gloster was married three times, to Louise Elisabeth Torrence, Beulah Victoria Harold, and Yvonne King Gloster. He had three children and four step-children.

On September 3, 1942 Gloster was beaten, arrested, and thrown off of the Jim Crow coach when he asked the conductor if two white occupants could move to another coach, due to overcrowding. Gloster signed a statement under duress and was fined $10, admitting to disorderly conduct and breaking Jim Crow law after he was threatened with a long jail term or a chain-gang sentence. Ironically, Spike Lee referenced Gloster as having voiced discriminating comments against Black people with dark complexion. Lee stated that Gloster complained that the actor portraying the college president in "School Daze" was too dark skinned.

== Death and legacy ==
Hugh Gloster died on January 16, 2002, at the age of 90. The Hugh Gloster building of the medical school is named for him.

== Publications ==
- Negro Voices in American Fiction (1948)
- The Brown thrush : anthology of verse by Negro students (1935)
