= Robert Bone =

American literary scholar (1924–2007)

Robert Adamson Bone
- Born: 1924
- Died: November 25, 2007 (aged 82–83)
- Education: Yale University
- Occupation: Scholar
- Notable work: The Negro Novel in America

Robert Adamson Bone (1924 – November 25, 2007) was a scholar of African-American literature and a professor of English at Columbia University.

== Biography ==
Bone was a conscientious objector during World War II. He received a B.A. in English from Yale University in 1945. He was National Secretary of the Young People's Socialist League from 1946 to 1947, and then from 1947 to 1948 he worked in the automotive industry in Flint, Michigan. Returning to Yale, he earned a master's degree in American studies in 1949 and a doctorate in 1955. Bone taught at Yale and at the University of California, Los Angeles, before joining the faculty at Teachers College, Columbia, where he taught from 1965 to 1990.

== Works ==
Bone's book The Negro Novel in America, his Yale dissertation, was published in two editions in 1958 and 1965, and translated into Japanese. Reviewer August Meier places it within the New Criticism movement, and calls it a "brilliant and provocative study". In it, Bone identifies four periods of African-American literature: a period of assimilation into the white middle class from 1890 to 1920, the pluralism of the Harlem Renaissance in the 1920s, a period of naturalism and protest during the Great Depression of the 1930s, and a "revolt against protest" in the 1940s. He discusses in detail many novels from each period, reserving particular praise for Richard Wright's Native Son (1940) and Ralph Ellison's Invisible Man (1952).

Bone also wrote Down Home: A History of Afro-American Short Fiction from its Beginnings to the End of the Harlem Renaissance (Putnam, 1975) and a short book on Native Son author Richard Wright. A manuscript left unfinished at Bone's death was completed by Richard A. Courage and published as The Muse in Bronzeville: African American Creative Expression in Chicago, 1932–1950 (Rutgers University Press, 2011).

Another of Bone's contributions is the name of the "Black Chicago Renaissance", a period of expansion for African-American culture in Chicago prior to World War II.
