= Byrd Prillerman =

American educator (1859–1929)

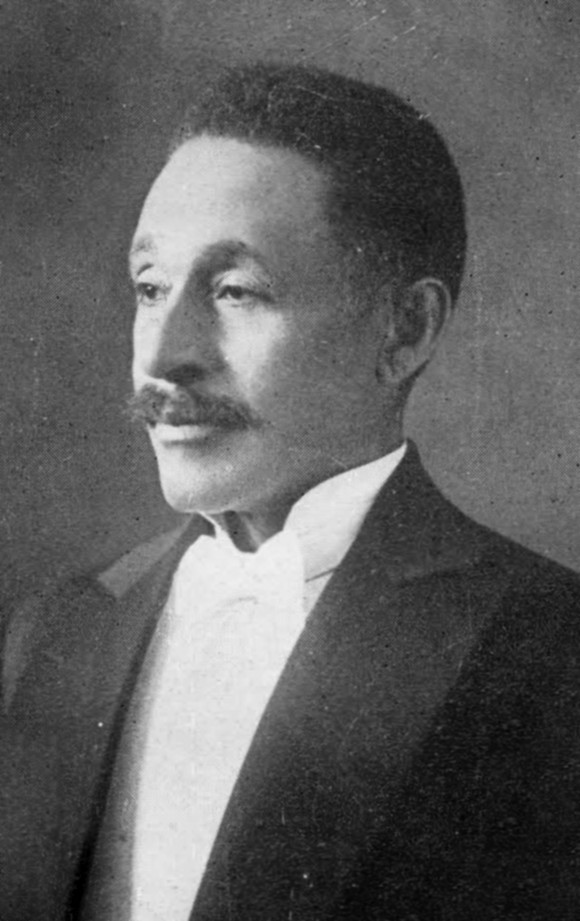
- Portrait of Prillerman from the El Ojo yearbook (1923)

4th President of West Virginia State University (Note: West Virginia State University was founded as the West Virginia Colored Institute in 1891, and was later known as West Virginia Collegiate Institute (1915), West Virginia State College (1929), and finally West Virginia State University (2004). Prillerman was titled as the institute's fourth principal during his tenure; however, West Virginia State University considers him the university's fourth president.)
- In office 1909–1919
- Preceded by: James McHenry Jones
- Succeeded by: John Warren Davis

Personal details
- Born: October 19, 1859 Franklin County, Virginia, United States
- Died: April 25, 1929 (aged 69) Kanawha City, West Virginia, United States
- Resting place: Rakes-Peters Cemetery; Institute, West Virginia, United States
- Spouse: Mattie Eugenia Brown Prillerman
- Children: Delbert McCulloch Prillerman; Ednora Mae Prillerman Cooper; Myrtle Elizabeth Prillerman

Byrd Prillerman (October 19, 1859 – April 25, 1929) was an American educator and school administrator. Prillerman was the fourth principal of the West Virginia Collegiate Institute (present-day West Virginia State University) from 1909 until 1919 and is considered by West Virginia State as the institution's fourth president. Byrd Prillerman School in Raleigh County, West Virginia, was named for him. The school burned in 1962 and was not rebuilt. A scholarship has been established commemorating the school. Prillerman Hall at West Virginia State University is named for him.

Prillerman taught at West Virginia Collegiate Institute before becoming its president. John Warren Davis succeeded him as president. He served as its president from 1909 to 1919.

== See also ==
- List of presidents of West Virginia State University
