= Institute, West Virginia =

Unincorporated community in West Virginia, US

- Unincorporated community
- Location within West Virginia and the United States Institute (the United States)
- Coordinates: 38°23′1″N 81°45′55″W
- Country: United States
- State: West Virginia
- County: Kanawha
- Elevation: 623 ft (190 m)
- Time zone: UTC-5 (Eastern (EST))
  - Summer (DST): UTC-4 (EDT)

Institute is an unincorporated community on the Kanawha River in Kanawha County, West Virginia, United States. Interstate 64 and West Virginia Route 25 pass by the community, which has grown to intermingle with nearby Dunbar. As of the 2020 census, Institute had a population of 569.

The town was founded by a formerly enslaved woman, Mary Barnes. Institute is home to West Virginia State University (formerly the West Virginia Colored Institute and the source of the town's toponym) and the West Virginia State Police Academy. Its economy includes several major industrial plants, which have had a number of environmental incidents polluting the local community.

== History ==
=== Prehistoric community ===
The community is the location of the prehistoric Shawnee Reservation Mound, one of three remaining Adena-era earthwork mounds and enclosures found in an eight-mile stretch along the river. Also called Fairgrounds Mound and Poorhouse Mound, it is now located within Shawnee Regional Park. The mound is about 20 feet high and 80 feet in basal diameter, but was originally 25 feet high and greater than 80 feet in diameter.

In the late 19th century, the Smithsonian Institution inventoried an Adena-era complex along the Kanawha River that had more than 50 earthwork mounds and ten enclosures. These works were likely built by indigenous peoples from approximately 300 BCE to 200 CE. During a 1902 archaeological exploration by Gerard Fowke, a total of 27 fully wrapped mummies were discovered in near perfect conditions due to the unique qualities of the local weather conditions. Most of these mounds have been lost to development in the area, particularly of Charleston.

=== Settlement and history ===
The community was established on the land of formerly enslaved Mary Barnes. She bequeathed land to her children that became Institute and later the West Virginia State University.

A synthetic rubber plant was constructed in the town during World War II.

Located on the campus of West Virginia State University are the historic East Hall and Canty House, both listed on the National Register of Historic Places in 1988.

State legislator and “colored” orphans institute superintendent Howard H. Railey died at his home in Institute.

== Industrial accidents ==
=== 2008 chemical explosion ===
In August 2008 a chemical plant explosion here killed two and injured eight at the Bayer CropScience facility.

=== 2026 chemical disaster ===
On April 22, 2026 a chemical disaster at a silver catalysis plant in Institute killed 2 and injured 30.
