= John Warren Davis (college president) =

American college president and civil rights activist

- Davis in 1968

5th President of West Virginia State University (Note: West Virginia State University was founded as the West Virginia Colored Institute in 1891, and was later known as West Virginia Collegiate Institute (1915), West Virginia State College (1929), and finally West Virginia State University (2004). Davis served as president while the institution was known as West Virginia Collegiate Institute and West Virginia State College; however, West Virginia State University considers Davis the university's fifth president.)
- In office 1919–1953
- Preceded by: Byrd Prillerman
- Succeeded by: William James Lord Wallace

Director of the U.S. Technical Cooperation Administration Program for Liberia
- In office 1952–1954

Special Director of the NAACP Legal Defense and Educational Fund Teacher Information and Security Program
- In office 1955–1972

Personal details
- Born: February 11, 1888 Milledgeville, Georgia, United States
- Died: July 12, 1980 (aged 92) Englewood, New Jersey, United States
- Spouse(s): Bessie Rucker (m. 1916; died 1931) Ethel McGhee (m. 1932)
- Children: Constance Davis Welch; Dorothy Davis McDaniel; Caroline Davis Gleiter
- Education: Atlanta Baptist College (Morehouse College); University of Chicago

John Warren Davis (February 11, 1888 – July 12, 1980) was an American educator, college administrator, and civil rights leader. He was the fifth and longest-serving president of West Virginia State University in Institute, West Virginia, a position he held from 1919 to 1953. Born in Milledgeville, Georgia, Davis relocated to Atlanta in 1903 to attend high school at Atlanta Baptist College (later known as Morehouse College). He worked his way through high school and college at Morehouse and graduated with a Bachelor of Arts degree in 1911. At Morehouse, Davis formed associations with John Hope, Mordecai Wyatt Johnson, Samuel Archer, Benjamin Griffith Brawley, Booker T. Washington, and W. E. B. Du Bois. He completed graduate studies in chemistry and physics at the University of Chicago from 1911 to 1913 and served on the faculty of Morehouse as the registrar and as a professor in chemistry and physics. While in Atlanta, Davis helped to found one of the city's first chapters of the National Association for the Advancement of Colored People (NAACP).

Davis served as the executive secretary of the Twelfth Street YMCA in Washington, D.C., from 1917 to 1919 when he was elected as the president of West Virginia Collegiate Institute. Under his leadership the school, (later renamed West Virginia State College), became one of the leading historically black colleges and universities and land-grant universities in the United States, in both academics and athletics. Through Davis' efforts, West Virginia Collegiate Institute became the first African American college to be accredited by the North Central Association of Colleges and Schools (NCA) in 1927. Under his leadership, the college became home to the West Virginia Schools for the Colored Deaf and Blind and to West Virginia's Extension Service for African Americans. Davis also secured a Civilian Pilot Training Program (CPTP) and Army Specialized Training Program (ASTP) unit for the college during World War II. Through his efforts and educational statesmanship, Davis laid the groundwork for West Virginia State's transition into an integrated institution, and white students began enrolling in large numbers toward the end of his presidency.

U.S. President Harry S. Truman appointed Davis as a charter member to the first National Science Board for the National Science Foundation, on which he served from 1950 to 1956. In addition, President Truman appointed Davis as the director of the Technical Cooperation Administration program in Liberia from 1952 to 1954. Davis helped to establish the NAACP Legal Defense and Educational Fund (NAACP LDF), and he served as special director of the NAACP LDF Teacher Information and Security Program from 1955 to 1972. In this role, he administered the NAACP LDF's scholarship programs for African American undergraduate, graduate, and professional students. In his later life, Davis was appointed to the U.S. National Commission for the United Nations Educational, Scientific and Cultural Organization (UNESCO) and served as a member of the Bergen County College board of trustees. Davis continued to work as an active consultant for the NAACP LDF and serve as the head of its Herbert Lehman Fund until his death in 1980. Davis was a recipient of 14 honorary degrees throughout his lifetime, and he was awarded Haiti's National Order of Honour and Merit (1948) and Liberia's Order of the Star of Africa (1955) for his service to those countries.

== Early life and education ==
John Warren Davis was born on February 11, 1888, in Milledgeville, Georgia. He was the son of Robert Marion Davis, a merchant, and his wife, Katie Mann Davis. Davis' mother was the biracial daughter of a white pastor. He was raised at his maternal grandfather's home from the age of five, after his parents relocated to Savannah, Georgia, with their other children.

Davis attended elementary school in Milledgeville; however, since there were no public high schools for African Americans in the U.S. state of Georgia, Davis relocated to Atlanta, Georgia, in 1903 to attend Atlanta Baptist College (later known as Morehouse College). He worked his way through high school and college at Morehouse, and gained the attention of the college's first African American president, John Hope, while polishing the floor of his house. Hope, known as "the maker of college presidents," elevated Davis to a position in the college's business office. Davis completed the school's academic course in 1907 and graduated with a Bachelor of Arts (with honors) in 1911.

While attending Morehouse, Davis was a roommate of Mordecai Wyatt Johnson, who later served as president of Howard University; they remained longstanding friends. Davis and Johnson both played for Morehouse's football team; Davis was a defensive end. They befriended Charles H. Wesley in 1910 while playing for the team. In addition to Hope, Davis was influenced by Morehouse professors Samuel Archer and Benjamin Griffith Brawley. Davis attended Morehouse during the ongoing Atlanta Compromise debate between Booker T. Washington and W. E. B. Du Bois over the future of African American education. Davis sided with Du Bois in this ideological debate, and he "began to formulate his lifetime philosophies and commitment to the educational development of the black community." Davis received counsel from both Washington and Du Bois, and he remained a lifelong friend of Du Bois.

With Hope's encouragement, Davis completed graduate studies in chemistry and physics at the University of Chicago from 1911 to 1913. Davis and other African American students were able to attend the university by working after-hour and summer jobs, which were secured for them by an influential African American benefactor at Chicago's Union Stock Yards.

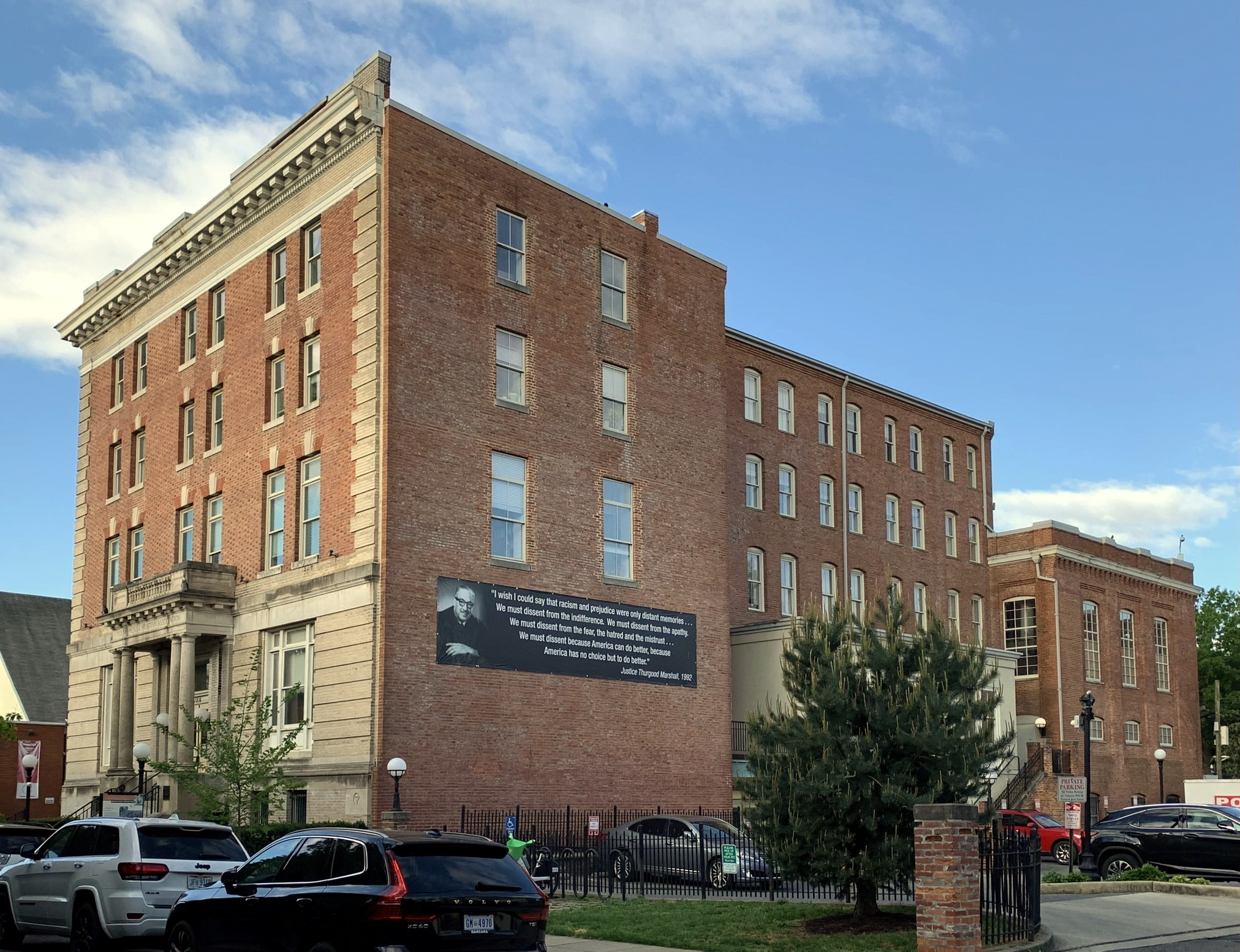
Twelfth Street YMCA Building in Washington, D.C.

Davis commenced his career in education as a member of the Morehouse faculty, where he served as the registrar from 1914 to 1917, and as a professor of chemistry and physics. Davis also served on the college's standing committee on athletics, and taught physics for the college's academy. In 1915, Davis assisted African American educator and historian Carter G. Woodson in establishing the Association for the Study of Negro Life and History. He also helped Walter Francis White to found one of the city's first chapters of the National Association for the Advancement of Colored People (NAACP).

Throughout his early years in the segregated American South, Davis overcame racial discrimination, which included being forced out of a Mississippi town at gunpoint for entering a store that refused service to African Americans, and being prevented from attending an educational conference at Georgia State College by the Ku Klux Klan.

In 1917, Davis was hired as the executive secretary of the Twelfth Street Branch of the Young Men's Christian Association (YMCA) in Washington, D.C., by Jesse E. Moorland of the YMCA's Colored Men's Department. Davis served in this position until 1919.

== President of West Virginia State College ==
On August 20, 1919, Davis was selected to succeed Byrd Prillerman as the fifth president of West Virginia Collegiate Institute in Institute, West Virginia; he commenced his presidency on September 1, 1919. The institute had been founded in 1891 as the West Virginia Colored Institute, under the Morrill Act of 1890, to provide West Virginia's African Americans with education in agricultural and mechanical studies. Davis was elected as the school's president through his association with Morehouse president John Hope, and a personal recommendation from his friend Carter G. Woodson. While he had no previous experience as an educational administrator, Woodson promised to give him advice and assistance, so Davis accepted the position. Davis then invited Woodson to assist him by serving as the Academic Dean of the institute's college department. Woodson accepted this position because he was grateful to have employment, and the $2,700-per-year salary enabled him to operate his Journal of Negro History. Woodson had been offered the presidency of the West Virginia Collegiate Institute in 1919 but declined due to the administrative duties required to operate a college, as it would have left him with little time to research and write.

=== Expansion and improvement of the campus and curriculum ===
Under Davis' leadership, West Virginia Collegiate Institute became one of the leading historically black colleges and universities and land-grant universities in the United States, in both academics and athletics. At the time of Davis' arrival, the institute suffered from depressed academic and physical conditions. He transformed the school's campus during his first ten years of leadership through the construction of new buildings. He also expanded and improved the school's academic programs and curriculum. Davis recruited some of the nation's preeminent African American educators to join the school's faculty. In 1922, Carter G. Woodson described the institute under Davis' leadership as "a reorganized college furnishing facilities for education not offered elsewhere for the youth of West Virginia."

The 1922 Biennial Report of the State Supervisor of Negro Schools of West Virginia noted "steady and commendable" progress had been made at West Virginia Collegiate Institute under Davis' management. The report stated that a new dormitory for female students had been erected, and many new volumes had been added to the school's library, and it also noted, "this institution is possibly the best equipped State-supported college for Negroes in America." Despite the school's progress under Davis, the report noted the institute's work was hampered by inadequate classroom facilities, and acknowledged the need for "an administration building, a gymnasium, library, and cottages for teachers."

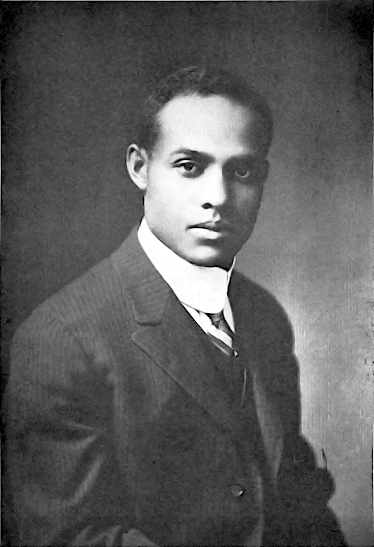
Portrait of Davis from the El Ojo yearbook (1923)

Through Davis' efforts, West Virginia Collegiate Institute became the first African American college to be accredited by the North Central Association of Colleges and Schools (NCA) in 1927. In Davis' annual report for the school in 1927, he stated that the institute was the first ever U.S. college with an African American president and full African American faculty to become fully accredited. Davis later become the first African American member of NCA's Committee on Institutions of Higher Education. West Virginia Collegiate Institute changed its name to West Virginia State College in 1929, and it began conferring college degrees. Soon after this transition, West Virginia State became home to the West Virginia Schools for the Colored Deaf and Blind and to West Virginia's Extension Service for African Americans. Following the integration of West Virginia's graduate schools in 1939, Davis selected the first three African American students to be offered entrance into West Virginia University, one of whom was Katherine Johnson.

During his tenure as West Virginia State's president, the college's enrollment increased from around 20 students in 1919 to a peak enrollment of between 1,850 and 1,900 students at the time of his departure in 1953. Through his efforts and educational statesmanship, Davis laid the groundwork for West Virginia State's transition into an integrated institution. Davis supported the desegregation of schools over further equalization of African American institutions, and in 1946, he stated, "Negro education postulates doctrines of minimization of personality, social and economic mediocrity, and second class citizenship. The remaining task for it is to die. The aim of all segregated institutions should be to work themselves out of a job." Under Davis, West Virginia State began enrolling white students before 1950, in violation of state law, and it became the first historically black college to enroll large numbers of white students. White students began entering West Virginia State in increasing numbers during the final years of Davis' presidency, and the college ceased having a majority of African American students. By 1965, white students accounted for 71 percent of the college's enrollment. Davis resigned his position as president of the college in 1953, and was elected president emeritus of West Virginia State following his departure.

=== Early African American educational history of West Virginia ===
Davis initiated a study of early African American educational history in West Virginia and appointed a committee to undertake the study's research and data collection. Carter G. Woodson served as the committee's chairperson and developed a questionnaire that was disseminated among West Virginia's African American communities and institutions to gather facts. At the conclusion of this study, Davis held a presentation of its findings as part of the West Virginia Collegiate Institute Founder's Day celebration on May 3, 1921. Many of the living pioneers of early African American education in West Virginia were invited to address this meeting to share their experiences. In 1922, Woodson published the study's findings in the article, "Early Negro Education in West Virginia," in his Journal of Negro History. In 1922, Woodson began receiving a grant from the Carnegie Corporation of New York for the operation of his Journal of Negro History and shortly thereafter, he resigned his position as dean of the West Virginia Collegiate Institute in June of that year. Davis accepted Woodson's resignation, and while he was disappointed in his decision, he understood Woodson's devotion to promoting African American history.

=== Extension Service and State 4-H Camp for African Americans ===
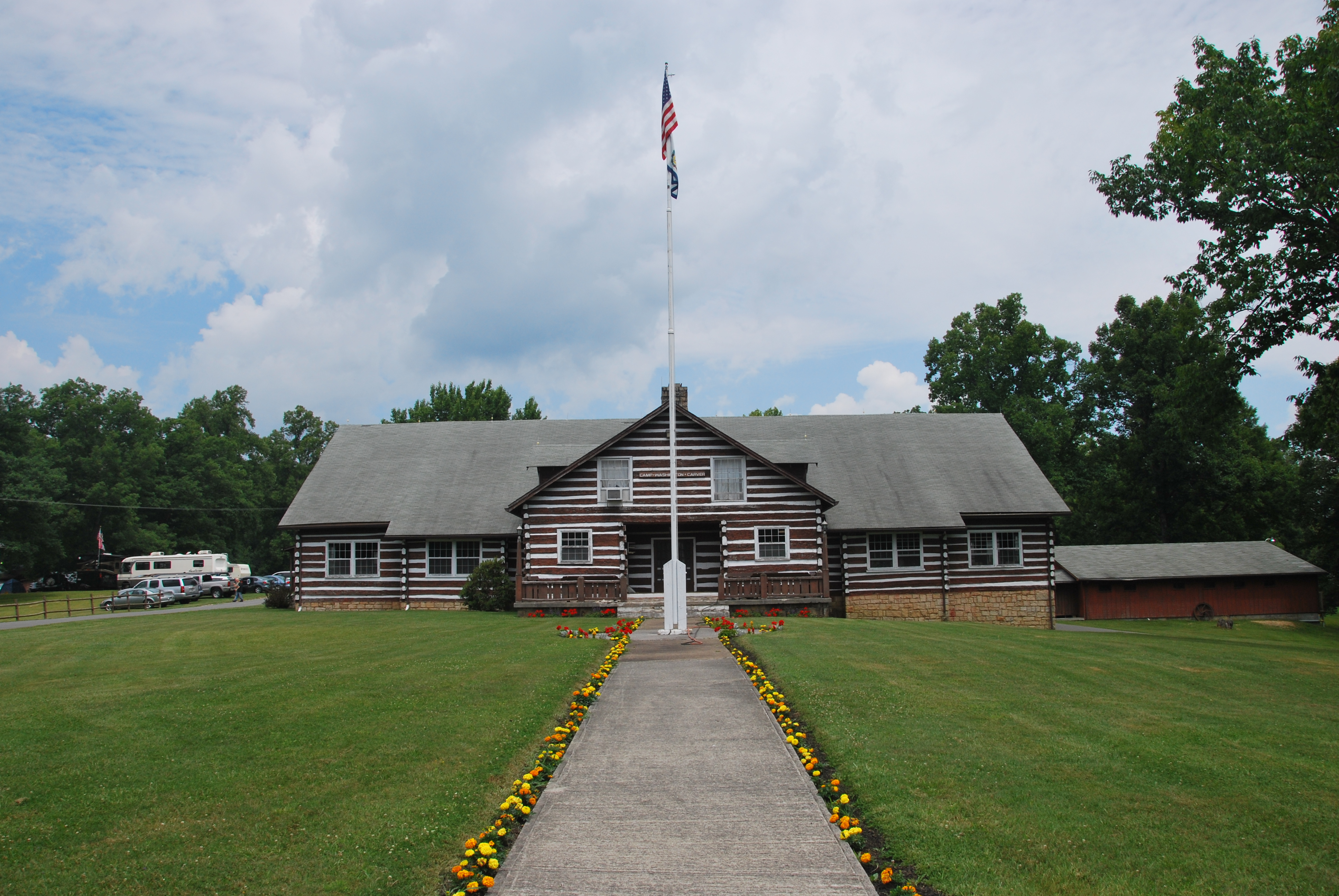
Great Chestnut Lodge, Camp Washington-Carver Complex

Under Davis' leadership in the 1930s, West Virginia State College and its Extension Service were part of a movement to provide educational outdoor and recreational activities for West Virginia's African American youth. This movement received West Virginia Board of Control funding from the Works Progress Administration (WPA) when the West Virginia Legislature established Camp Washington-Carver in 1937 near Clifftop in Fayette County. The 583-acre (236 ha) African American 4-H camp was constructed by the WPA between 1939 and 1942 and under Davis' leadership. The camp was transferred from the West Virginia Board of Control to West Virginia State's Extension Service in 1942. Camp Washington-Carver was formally dedicated on July 26, 1942 in a ceremony attended by Davis. At the 4-H camp, West Virginia State's Extension Service offered instruction to African American children and adolescents in the subjects of agricultural education, soil conservation, home economics, and 4-H values. Later in 1949, the West Virginia Conservation Commission consulted Davis on the name for a state recreational area for African Americans near Institute, and following his recommendation, the Conservation Commission selected the name, Booker T. Washington State Park.

=== Civilian Pilot Training Program ===
Davis began pursuing a pilot training program for West Virginia State in 1934 through a cooperative relationship between the college's vocational program and officials at nearby Wertz Field, adjacent to the campus. Following the outbreak of World War II in 1939, the United States government recognized a shortage of trained pilots. To mitigate this shortage, its Civil Aeronautics Authority (CAA) established the Civilian Pilot Training Program (CPTP) with the intention of creating pilot training programs at U.S. colleges and universities. According to West Virginia State's Dr. Charles Ledbetter, only 20 African Americans in the U.S. were licensed as pilots at the time of the CPTP's establishment. On September 11, 1939, Davis received approval from the CAA to establish a CPTP at West Virginia State—the first African American college in the U.S. to do so. Its CPTP was announced on September 18, along with that of the Agricultural and Technical College of North Carolina. West Virginia State's CPTP conducted flight instruction at nearby Wertz Field. In October 1939, Davis coordinated with the National Youth Administration to secure a mechanic work experience project as part of West Virginia State's CPTP.

One of the college's CPTP instructors, Dr. Charles Byrd, noted that West Virginia State's CPTP "played a part in the struggle to get African Americans accepted" into the United States Army Air Corps (USAAC). When the USAAC admitted the first African Americans and organized the 99th Flying Training Squadron, two of the first five commissioned African American pilots were graduates from West Virginia State's CPTP: George Spencer Roberts, the first African American appointed to the USAAC and Mac Ross. Another of the college's CPTP graduates was Rose Agnes Rolls of Fairmont, West Virginia, the first African American woman to receive flight training through the CAA and the first female solo pilot in the CPTP nationwide. Rolls and Joseph Greider, a West Virginia State music professor, later joined the West Virginia Civil Air Patrol, becoming the first African Americans in the state's air patrol. In the summer of 1940, West Virginia State became the first African American college to enroll white trainees into its CPTP. This served as a precedent for the racial integration of the United States Armed Forces. West Virginia State's CPTP was discontinued in 1942.

=== Army Specialized Training Program ===
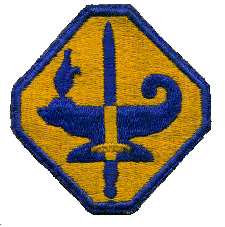
Insignia of the Army Specialized Training Program (ASTP)

Also under Davis' leadership, West Virginia State received an Army Specialized Training Program (ASTP) unit. He was persistent in conveying the college's desire to have ASTP trainees on its campus. Davis had read about the ASTP in newspapers and in School and Safety, the American Council on Education's weekly newsletter, and he sent a letter on June 16, 1943 to the ASTP Director, United States Army Colonel Herman Beukema. Beukema responded by stating that the ASTP was using Howard University, Prairie View State College, and Agricultural and Technical College of North Carolina, which met current demands. He added that the army planned to give the college "an Army Specialized Training Unit at the earliest possible date."

Davis was only made aware that West Virginia State was receiving an ASTP unit two weeks before ASTP personnel arrived on its campus. On July 16, 1943, Colonel W. G. Johnston of the Army Service Forces' Fifth Service Command called Davis to inform him, and two days later, Johnston confirmed the tentative number of ASTP trainees, arrival date, and basic engineering courses to be offered, and that a contract "negotiating party" would soon visit the campus. Within a week's time, West Virginia State reached agreements with the Fifth Service Command, and Davis commenced modifications to the college's Gore Hall, where most of the ASTP personnel were housed. On July 22, 1943, Davis wrote to Johnston, requesting him to expand the anticipated total of 150 trainees to 300, an amount that included 17-year-old West Virginia reservists who were to attend ASTP training at other colleges and universities. In this letter, Davis assured Johnston, "the entire force of this college ... is now busy preparing for the arrival of AST trainees."

=== Nonpartisan leadership style ===
Throughout his tenure as president of West Virginia State, Davis was able to govern the college with a surprising degree of independence and political nonpartisanship, despite its proximity to the state capitol in nearby Charleston. In a 1944 meeting of the West Virginia State faculty, Davis explained his disinterest in partisan politics to the college's faculty: "I have never felt it my duty to go and dabble in partisan politics. I hold the position that I have a unique place in the life of the state. You and I are to cooperate in guiding this school, that whatever party is in power, the success of the institution can be a credit to that party." However, Davis advocated the college's advancement in all matters in his correspondences with West Virginia state legislators and officials. He also leveraged his faculty as a resource for providing expertise and assistance to state politicians, regardless of their party. When a West Virginia state senator expressed an interest in having German papers translated, Davis recommended a West Virginia State faculty member to perform this task, and he assured the senator that the professor would remain "quiet" about their assistance. Davis believed that assistance provided by West Virginia State would be returned in the form of appropriations. Author Gerald L. Smith cited Davis' nonpartisan leadership style as being an influence on Rufus B. Atwood, president of Kentucky State College. Davis was also able to secure appropriations for the West Virginia State's buildings and equipment because the state's Democratic and Republican parties both vied for African American votes.

== Associated Publishers, Inc. ==
In June 1921, Davis and African American leaders including Carter G. Woodson, Don S.S. Goodloe, Mordecai Wyatt Johnson, and Byrd Prillerman, established Associated Publishers, Inc., in Washington, D.C., with a capital stock of $25,000. Davis and his fellow incorporators founded the firm after recognizing the need of "supplanting exploiting publishers" and to focus primarily on works by African American authors and on issues concerning the African American community. Davis served as the publishing firm's treasurer and Woodson served as its president.

== United States Government service ==
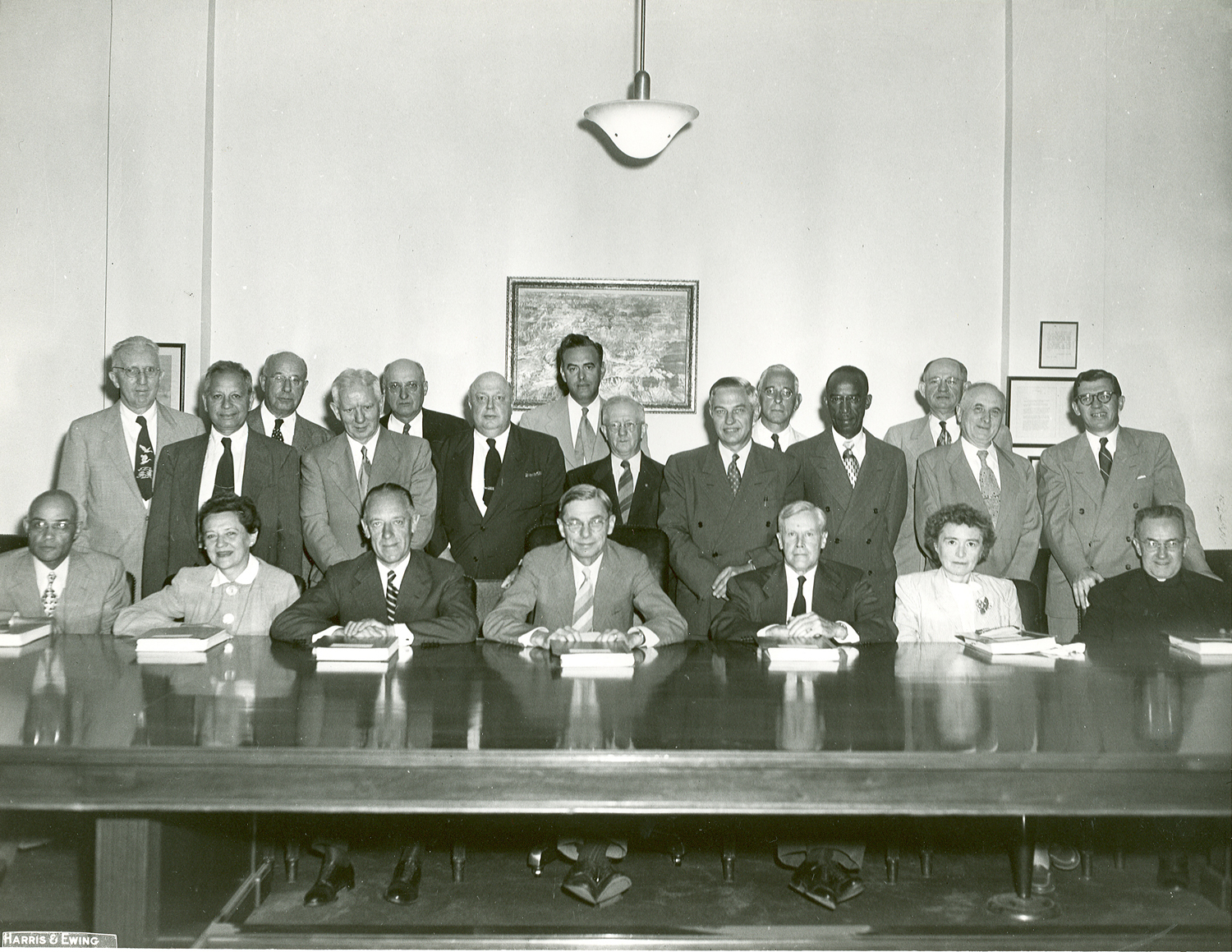
National Science Board Members, July 1951. Davis is in the first row on the left.

Throughout his lifetime, Davis was an adviser to five United States presidents, and he served in multiple roles in support of the United States federal government. He served as a member of the National Advisory Committee on Education of Negroes in 1929 and again from 1948 to 1951. In 1931, Davis was appointed a member of the President's Organization for Unemployment Relief under President Herbert Hoover. At the invitation of United States Secretary of State Cordell Hull, Davis participated in a conference on Inter-American relations in November 1939. In August 1941, Davis accepted an invitation from U.S. Treasury Secretary Henry Morgenthau Jr. to serve on West Virginia's Defense Savings Committee, which was responsible for promoting the purchase of savings bonds to finance national defense efforts. Following the passage of the National Science Foundation Act of 1950, President Harry S. Truman appointed Davis as a charter member to the first National Science Board for the National Science Foundation, on which he served from 1950 to 1956. Davis was also chairperson of the National Commission for the Defense of Democracy through Education.

In his final year as president of West Virginia State, Davis took a permanent leave of absence to embark on a career in foreign service. President Truman appointed him to serve, under the first African American United States Ambassador Edward R. Dudley, as the director of the Technical Cooperation Administration program in Liberia from 1952 to 1954. Davis served as a consultant to the Peace Corps in 1961, and as a consultant on minority hiring to the United States Department of State's United States Information Agency.

== Civil Rights Movement ==
Davis was among the vanguard of the American Civil Rights Movement. He was active in the National Urban League and served on its executive board. Davis also advised George Edmund Haynes and Eugene Kinckle Jones on the league's development. In 1928, he served as the president of the National Association of Teachers in Colored Schools (later known as the American Teachers Association). While Davis had not sought this leadership position, his peers believed he had the necessary leadership qualities to head the association during a pivotal time in African American education. In 1934, Davis wrote a pamphlet entitled, "Land-Grant Colleges for Negroes," for the West Virginia State College Bulletin and continued to expand this article into a book. He died in 1980 before it could be published.

Davis helped to establish the NAACP Legal Defense and Educational Fund (NAACP LDF), and he was elected to serve on its board of directors, two days after its inception in 1939. After accepting an invitation by Thurgood Marshall in 1955, Davis served as the special director of the NAACP LDF Teacher Information and Security Program, which he established to preserve the positions of African American educators. While at the NAACP LDF, Davis worked closely with Marshall, the fund's Chief Counsel, to prepare for the Brown v. Board of Education case. This case resulted in the landmark decision of the U.S. Supreme Court that U.S. state laws establishing racial segregation in public schools are unconstitutional, even if the segregated schools are otherwise equal in quality.

In his role as the special director of the NAACP LDF Teacher Information and Security Program, Davis fought for the protection of African American teachers, and for communities making the transition into integrated schools. Davis administered the NAACP LDF's scholarship programs for African American undergraduate, graduate, and professional students. During his 24 years in this role, the NAACP LDF provided more than 1,300 scholarships and grants to African American students. In 1964, Davis became the special director for the Herbert Lehman Educational Fund. He later became a consultant to the NAACP LDF in 1972 and served in this position until his death in 1980.

Davis was a close friend of Mary McLeod Bethune, founder of the National Council of Negro Women. He accompanied her on her first visit to the White House for her presentation on the problems facing African Americans to President Franklin D. Roosevelt.

== Later life and death ==
Davis and his wife relocated to Englewood, New Jersey, in 1954 following his departure from West Virginia State. In 1960, Davis was appointed to the United States National Commission for the United Nations Educational, Scientific and Cultural Organization (UNESCO).

He became a member of the Bergen County College board of trustees, and at the college's first annual commencement exercise in 1970, Davis delivered a speech against the Vietnam War in which he stated, "More than 42,000 young men of this nation have died in an undeclared war. No nation will win the Vietnam War and our continued participation in this war will weaken the vitality of America and destroy its substance." In his speech, Davis also challenged the graduates to, "Bring our peoples together, black and white, and repair the cracked Liberty Bell so that it can clearly and loudly proclaim liberty throughout the land."

In May 1973, Davis delivered the graduation commencement address at West Virginia State College, in which he told graduates that it was up to them to see that no more Watergates occur. Davis attended the first Seminar on Black Colleges and Universities in Nashville in November 1979 and participated in its study group to discuss the future missions of black colleges and universities.

Davis continued to work as an active consultant for the NAACP LDF and serve as the head of its Herbert Lehmann Fund until his death. He died of a heart attack at the age of 92 at his home in Englewood on July 12, 1980. A memorial service for Davis was held on July 18, 1980 at the First Baptist Church in Englewood. At the time of his death, Davis was engaged in a survey of all the United States African American land-grant colleges and universities.

== Personal life ==
=== Marriages and children ===
In 1916, Davis married Bessie Rucker (born July 13, 1890), the daughter of Georgia politician Henry Allan Rucker (1852–1924) and his wife, Annie Long Rucker (1865–1933). Rucker's father served as head of revenue collection in Georgia during the Reconstruction era, and her maternal grandfather, Jefferson F. Long (1836–1901), was Georgia's first African American congressperson in the U.S. House of Representatives. Davis and his first wife Bessie had two daughters: Constance Rucker Davis Welch and Dorothy Long Davis McDaniel.

Following several months of illness, Bessie Rucker Davis died of hepatocellular carcinoma on February 24, 1931 at Mountain State Hospital in Charleston at the age of 40, with her husband and sister Lucy Rucker Aiken at her bedside. Davis, his daughters Constance and Dorothy, and numerous friends and faculty from West Virginia State College, traveled together to Atlanta for the memorial service. Her funeral was held at the Rucker family home in Atlanta and featured a violin solo by Kemper Harreld. Bessie Rucker Davis was interred at Atlanta's Oakland Cemetery.

On September 2, 1932, Davis married Ethel Elizabeth McGhee, an educator and activist for African American social advancement, and dean of women at Spelman College. Davis and McGhee were married in Englewood, New Jersey, after which, she resigned her position at Spelman and relocated to West Virginia State with Davis. Davis and McGhee had one daughter together: Caroline "Dash" Florence Davis Gleiter (November 19, 1933 – January 26, 2004).

=== Residences ===
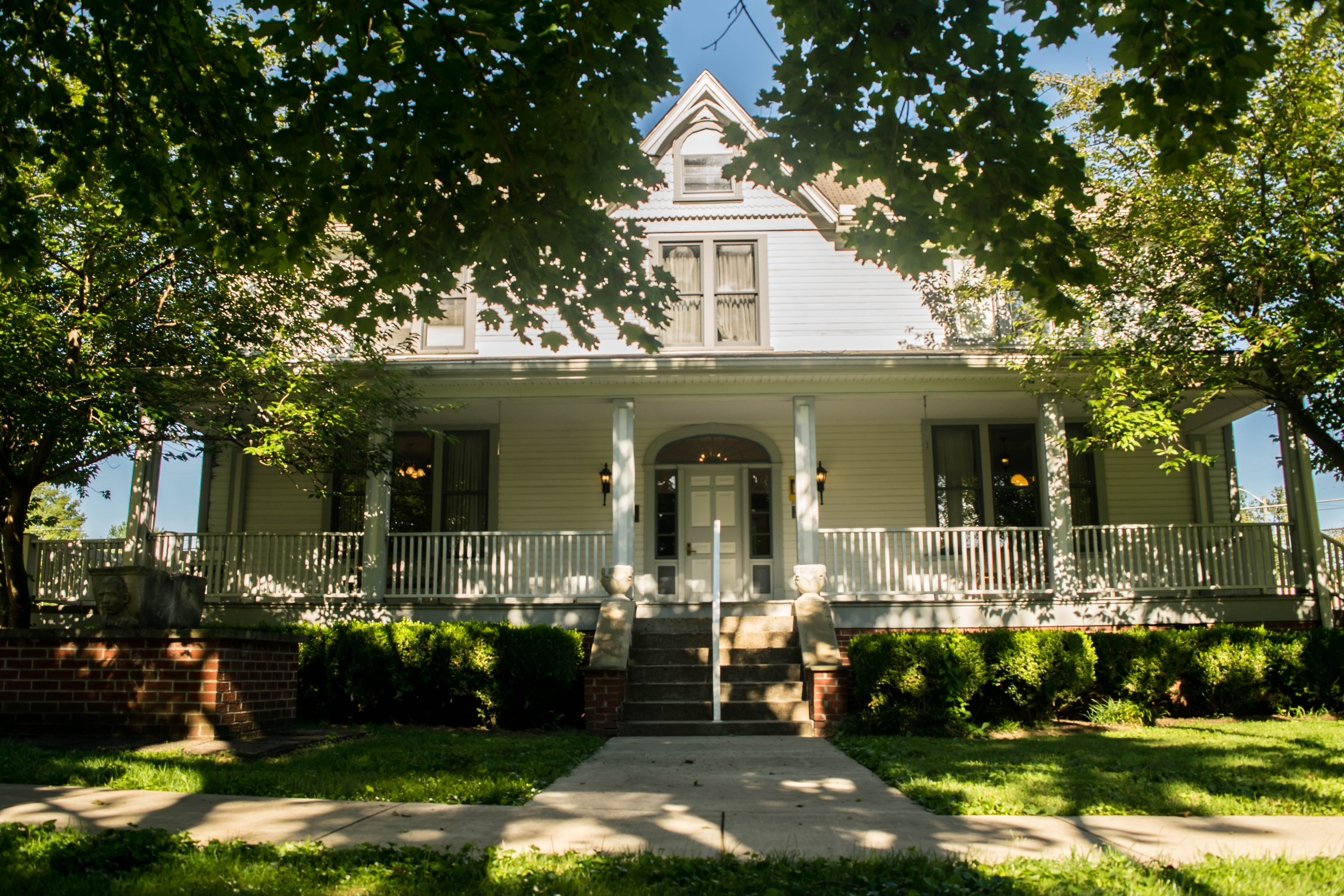
East Hall, Davis' residence at West Virginia State from 1919 until 1953

Throughout his entire 34-year tenure as president of West Virginia State, Davis resided at East Hall on the college's campus. In 1937, Davis had the house moved from the east side of campus to its current location to make room for a new physical education building. According to Davis' second wife Ethel, the couple held parties on East Hall's large porch, and Ethel held receptions for visiting dignitaries and for freshman and senior students. Guests of the Davises at East Hall included Eleanor Roosevelt, Langston Hughes, W.E.B. Du Bois, George Washington Carver, and Ralph Bunche. The Davises continued to reside at East Hall while it was being moved across campus. After relocating to Englewood, New Jersey, with his wife in 1954, Davis resided there for 26 years until his death in 1980.

== Honors and awards ==
=== Honorary degrees ===
Davis was a recipient of 14 honorary degrees, including the degrees listed below.

Year	Institution	Location	Honorary Degree
1920	Morehouse College	Atlanta, Georgia	Master of Arts (A.M.)
1931	South Carolina State College	Orangeburg, South Carolina	Doctor of Letters (D.Litt.)
1939	Wilberforce University	Wilberforce, Ohio	Doctor of Laws (LL.D.)
1940	Howard University	Washington, D.C.	Doctor of Laws (LL.D.)
1952	Virginia State College	Ettrick, Virginia	Doctor of Laws (LL.D.)
1952	Morgan State College	Baltimore, Maryland	Doctor of Laws (LL.D.)
1959	University of Liberia	Monrovia, Liberia	Doctor of Laws (LL.D.)
1965	Central State College	Wilberforce, Ohio	Doctor of Laws (LL.D.)
1965	Morehouse College	Atlanta, Georgia	Doctor of Laws (LL.D.)

Davis also received honorary doctorates from West Virginia State College and Harvard University.

=== Orders and fraternities ===
In 1948, Davis was awarded the National Order of Honour and Merit, Haiti's highest order of merit awarded by its president, for "increasing the understanding and good will existing between Haiti and the United States of America." He was awarded the Order of the Star of Africa by Liberia in 1955 for strengthening the "bonds of friendship" between Liberia and the U.S.

Davis was a member of the Sigma Pi Phi and Phi Beta Kappa honor society fraternities, and he was a 33rd Degree Mason and a Prince Hall Mason.

=== Awards ===
Davis was awarded the William E. Harmon Foundation Award for Distinguished Achievement Among Negroes for education in 1926. Just prior to his death in 1980, he was honored by the National Education Association (of which he was a member) with its Harper Council Trenholm Award.

== Legacy ==
Davis' lifelong personal and professional pursuits were focused on the economic and educational development of the African American community, the improvement of relations between African Americans and other groups, and the improvement of relations between the United States and developing black nations. With a tenure spanning 34 years, Davis is the longest-serving president of West Virginia State College, which became West Virginia State University in 2004. The university's Davis Fine Arts Building is named in his honor; he delivered the principal address at its public dedication in 1965.

Hugh M. Gloster, president of Morehouse College, hailed Davis as "one of the outstanding American leaders of the twentieth century." In Black Colleges and Universities: Challenges for the Future (1984), editor Antoine Garibaldi remarked of Davis' involvement with the book's preparation:

Even at 92, [Davis] was still progressive in his thinking and believed as strongly as any member of the group that black colleges would have to alter their missions to adapt to a changing clientele of students, changing demographics and political trends, and economic conditions that have adversely affected the financial health of most institutions of higher learning. Dr. Davis leaves a legacy for all educators to emulate. He will be missed by all those who had the good fortune to know him, but his contributions to education, to civil rights, and to the United States will live on.

== Selected works ==
- "Land-Grant Colleges for Negroes". West Virginia State College Bulletin. Institute, West Virginia: West Virginia State College. 1934. OCLC 990436113.
- "Problems in the Collegiate Education of Negroes". West Virginia State College Bulletin. 24 (4). Institute, West Virginia: West Virginia State College. 1937. OCLC 702710779.
- "The Unfinished Business of Great Teaching". The American College Bulletin. March 1950. OCLC 990504725.
- Davis, John W. (1981). "The Open Window of History". The Journal of Negro History. 66 (4). Chicago: University of Chicago Press on behalf of the Association for the Study of African American Life and History: 349–350. doi:10.2307/2717247. ISSN 0022-2992. JSTOR 2717247. S2CID 149657192.

== Bibliography ==
- Bardolph, Richard (1959). The Negro Vanguard. New York: Rinehart & Company, Inc. LCCN 59006571. OCLC 1036799256 – via Internet Archive.
- Bickley, Ancella Radford; Collins, Rodney S. (June 1988). National Register of Historic Places Inventory – Nomination Form: East Hall (PDF). United States Department of the Interior, National Park Service. Archived from the original (PDF) on March 2, 2020.
- Collins, Rodney S.; Turley, C. E. (April 29, 1980). National Register of Historic Places Inventory – Nomination Form: Camp Washington-Carver Complex (PDF). United States Department of the Interior, National Park Service. Archived from the original (PDF) on December 9, 2017.
- Davis, John W., ed. (October 1919). "President John W. Davis" (PDF). The Institute Monthly. 12 (1). Institute, West Virginia: West Virginia Collegiate Institute: 2–5. Archived from the original (PDF) on October 5, 2015 – via Drain-Jordan Library, West Virginia State University.
- Garibaldi, Antoine M., ed. (1984). Black Colleges and Universities: Challenges for the Future. New York: Praeger Publishers. ISBN 0030703026. LCCN 83022943. OCLC 1148032071 – via Internet Archive.
- Gloster, Hugh M. (1981). "John W. Davis". The Journal of Negro History. 66 (1). Chicago: University of Chicago Press on behalf of the Association for the Study of African American Life and History: 78–80. doi:10.1086/JNHv66n1p78. JSTOR 2716891. S2CID 150126200.
- Goggin, Jacqueline Anne (1993). Carter G. Woodson: A Life in Black History. Baton Rouge, Louisiana: Louisiana State University Press. ISBN 9780807117934. LCCN 92035980. OCLC 45843468 – via Internet Archive.
- Greenberg, Jack (1994). Crusaders in the Courts: How a Dedicated Band of Lawyers Fought for the Civil Rights Revolution. New York: Basic Books. ISBN 9780465015184. LCCN 93045972. OCLC 623122480 – via Internet Archive.
- Haskins, James (2000). Carter G. Woodson. Brookfield, Connecticut: Millbrook Press. ISBN 9780761312642. LCCN 98053912. OCLC 1029281975 – via Internet Archive.
- Jones, James McHenry (1904). "The West Virginia Colored Institute". History of Education in West Virginia. Charleston, West Virginia: The Tribune Printing Company: 285–290. LCCN 05015334. OCLC 578625700 – via Internet Archive.
- Keefer, Louis E. (1994). "On the Homefront in World War II: Soldier-Scholars at West Virginia State College". West Virginia History. 53. Charleston, West Virginia: West Virginia Archives and History: 119–132. Archived from the original on March 1, 2020.
- Moorland–Spingarn Research Center Staff (October 1, 2015). Davis, John Warren. Washington, D.C.: Howard University. Archived from the original on April 13, 2020.
- Morehouse College (1917). Annual Catalogue of Morehouse College 1916–1917. Atlanta: Foote & Davies Company Printers, under the auspices of the American Baptist Home Mission Society. OCLC 910491518. Archived from the original on April 12, 2020 – via Internet Archive.
- Morehouse College (1921). Annual Catalogue of Morehouse College 1920–1921. Atlanta: Foote & Davies Company Printers, under the auspices of the American Baptist Home Mission Society. OCLC 910491518. Archived from the original on February 1, 2015 – via Internet Archive.
- National Science Board (2001). The National Science Board – A History in Highlights 1950–2000 (PDF). Arlington, Virginia: National Science Board. OCLC 831714639. Archived from the original (PDF) on April 11, 2020.
- National Urban League (January 1921). "Executive Board". Bulletin of the National Urban League. X (1). New York: National Urban League. OCLC 13077432. Archived from the original on April 12, 2020 – via Internet Archive.
- O'Brien, William E. (2016). Landscapes of Exclusion: State Parks and Jim Crow in the American South. Amherst, Massachusetts: University of Massachusetts Press. ISBN 978-1-61376-360-5. OCLC 973123431 – via Internet Archive.
- Robinson, Wilhelmena S. (1968). Historical Negro Biographies. International Library of Negro Life and History. New York: Publishers Company, Inc., under the auspices of the Association for the Study of Negro Life and History. ISBN 9780877812036. LCCN 68002920. OCLC 1035607110 – via Internet Archive.
- Shabazz, Amilcar (2004). Advancing Democracy: African Americans and the Struggle for Access and Equity in Higher Education in Texas. Chapel Hill, North Carolina: University of North Carolina Press. ISBN 9780807828335. LCCN 2003012091. OCLC 62312861 – via Internet Archive.
- Smith, Gerald L. (1994). A Black Educator in the Segregated South. Lexington, Kentucky: University Press of Kentucky. ISBN 9780813118567. LCCN 93005993. OCLC 622296614 – via Internet Archive.
- Trent, William Woodson (1960). Mountaineer Education: A Story of Education in West Virginia 1885–1957. OCLC 958486310. Archived from the original on March 1, 2020 – via West Virginia Archives and History.
- Wesley, Charles H. (1981). "John W. Davis". The Journal of Negro History. 66 (1). Chicago: University of Chicago Press on behalf of the Association for the Study of African American Life and History: 76–78. doi:10.1086/JNHv66n1p76. JSTOR 2716890. S2CID 150352747.
- West Virginia Department of Education (1922). Biennial Report of the State Supervisor of Negro Schools of West Virginia for the Two Years Ending June 30, 1922. Charleston, West Virginia: Tribune Printing Company. LCCN 45050967. OCLC 1041611348. Archived from the original on March 1, 2020 – via Internet Archive.
- Woodson, Carter G. (July 1921). "Notes". The Journal of Negro History. 6 (3). Washington, D.C.: Association for the Study of Negro Life and History: 380–381. doi:10.1086/JNHv6n3p380. S2CID 224835460 – via Internet Archive.
- Woodson, Carter G. (January 1922). "Early Negro Education in West Virginia". The Journal of Negro History. 7 (1). Washington, D.C.: Association for the Study of Negro Life and History: 23–63. doi:10.2307/2713579. hdl:2027/osu.32435074353632. JSTOR 2713579 – via Internet Archive.
- Woodson, Carter G. (2000). Conyers, James L. Jr. (ed.). Carter G. Woodson: A Historical Reader. New York: Garland Publishing, Inc. ISBN 9780815332701. LCCN 99016589. OCLC 1148191420 – via Internet Archive.
