= List of titles and honours of Haile Selassie =

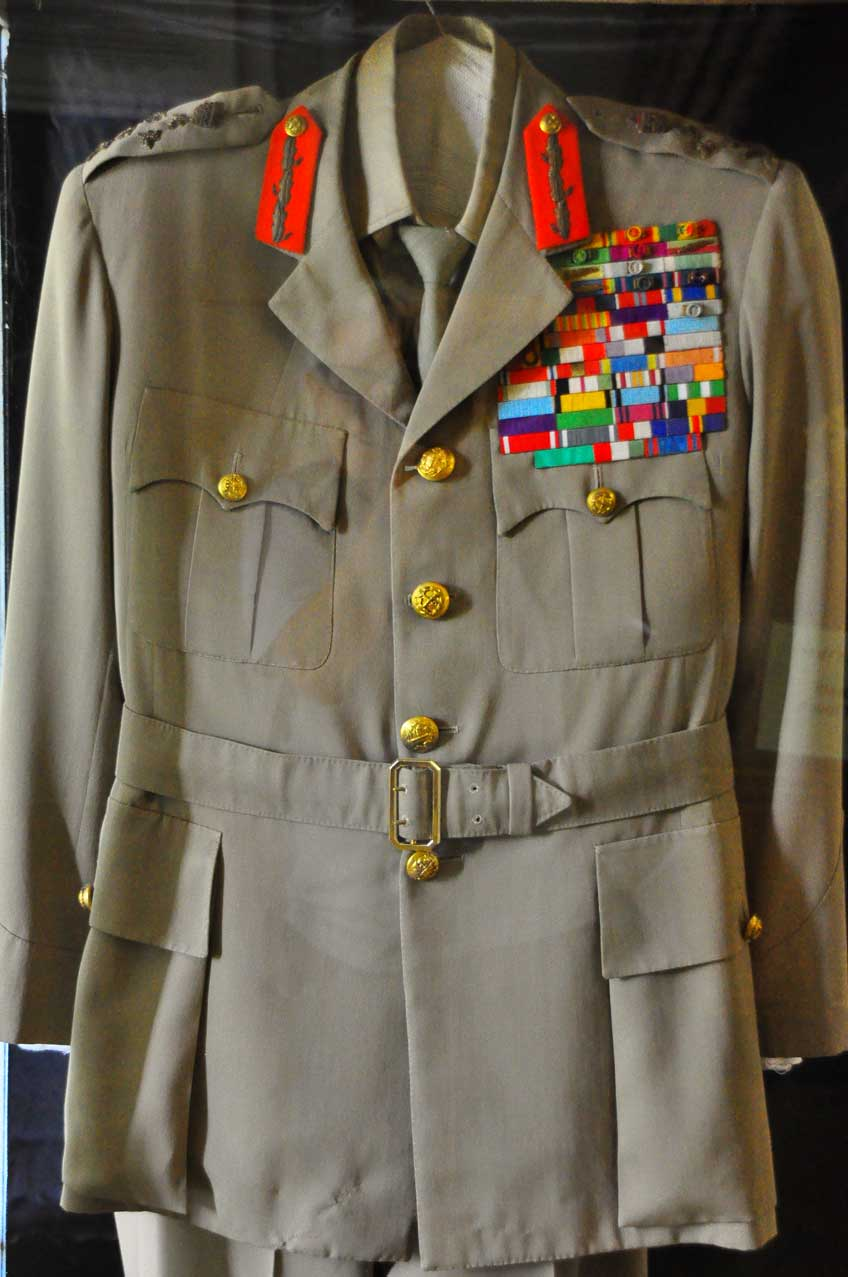
Haile Selassie's service dress uniform, showing 14 rows of ribbons of some of his decorations.

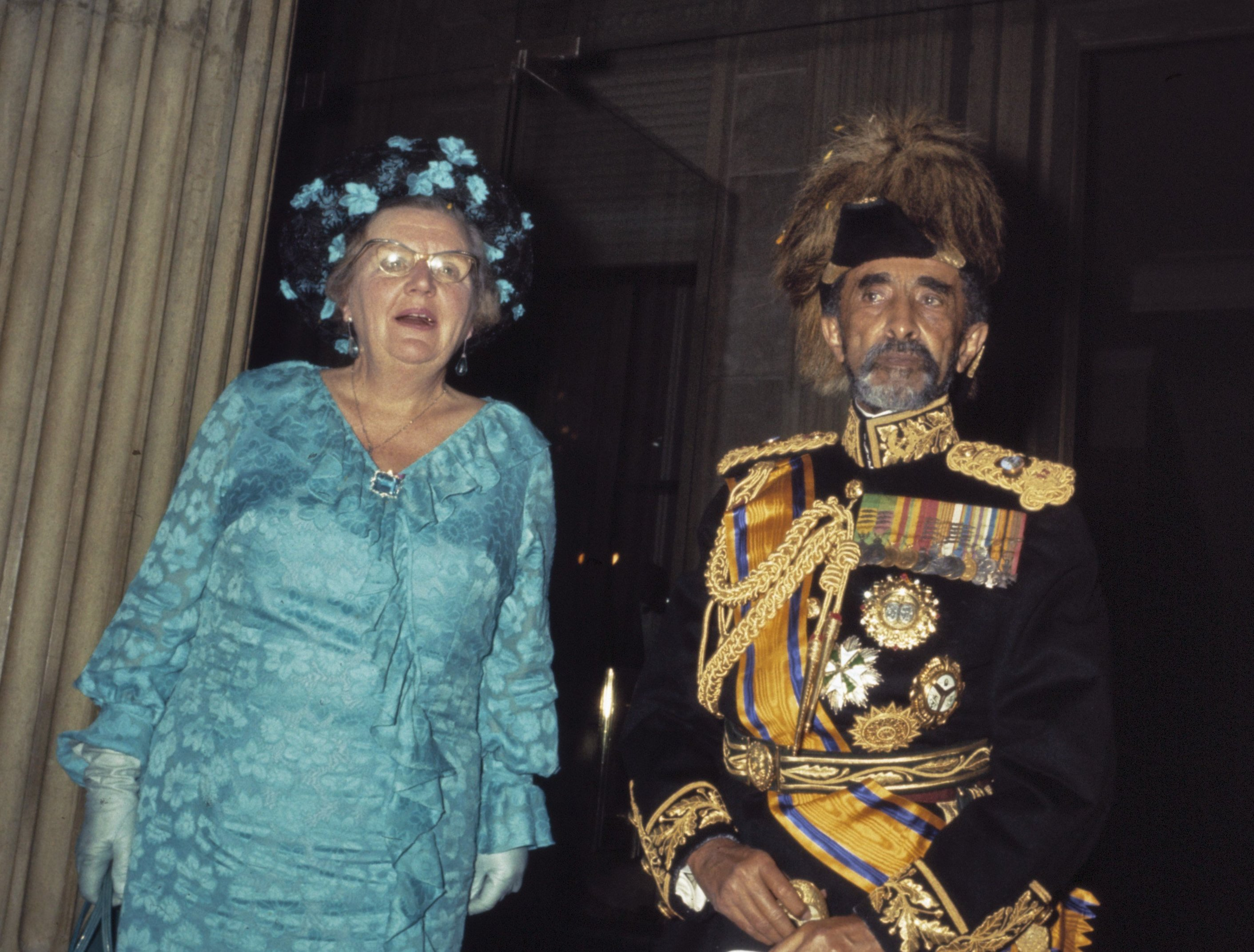
Haile Selassie with Queen Juliana of the Netherlands in 1969, wearing the insignia of the Military William Order.

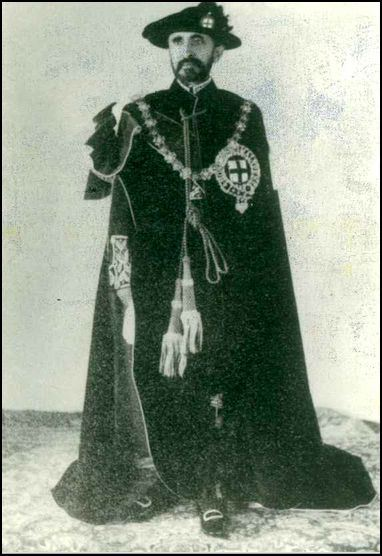
Haile Selassie wearing the regalia of a Knight Companion of the Garter. He was the first African to have been bestowed that order.

In his 58 years of leadership (1916–1974) in the Ethiopian Empire, first as Regent and then Emperor, Haile Selassie accumulated numerous honours and decorations both domestically and abroad. As a result of his numerous foreign visits, he was one of the most decorated personages in human history.

== Titles and styles ==
- 23 July 1892 – 1 November 1905: Lij Tafari Makonnen
- 1 November 1905 – 27 September 1916: Dejazmach Tafari Makonnen
- 27 September 1916 – 22 September 1928: Balemulu Silt'an Enderase Le'ul-Ras Tafari Makonnen
- 22 September 1928 – 3 April 1930: Negus Tafari Makonnen
- 3 April 1930 – 12 September 1974: By the Conquering Lion of the Tribe of Judah, His Imperial Majesty Haile Selassie I ("Might of the Trinity"), King of Kings, Lord of Lords, Elect of God.
- 134th Christian ruler of Ethiopia
- On 21 January 1965, H.I.M. Haile Selassie I was venerated with the title of "Defender of the Faith" by the Patriarchs of the Oriental Orthodox Churches of the World, assembled at the Conference of Addis Ababa.

== Orders and decorations ==
=== National orders ===
- Chief Commander of the Order of the Star of Ethiopia (1909)
- Grand Collar of the Order of Solomon (1930)
- Grand Cordon of the Order of the Seal of Solomon
- Grand Cordon with Collar of the Order of the Queen of Sheba
- Grand Cordon of the Order of the Holy Trinity
- Grand Cordon of the Order of Menelik II
- Order of Fidelity

=== Foreign orders ===
- Honorary Knight Grand Cross of the Order of St Michael and St George (GCMG) (United Kingdom, 1917)
- Knight Grand Cross of the Order of the Crown of Italy (Kingdom of Italy, 1917)
- Knight Grand Cross of the Order of Saints Maurice and Lazarus (Kingdom of Italy, 1924)
- Knight Grand Cross of the Order of the Redeemer (Kingdom of Greece, 1959)
- Grand Cordon with Collar of the Order of Saints George and Constantine (Kingdom of Greece)
- Grand Cordon of the Order of Leopold (Belgium, 1924)
- Grand Cross of the Order of Leopold II (Belgium)
- Honorary Knight Grand Cross of the Royal Victorian Order (GCVO) (United Kingdom, 1930)
- Honorary Knight Grand Cross of the Order of the Bath (GCB) (United Kingdom, 1924)
- Knight Grand Cross of the Order of the Gold Lion of the House of Nassau (Luxembourg, 25 May 1924)
- Grand Cross of the Legion d'Honneur (France, 1924; Grand Officer in 1918)
- Grand Cross with Collar of the Order of the Tower and Sword (Portugal, 1925)
- Knight of the Supreme Order of the Most Holy Annunciation (Kingdom of Italy, 1928)
- Collar of the Order of the Chrysanthemum (Japan, 1956; Grand Cordon in 1930)
- Grand Cordon Collar of the Royal Order of Muhammad Ali (Kingdom of Egypt, 1930; Grand Cordon on 3 May 1924)
- Knight Grand Cross of the Order of the Netherlands Lion (Netherlands, 1930)
- Knight of the Order of the White Eagle (Poland, 1930)
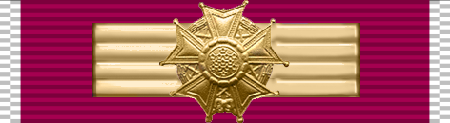
- Chief Commander of the Legion of Merit (United States, 1945)
- Grand Cross with Collar of the Order of St. Olav (Norway, 1945)
- Yugoslav Great Star (Yugoslavia, 1954)
- Grand Cross Special Class of the Order of Merit of the Federal Republic of Germany (Germany, 1954)
- Knight Grand Cross of the Military William Order (Netherlands, 3 November 1954)
- Grand Cross of the Order of the House of Orange (Netherlands)
- Stranger Knight Companion of the Order of the Garter (KG) (United Kingdom, 1954)
- Grand Cross of the National Order of the Ivory Coast (Ivory Coast)
- Knight Collar of the Order of the Elephant (RE) (Denmark, 1954)
- Knight with Collar of the Order of the Seraphim (RSerafO) (Sweden, 1954; without Collar in 1924)
- Grand Cordon Collar of the Order of the Aztec Eagle (Mexico, 1954)
- Grand Cross of the Order of Merit of the Austrian Republic (Austria, 1954)
- Grand Order of Mugunghwa with Collar of the Republic of Korea (South Korea, 1968)
- Member of the Order of Merit for National Foundation, the "Order of the Republic of Korea," 1st Class (South Korea, 1956)
- Knight Grand Cross with Collar of the Order of Merit of the Italian Republic (Italy, 1955)
- Grand Cross of the National Order of Vietnam (South Vietnam, 1958)
- Grand Commander of the Order of Truth (Burma, 1958)
- Grand Cross Collar of the Order of the Southern Cross (Brazil, 1958)
- Star of the Republic of Indonesia, 1st Class (Indonesia, 1958)
- Nishan-e-Pakistan, 1st Class (Pakistan, 1958)
- Grand Cordon of the National Order of the Republic of Burundi
- Knight of the Most Illustrious Order of the Royal House of Chakri (Thailand, 1958)
- Grand Cross Military Order of Aviz (Portugal, 1924)
- Grand Cross of the Riband of the Three Military Orders (Order Of Christ, Order of Saint Benedict of Aviz, and Order of St. James of the Sword) (Portugal, 10 August 1959)
- 1st Class of the Order of Suvorov (USSR, 1959)
- Grand Cross of the Order of the Somali Star (Somalia, 1960)
- Grand Collar of the Order of the Nile (Egypt, 22 May 1963)
- Commander of the Order of the Shield and Spears (Buganda, 1964)
- Grand Collar of the Order of Pahlavi (Iran, 1964)
- Star of the People's Republic of Romania (Romania, 1964)
- Member 1st Class with Diamonds of the Order of the Flag of the Republic of Hungary (Hungary, 1964)
- Grand Cross of the National Order of Honour and Merit (Haiti, 1966)
- Necklace of the Order of Jean-Jacques Dessalines the Great (Haiti, 1966)
- Grand Cross of the Order of Polonia Restituta (Poland, 1930)
- Honorary Recipient of the Collar of the Order of the Crown of the Realm (D.M.N.) (Malaysia, 16 August 1958)
- Companion of the Order of the Star of Ghana (CSG) (Ghana, 1970)
- Knight of the Chain Grand Cross Collar of the Order of Pius IX (Holy See, 1970)
- Knight of the Collar of the Equestrian Order of the Holy Sepulchre of Jerusalem (Holy See)
- Knight Collar of the Royal and Distinguished Spanish Order of Charles III (Spain, 27 April 1971)
- Grand Cross Collar of the Order of the Liberator General San Martín (Argentina, 1970)
- Grand Cross of the National Order of Dahomey (Benin)
- Grand Cross of the Order of the Condor of the Andes (Bolivia, 1966)
- Order of Valour (Cameroon)
- Order of Central African Merit (Central African Republic)
- Grand Cross of the National Order of Chad (Republic of Chad)
- Collar of the Order of Merit (Chile, 1966)
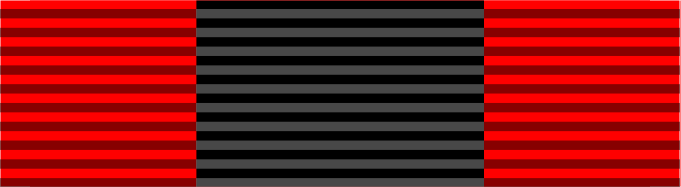
- Grand Cross of the Order of Merit (Congo)
- Order of the White Lion 1st Class with Collar (Czechoslovakia, 1954)
- Collar of the Order of the White Rose (Finland, 1949)
- Grand Cross of the Order of the Equatorial Star (Gabon)
- Grand Cross of the National Order of Merit (Guinea)
- Grand Cordon with Collar of the Order of the Hashemites (Kingdom of Iraq)
- Order of Al-Rafidan (Military Division), 1st class (Kingdom of Iraq, 1970)
- Grand Commander Order of al-Hussein bin Ali (Jordan)
- Supreme Order of the Renaissance, Knight (Jordan)
- Grand Chief Collar of the Order of the Golden Heart of Kenya (Kenya, 1966)
- Collar of the Order of the Grand Warrior of Kenya (Kenya)
- Order of Georgi Dimitrov (People's Republic of Bulgaria)
- Extraordinary Grade of the Order of Merit (Lebanon, 1950)
- Grand Cordon of the Order of the Pioneers of Liberia (Liberia)
- Collar of the Order of the Star of Africa (Liberia)
- Order of Idris I (Libya, 1956)
- Grand Cordon of the National Order of Madagascar (Madagascar)
- Order of the Lion (Malawi)
- Grand Cross of the National Order of Mali (Mali)
- Grand Cross of the National Order of Merit (Mauritania)
- Grand Collar of the Order of Muhammad (Morocco, 1962)
- Grand Cross of the National Order (Niger)
- Grand Commander of the Order of the Federal Republic (Nigeria, 1971)
- Grand Cross of the Order of the Sun of Peru (Peru, 1966)
- Raja of the Ancient Order of Sikatuna (Philippines, 1958)
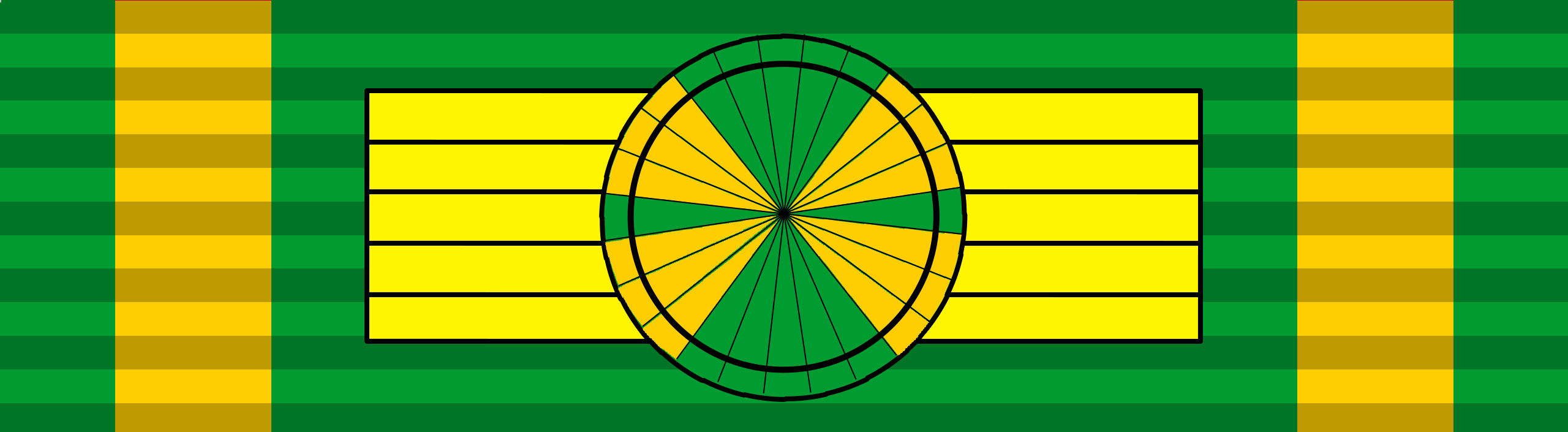
- Grand Cordon of the Order of Abdulaziz al Saud, 1st Class (Saudi Arabia, 1971)
- Grand Cross of the Order of the Lion (Senegal)
- Grand Cordon Collar of Honour (Sudan, 1970)
- Grand Cordon of the Order of Umayyad (Syria)
- Special Grade of the Order of Propitious Clouds (Republic of China)
- Grand Cross of the Order of Mono (Togo)
- Grand Collar of the Order of Independence (Tunisia, 1964)
- Grand Cross of the Royal Order of Cambodia (Cambodia)
- Grand Cordon of the Order of the Dragon of Annam (Cambodia)
- Grand Collar of the National Order of Independence (Cambodia)
- Grand Commander of the Order of the Source of the Nile (Uganda, 1972)
- Grand Cross of the National Order of Upper Volta (Republic of Upper Volta)
- Collar of the Order of the Liberator (Venezuela, 1966)
- Collar of the National Order of the Leopard (Zaire)
- Collar of the Order of the Eagle of Zambia (Zambia)
- Grand Cross Collar of the Order of the Orthodox Crusaders of the Patriarchy of Jerusalem (Greek Orthodox Church) (Kingdom of Greece)
- Grand Cordon of the Order of St. Paul (Greek Orthodox Church) (Kingdom of Greece)
- Grand Cordon of the Ecumenical Patriarch of Athenagoras Mount Athos Millennium Order (Greek Orthodox Church) (Kingdom of Greece)
- Grand Cross Collar of the Order pro Merito Melitensi, Civilian Class (Malta)
- Grand Cross of the National Order of José Matías Delgado (El Salvador)
- Medal of the Order of the Campaign for Independence (Guinea)
- Grand Cross Collar of the Order of St. Bridgette (Sweden)
- Knight of the Collar of the Equestrian Order of St. Sebastian and St. William (France)
- Grand Cross of the Order of the Church of Antioch (Turkey)
- Grand Cordon of the Order of St. Vladimir (Russian Orthodox Church) (USSR, 1959)

=== Foreign decorations and medals ===
- Croix de guerre 1939–1945 with a bronze palm (France, 1945)
- Military Medal (France, 1954)
- Medal of Military Merit 1st Class (Kingdom of Greece, 28 October 1954)
- Recipient of the Royal Victorian Chain (United Kingdom, 1930)
- Recipient of the Queen Elizabeth II Coronation Medal (United Kingdom, 2 June 1953)
- 2500th Anniversary of the founding of the Persian Empire (Iran, 14 October 1971)
- Imperial Coronation Medal of the Shah of Iran (Iran, 26 October 1967)

Other Foreign Distinctions

- Honorary Citizen of Belgrade (Yugoslavia, 1954)
- Jamaica King's House Honouree Double Medal (Jamaica, 1966)
- Honorary Citizen of the Socialist Federal Republic of Yugoslavia (Yugoslavia, 1972)
- Great Buffalo High Chief of the Native American Indians (United States, 18 June 1954)
- Grand Cross of the Order of St. Mark (Coptic Orthodox Church of Alexandria) (Egypt, 28 September 1973)
- The Great King of Malawi (Blantyre, Malawi, 3 August 1965)
- United Nations Peace Medal (UN, 5 January 1972)

== Military ranks ==
Haile Selassie held the following ranks:

- Field Marshal, Imperial Ethiopian Army
- Admiral of the Fleet, Imperial Ethiopian Navy
- Marshal of the Imperial Ethiopian Air Force

=== Foreign ranks ===
- Honorary Field Marshal, British Army, 20 January 1965

== Bibliography ==
- Anbessa, Gad. Orders and Medals of the Emperor Haile Selassie I. Editions Fitawari. ISBN 9791069964488.
- Asserate, Asfa-Wossen (2014). King of Kings: The Triumph and Tragedy of Emperor Haile Selassie I of Ethiopia. Berlin, Germany: Haus Publishing Ltd. ISBN 978-1910376140.
- Chinguwo, Paliani Gomani (October 2002). An Historical Account on 1965 Haile Selassie's Visit to Malawi; And the Crown Prince's Subsequent Visit in 1966 (PDF). Rasta Ites. Archived from the original (PDF) on 2022-08-15.
- Copley, Gregory R. (1998). Ethiopia Reaches Her Hand Unto God: Imperial Ethiopia's Unique Symbols, Structures and Role in the Modern World. Defense & Foreign Affairs, part of the International Strategic Studies Association. ISBN 1892998009.
- Ewing, William H.; Abdi, Beyene (1972). Consolidated Laws of Ethiopia Vol. I. Addis Ababa: The Faculty of Law Haile Sellassie I University.
- Kebede, Berihun (October 1, 2000). የአፄ ኃይለሥላሴ ታሪክ [History of Emperor Haile Selassie]. Addis Ababa: አርቲስቲክ ማተሚያ ቤት.
- Lee, V. (July 1983). "The Roots of Rastafari". Yoga Journal (51). ISSN 0191-0965.
- Magu, Stephen M. (2023). Towards Pan-Africanism Africa's Cooperation Through Regional Economic Communities (RECs), Ubuntu and Communitarianism. Singapore: Springer Nature Singapore.
- Marcus, Harold G. (1987). Haile Sellassie I: The Formative Years 1892–1936. London: University of California Press.
- Nathaniel, Ras (2004). 50th Anniversary of His Imperial Majesty Haile Selassie I First Visit to the United States (1954-2004). Trafford. ISBN 1412037026.
- Rey, Charles Fernand (1927). In the Country of the Blue Nile. London: Camelot Limited Press.
- Rey, Charles F. (1935). The Real Abyssinia. New York City: J. B. Lippincott Company. ISBN 0837126568.
- Selassie, Haile I (1976). My Life and Ethiopia's Progress: The Autobiography of Emperor Haile Selassie I, translated from Amharic by Edward Ullendorff. Great Britain: Oxford University Press. ISBN 0197135897.
- Steffanson, Borg G.; Starrett, Ronald K. (1976). Documents on Ethiopian Politics Vol. I: The Decline of Menelik II to the Emergence of Ras Tafari, later known as Haile Selassie, 1910 - 1919. Salisbury, North Carolina: Documentary Publications. ISBN 0897120086.
- Vestal, Theodore M. (2011). The Lion of Judah in the New World: Emperor Haile Selassie of Ethiopia and the Shaping of Americans' Attitudes Toward Africa. United States: Praeger. ISBN 9780313386206.
