= Ethel McGhee Davis =

American educator, social worker, and college administrator

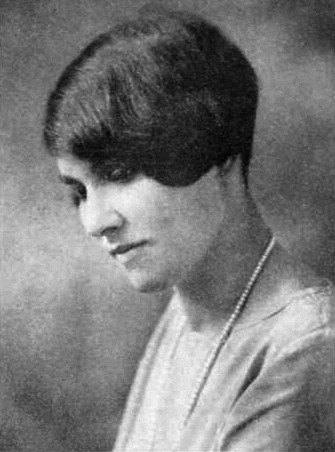
- Portrait of Davis (1928)

Student Adviser at Spelman College
- In office 1928–1931

Dean of Women at Spelman College
- In office 1931–1932

Personal details
- Born: Ethel Elizabeth McGhee; November 30, 1899 Greenville, Georgia, United States
- Died: July 13, 1990 (aged 90) Arlington, Virginia, United States
- Spouse: John Warren Davis (m. 1932; died 1980) (Note: The Legacy of the Pacesetters of Tau Omega Chapter, Alpha Kappa Alpha Sorority, Inc. (2004) lists Ethel McGhee Davis as being married prior to John Warren Davis; however, there is no evidence of this marriage and she was referred to as Miss Ethel McGhee until her marriage to Davis, after which she was regularly referred to as Mrs. John W. Davis.)
- Children: 1
- Education: Spelman College; Oberlin College; New York School of Social Work; Teachers College, Columbia University

Ethel Elizabeth McGhee Davis (November 30, 1899 – July 13, 1990) was an American educator, social worker, and college administrator. She served as the student adviser (1928–1931) and as the Dean of Women (1931–1932) for Spelman College in Atlanta.

Raised in Greenville, Georgia, Davis attended elementary and high school at Spelman College, where she graduated in 1919. She earned her Bachelor of Arts from Oberlin College in 1923 and earned her diploma in social work from the New York School of Social Work in 1925. Davis became the first African American professional social worker in Englewood, New Jersey, when she accepted the position of Director of Social Work at the Social Service Federation for Englewood's African American community in 1925.

Davis relocated to Atlanta in 1928 and served as the Senior Advisor at Spelman College, where she also taught sociology. In 1930, she accepted a fellowship from the Julius Rosenwald Fund and completed graduate work at Columbia University Teachers College, where she earned a Master of Arts in Administration and Personnel in 1931. From 1931 to 1932, Davis served as Spelman's Dean of Women, becoming the first African American administrator and the first alumna administrator at Spelman. She resigned as dean in 1932 and married John Warren Davis, president of West Virginia State College. Davis relocated to the West Virginia State campus at Institute, West Virginia, where she resided until 1953 at East Hall and, among her position as hostess and leader, she entertained distinguished visitors, such as W. E. B. Du Bois, Langston Hughes, and Eleanor Roosevelt. Following her departure from Spelman, Davis served on the college's Board of Trustees from 1940 to 1964, and she remained a Trustee Emeritus thereafter.

Throughout her adult life, Davis was engaged in a wide range of community efforts, including those for girls and women, like the Young Women's Christian Association (YWCA). She was active with the National Urban League, the National Association for the Advancement of Colored People (NAACP), and with Christian and educational organizations. Davis was a public speaker and sat on several boards of directors.

In 1954, Davis and her husband relocated to Englewood, New Jersey, where she continued to support community organizations. Davis resided in Englewood for 34 years until 1989, when she moved to Falls Church, Virginia, to live with her daughter, Caroline F. Davis Gleiter, until her death in 1990.

== Early life and education ==
Davis was born as Ethel Elizabeth McGhee on November 30, 1899, and was the daughter of Dixie Stephens. She was raised in Greenville, Georgia. Davis attended elementary school and high school at Spelman College in Atlanta for seven years, and graduated from the high school in 1919. While a student there, Davis was awarded the Chamberlin Scripture Reading Prize in 1915 and the Lucy Upton Prize for Christian Character in 1919. At her 1919 commencement, Davis read her essay entitled, "Woman's Part in Winning Prohibition".

Davis attended Oberlin College in Oberlin, Ohio, where she graduated with a Bachelor of Arts in sociology in 1923. While studying there, she taught Sunday school. Upon her graduation from Oberlin, Davis received the Ella Sachs Plotz Fellowship from the National Urban League to study social work at the New York School of Social Work (later renamed the Columbia University School of Social Work). The New York School of Social Work awarded Davis a further fellowship in 1924 because of her high qualifications, and she received a diploma from the school in 1925. While attending the New York School of Social Work, in 1924, McGhee was elected a member-at-large of the executive committee of the Young Women's Christian Association (YWCA) National Student Council.

Under the auspices of the National Urban League, Davis conducted a survey of the African American population of Morristown, New Jersey. She also worked with the Harlem Tuberculosis Association and the Harlem District of the New York Charity Organization while attending the New York School of Social Work. Davis served as the assistant house mother and parole officer at the Pennsylvania State Home for Girls at Sleighton Farm in Darling, Pennsylvania.

== Career ==
=== Social work ===
Davis became the first African American professional social worker in Englewood, New Jersey, when she accepted the position of Director of Social Work at the Social Service Federation for Englewood's African American community in 1925. Davis served as a social worker for the Social Service Federation's Memorial House, where she directed girls' clubs and activities. She had previously performed field work at Memorial House while studying at the New York School of Social Work. While in Englewood, Davis worked to improve race relations in the city. Due to her work performance and resulting reputation, she received job offers from the New York Urban League, the national YWCA headquarters, and two local YWCA branches.

=== Spelman College ===
Davis was employed as Student Adviser at Spelman College in Atlanta, beginning in September 1928. In addition to serving as Senior Advisor, Davis taught sociology. She was granted a one-year leave of absence from Spelman in 1930, and accepted a fellowship from the Julius Rosenwald Fund to complete graduate work at Columbia University Teachers College. Davis returned to New York and earned a Master of Arts in Administration and Personnel at Columbia University in 1931, and she was granted a diploma as an adviser of women and girls. That same year, Davis was named the Dean of Women at Spelman, becoming the college's first African American administrator and its first alumna administrator. While in New York, Davis was offered the position of Dean of Women at Talladega College; however, she declined to accept the position of Dean at Spelman. Davis served as the college's Dean of Women until 1932. She later served on the board of trustees for Spelman from 1940 to 1964, and she remained a Trustee Emeritus thereafter. She was the first alumna of Spelman to serve as a trustee for the college.

=== West Virginia State College ===
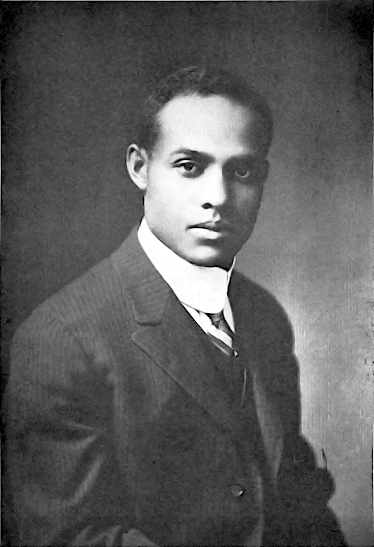
John Warren Davis

Davis married John Warren Davis, President of West Virginia State College, on September 2, 1932, in the garden of her mother's residence in Englewood. Channing Heggie Tobias, then Senior Executive of the Young Men's Christian Association (YMCA) performed the ceremony. She resigned her administrator position at Spelman just prior to her marriage, and she relocated to the West Virginia State campus in Institute, West Virginia.

At West Virginia State, Davis resided with her husband at East Hall on campus. Davis made their residence at East Hall a center for cultural and social events for students, faculty members, and distinguished visitors, which included: Mary McLeod Bethune, Ralph Bunche, George Washington Carver, W. E. B. Du Bois, Langston Hughes, Vijaya Lakshmi Pandit, and Eleanor Roosevelt. Davis hosted large parties on East Hall's porch.

Davis participated in local conferences regarding race relations, including the 1938 occupational conference held by the Charleston Women's Improvement League and the Kanawha County Council of Social Agencies, and the 1952 annual joint meeting of the YWCA and the National Council of Jewish Women, at which she served on a panel to discuss prejudice and suggestions for a cure. She also delivered presentations on race-related subjects to local organizations, including a 1935 presentation to the Women's Loyal Union, and a 1936 presentation on the "American Negro" to the First Methodist Women's Home Missionary in Charleston. Davis participated in the Book Lovers organization and provided book reviews and symposiums at her East Hall residence and at local meetings. Davis was also active in the local Charleston chapter of the National Association for the Advancement of Colored People (NAACP), and in 1933, she delivered a speech entitled "Youth and Age–Antagonist or Friend?". In 1943, Davis served as the assistant secretary for the Booker T. Washington Memorial Commission, which worked to erect a memorial to Booker T. Washington in his nearby hometown of Malden, West Virginia.

Davis regularly hosted national engagements and conferences at West Virginia State, including the June 1942 national YWCA Leadership Conference. In addition to hosting conferences at West Virginia State, Davis regularly gave presentations and speeches at educational events, including graduations. She was a Spelman College Chapel Speaker in April 1936. In 1940, she gave the commencement address at West Virginia State's Teacher Training High School graduation, and in 1951 she delivered the graduation commencement address at Bolling High School in Lewisburg, West Virginia. Following her husband's resignation from West Virginia State in 1953, Davis returned to the campus in May 1955 as the main speaker for the college's Women's Day program.

=== Liberia ===
In 1952, President Harry S. Truman appointed Davis' husband to serve under the first African American U.S. Ambassador, Edward R. Dudley, as the director of the Technical Cooperation Administration program in Liberia. The Davises arrived in Monrovia in December 1952, residing there for the duration of his tenure in 1954. While in Liberia, Davis was active with the YWCA Conference at University College Ibadan in Ibadan, Nigeria.

== Later life and organizational work ==
In 1954, Davis and her husband relocated to Englewood, New Jersey. She sat on the National Board of Directors of the Girl Scouts of the United States of America (GSUSA). Davis remained active in Englewood community affairs, where she served on the boards of: the Social Service Federation, the Urban League, the Leonard Johnson Nursery School, the Community Chest, the First Baptist Church of Englewood, the Adult School Advisory Committee, and Links, Inc. She was also a member of the League of Women Voters and the National Council of Negro Women. Davis also maintained ties with West Virginia, representing the state at the annual meeting of the Women's Committee of the International Christian University Foundation in New York in 1969. In 1981, the NAACP awarded Davis the Edward P. Dixon Award.

Davis was a charter member of the Tau Omega chapter of the Alpha Kappa Alpha sorority in 1925. She eventually transferred her Alpha Kappa Alpha membership to the sorority's Bergen County Iota Epsilon Omega graduate chapter, where she was also a charter member. In 1975, the Iota Epsilon Omega chapter honored Davis for her service to Englewood's African American community and to Memorial House, which was later known as the Englewood Community House. In her honor, the chapter donated the Hale Woodruff painting, Portal No. 1, to the Englewood Community House. In 1988, the sorority awarded Davis for her 50 years of service.

Davis resided in Englewood for 34 years until 1989 when she moved in with her daughter Caroline in Falls Church, Virginia. She died of heart disease on July 13, 1990, at Arlington Hospital in Arlington County, Virginia. Following her death, Davis' daughter Caroline remarked, "She was a woman of strong convictions, who put them softly, but held them forthrightly. She was a gentle, loving, and fun mother and friend." A memorial service was held for Davis at the Andrew Rankin Memorial Chapel on the campus of Howard University on August 4, 1990.

== Bibliography ==
- Bickley, Ancella Radford; Collins, Rodney S. (June 1988). National Register of Historic Places Inventory – Nomination Form: East Hall (PDF). United States Department of the Interior, National Park Service. Archived from the original (PDF) on March 2, 2020.
- Gloster, Hugh M. (1981). "John W. Davis". The Journal of Negro History. 66 (1). Chicago: University of Chicago Press on behalf of the Association for the Study of African American Life and History: 78–80. doi:10.1086/JNHv66n1p78. JSTOR 2716891. S2CID 150126200.
- The Hampton Normal and Agricultural Institute (June 1924). "The National Student Assembly". The Southern Workman. LIII (6). Hampton, Virginia: The Press of the Hampton Normal and Agricultural Institute: 286–287. OCLC 795130919 – via Google Books.
- Hayslette, Helen K., ed. (April 1953). "Letters". The Oberlin Alumni Magazine. 49 (4). Oberlin, Ohio: Alumni Association of Oberlin College, Inc.: 2. ISSN 0029-7518. Archived from the original on April 22, 2020.
- Holmes, Josephine Pinyon (July 1924). "Youth Cannot Wait". The Crisis. 28 (3). New York: National Association for the Advancement of Colored People: 128–131. ISSN 0011-1422. OCLC 880604625 – via Google Books.
- Robertson, Lorraine (2010). "Alumnae on Board of Trustees to Ensure Bright Future: Ten Trailblazers Committed to Serve as Spelman Launches Largest Fundraising Campaign" (PDF). Spelman Messenger. 120 (2). Atlanta: Spelman College: 20.
- Robinson, Wilhelmena S. (1968). Historical Negro Biographies. International Library of Negro Life and History. New York: Publishers Company, Inc., under the auspices of the Association for the Study of Negro Life and History. ISBN 9780877812036. LCCN 68002920. OCLC 1035607110 – via Internet Archive.
- Schulman, Daniel, ed. (2009). A Force for Change: African American Art and the Julius Rosenwald Fund. Evanston, Illinois: Northwestern University Press. ISBN 9780810125889. OCLC 259754281 – via Google Books.
- Spelman College (December 1920). "Graduates' Corner". Spelman Messenger. 37 (3). Atlanta: Spelman College: 6–7. hdl:20.500.12322/sc.001.messenger:1920.08.
- Spelman College (July 1931). "Miss McGhee Returns to Spelman College". Spelman Messenger. 47 (4). Atlanta: Spelman College: 120. Archived from the original on April 23, 2020 – via Robert W. Woodruff Library, Atlanta University Center.
- Spelman College (May 1975). "Ethel McGhee Davis Honored". Spelman Messenger. 91 (3). Atlanta: Spelman College: 23. hdl:20.500.12322/sc.001.messenger:1975.02.
- Spelman College (August 1982). "Honorary Trustee: Ethel McGhee Davis". Spelman Messenger. 27 (2). Atlanta: Spelman College: 6–7. hdl:20.500.12322/sc.001.messenger:1982.03.
- Spelman College (1929). Spelman College Catalog 1929-1930. Atlanta: Spelman College. hdl:20.500.12322/sc.001.catalog:1929.01.
- Spelman Seminary (1915). Thirty-Fourth Annual Circular of Spelman Seminary for Women and Girls in Atlanta, Ga. Atlanta: Spelman Messenger Office. ISBN 9780810125889. LCCN 2009243099. OCLC 919662587. Archived from the original on April 23, 2020 – via Internet Archive.
- Spelman Seminary (May 1919). "Beyond the Horizon". Spelman Messenger. 35 (8). Atlanta: Spelman College: 1. hdl:20.500.12322/sc.001.messenger:1919.05.
- Tau Omega Chapter, Alpha Kappa Alpha Sorority, Inc. (2004). The Legacy of the Pacesetters of Tau Omega Chapter, Alpha Kappa Alpha Sorority, Inc.: A History of Timeless Service to the Harlem Community and Beyond. Bloomington, Indiana: AuthorHouse. ISBN 9781491847084. OCLC 869905495 – via Google Books.
- Watson, Yolanda L.; Gregory, Sheila T. (2005). Daring to Educate: The Legacy of the Early Spelman College Presidents. Sterling, Virginia: Stylus. ISBN 9781579221089. LCCN 2004027299. OCLC 607697849 – via Internet Archive.
