= Joseph Boayue =

Liberian Secretary of Public Works

- Born: April 25, 1922; Bunadin, Nimba, Liberia
- Died: November 21, 1974 (aged 52); Monrovia, Liberia
- Occupations: Secretary of Public Works, Liberia, civil engineer, Under Secretary of Public Works, Chief of the Division of Highways (Public Works Department), Consulting Engineer for the Liberia Iron and Steel Corporation
- Writing career
- Notable awards: Knight Grand Commander Humane Order of African Redemption, Grand Commander, Order of the Star of Africa and Grand Band, Order of the Star of Africa, National Order of the Ivory Coast (1961), National Order of Senegal (1962), National Order of Madagascar (1962)

Joseph Whama Boayue (April 25, 1922 – November 21, 1974) was a Liberian civil engineer and Secretary of Public Works from March 8, 1961, to September 5, 1962.

== Early life ==
Joseph Whama Boayue was born on April 25, 1922, to Nya Kwai and Yhenpu Gelemein Boayue.

Boayue was sponsored by an American missionary by the name of Mildred Black and received his primary school education at the Ganta Methodist Mission School. After receiving his primary school education, Boayue was granted a scholarship to attend the Booker Washington Institute in Kakata, from which he graduated in 1942.

Following his graduation from BWI, Boayue received another scholarship to further his studies at the College of West Africa in Monrovia, where he graduated in 1946 with honors.

== Education ==
In 1949, Boayue was provided with the opportunity to work with Major Grandville Wilson, an American civil engineer employed by the Public Health Service of Liberia. This sparked Boayue's interest in civil engineering, and while working with Wilson, Boayue drew the first modern map of Monrovia.

Boayue was granted a crusade scholarship to study medicine in the United States at the advice of Dr. George Way Harley. Boayue traveled to the United States with the initial goal of studying medicine, however, his interest in civil engineering convinced him to change his study focus to civil engineering. Boayue graduated from Iowa State College on December 18, 1953, with honors.

== Professional life ==
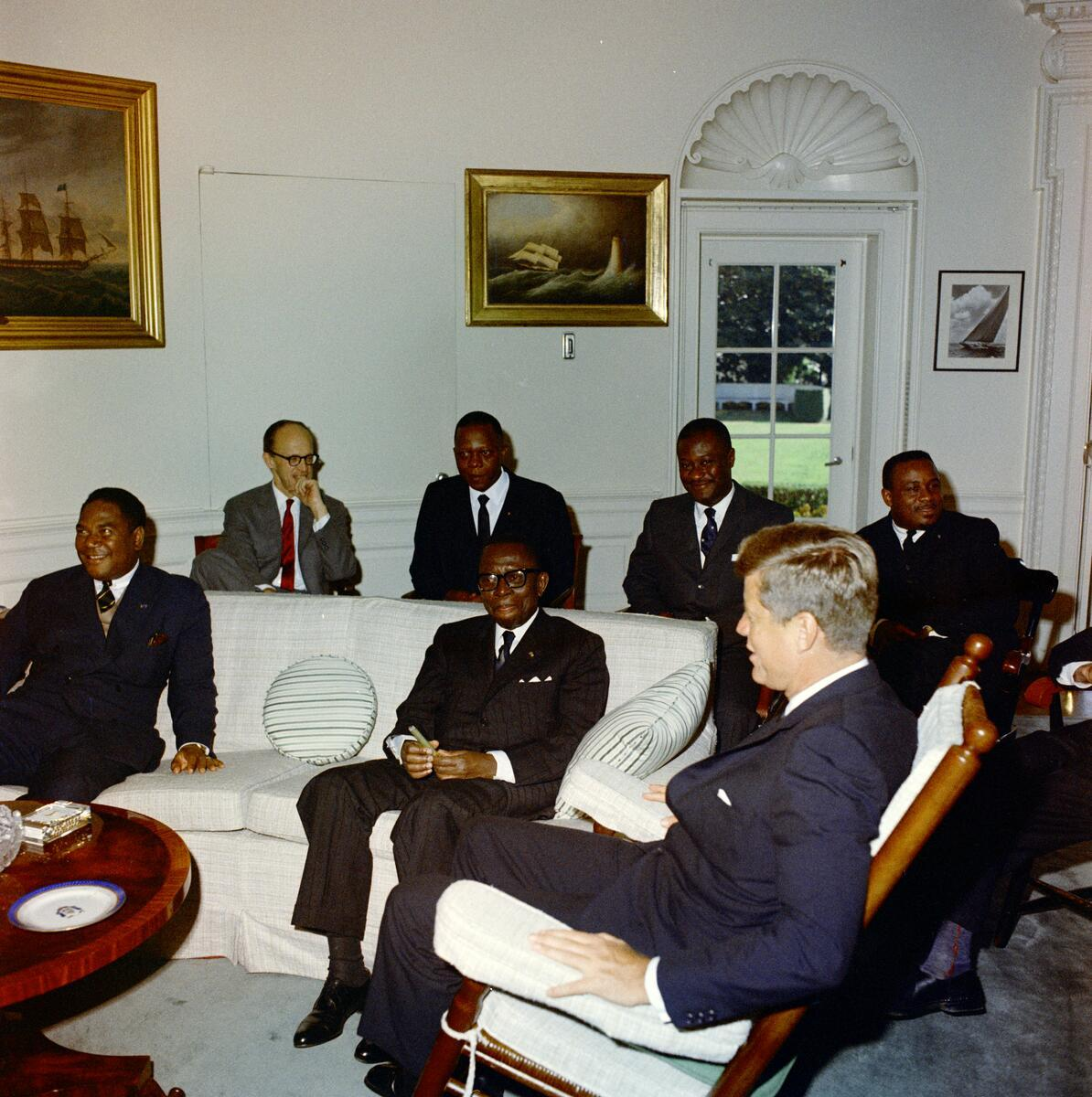
Joseph Boayue pictured in the background of a meeting between President William Tubman and President John F. Kennedy in the White House, 1961

Upon returning to Liberia after graduating, Boayue was appointed to the position of Resident Engineer at the Department of Public Works and Utilities. As a part of his job duties, Boayue was assigned to Harper, Liberia, in Maryland County. Boayue laid out the streets in Harper and oversaw the creation of a road connecting Harper and Webbo.

President William Tubman recognized Boayue's work, and on December 10, 1957, Boayue was appointed to the position of Chief of the Division of Highways of the Department of Public Works and Utilities. Boayue worked alongside then Secretary of Public Works Thomas Buchanan and represented Liberia at a variety of conferences overseas.

On January 20, 1960, Boayue was appointed to the position of Under Secretary of Public Works and Utilities. Following the death of Public Works Secretary Buchanan, Joseph Boayue was appointed to the position of Secretary of Public Works on March 8, 1961. Boayue was Liberia's first native Public Works Secretary. As Secretary of Public Works, Boayue traveled internationally with President Tubman, even accompanying Tubman to the White House for his 1961 visit with John F. Kennedy. Boayue received many awards for his service and was recognized by the Government of Liberia and the governments of Madagascar, Ivory Coast, and Senegal.

Following pressure from Americo-Liberians who took issue with a native Secretary in Tubman's cabinet, Tubman requested Boayue's resignation. Boayue resigned from the office of Secretary of Public Works on September 5, 1962.

== Personal life ==
Boayue was married to Betty Carter in 1955, and their three children were Joseph Whama Jr, Irving, and Bendu. Their marriage later came to an end. Boayue later remarried Sophie Dunbar in 1964, who was a descendant of Baptist Minister Francis Burns (minister). Their three children were Yanay Miaway, Minisiah Whama, and Zoadah Tealah.

Boayue was a member of the Poro Society, Triple "Six", and the Masonic Order of Liberia

Boayue's father was a clan chief and Boayue was of the Mano people in Liberia. Boayue was proficient in both English and the Mano language.

Boayue was the victim of a hit and run and he died on November 21, 1974, in Monrovia, Liberia. After Boayue's death, he received a military escort and his body lay in state at the Edward J. Roye Building from November 30 to December 1.
