= Humane Order of African Redemption =

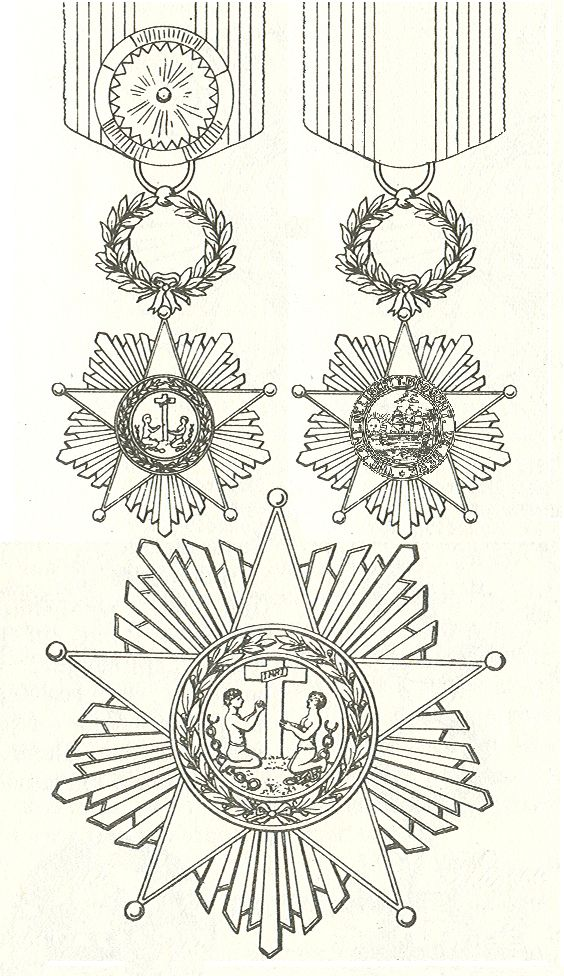
- Ribbon and stars of the Humane Order of African Redemption
- Awarded for: Humanitarian work in Liberia
- Country: Liberia
- Established: January 13, 1879
- Ribbon of the order

Precedence
- Next (lower): Order of the Pioneers of Liberia

The Humane Order of African Redemption, an order presented by the government of Liberia, was founded on January 13, 1879 during the presidency of Anthony W. Gardner. It is awarded for humanitarian work in Liberia, for acts supporting and assisting the Liberian nation and to individuals who have played a prominent role in the emancipation of African Americans and the pursuit of equal rights.

The Order replaced the older Liberian "Lone Star Medal".

The three grades of the Order are:

- Grand Commander: The Grand Commander wears a wide ribbon on the right shoulder and the star of the Order on the left.
- Knight Commander: The Knight Commander, wears a ribbon around the neck and a smaller but otherwise identical star.
- Officer: The Officer wears a narrow ribbon with rosette on the left.

== The Regalia of the Order ==
The medallion is a white enamel five pointed star with five gold balls on the points and golden rays between the arms. On the front of the star is the Coat of Arms of Liberia. On the reverse, the image of black people praying with broken chains under a cross with the motto "The love of liberty brought us here". The ribbon is red with one blue and three white stripes.

== Recipients ==
- Marian Anderson
- A. Doris Banks Henries
- Sepp Blatter
- Edward Wilmot Blyden
- Anna E. Cooper
- Varney Ebrima Dempster
- Ijoma Robert Flemister
- James Walter Flemister
- Francis Gbassagee
- Billy Graham
- Asa Grant Hilliard
- Marjon Kamara
- Jacques Paul Klein
- Ellen Margrethe Løj
- H.T. Maclin
- Francois Eugene Massaquoi
- Andre Alvin Krauss
- Gordon Mellish, missionary with Baptist Mid-Missions
- Mary Lee Mills
- Carolyn A. Miller (1976)
- Hendrik Pieter Nicolaas Muller
- Dougbeh Chris Nyan
- George Thomas Reffell
- Solomon Sipply
- David Meserve Thomas
- Alex J. Tyler
- George Toe Washington
- Arsène Wenger
- Claude Le Roy
- Cletus Wotorson
- Suraj Abdurrahman
- Kimmie Weeks
- Joseph Boayue, former Secretary of Public Works

David Morgan Williams (1979)
