= Order of the Star of Africa =

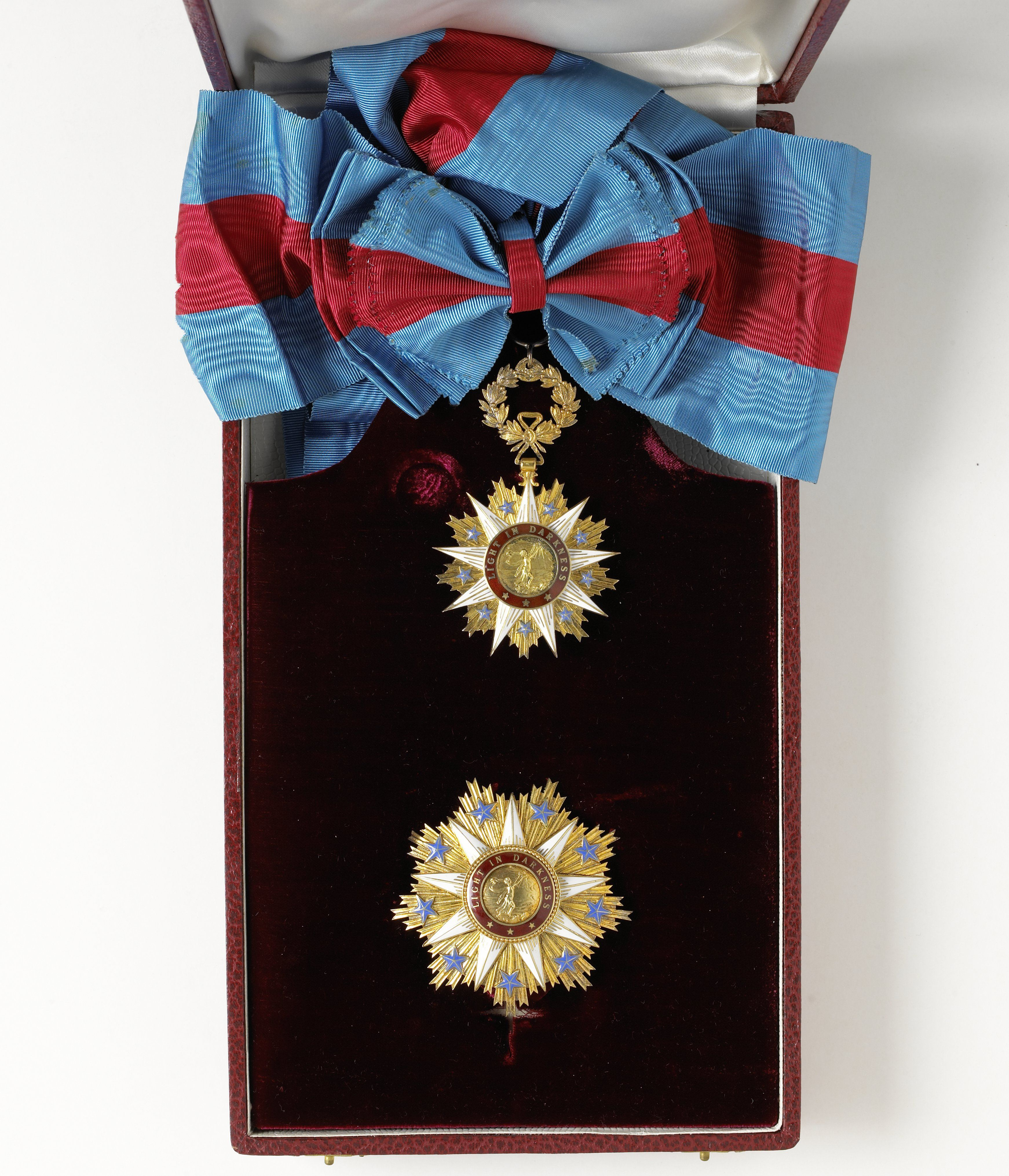
- Awarded for: Distinguished service to the Republic of Liberia or to Africa in public service or in the arts or sciences
- Country: Liberia
- Eligibility: Liberian and foreign citizens
- Established: 1920
- Ribbon of the order

Precedence
- Next (higher): Order of the Pioneers of Liberia
- Next (lower): Military Merit Order

The Order of the Star of Africa is an order presented by the government of Liberia.

== Criteria ==
The Order of the Star of Africa is presented in five grades, Knight, Officer, Grand Commander, Grand Officer, and Grand Cross. Liberian and foreign citizens may be invested with the order for distinguished service to the Republic of Liberia or to Africa in public service or in the arts and sciences.

== Appearance ==
The badge and star of the Order of the Star of Africa is a nine-pointed white enamel and silver gilded star. Between the arms of the star are gilt rays with a five-pointed pale blue star superimposed on the rays. On the obverse of the insignia, in the center, is a circular gilded medallion bearing the intertwined letters LR above the date 1920, surrounded by a pale blue enamel ring. On the ring are the gold letters The Love of Liberty Brought Us Here. The reverse of the badge is identical to the obverse except for the central medallion, which bears an allegorical female figure reaching for a shining star surrounded by a red enamel ring. The ring is inscribed in gold letters Light in Darkness.

== Recipients ==
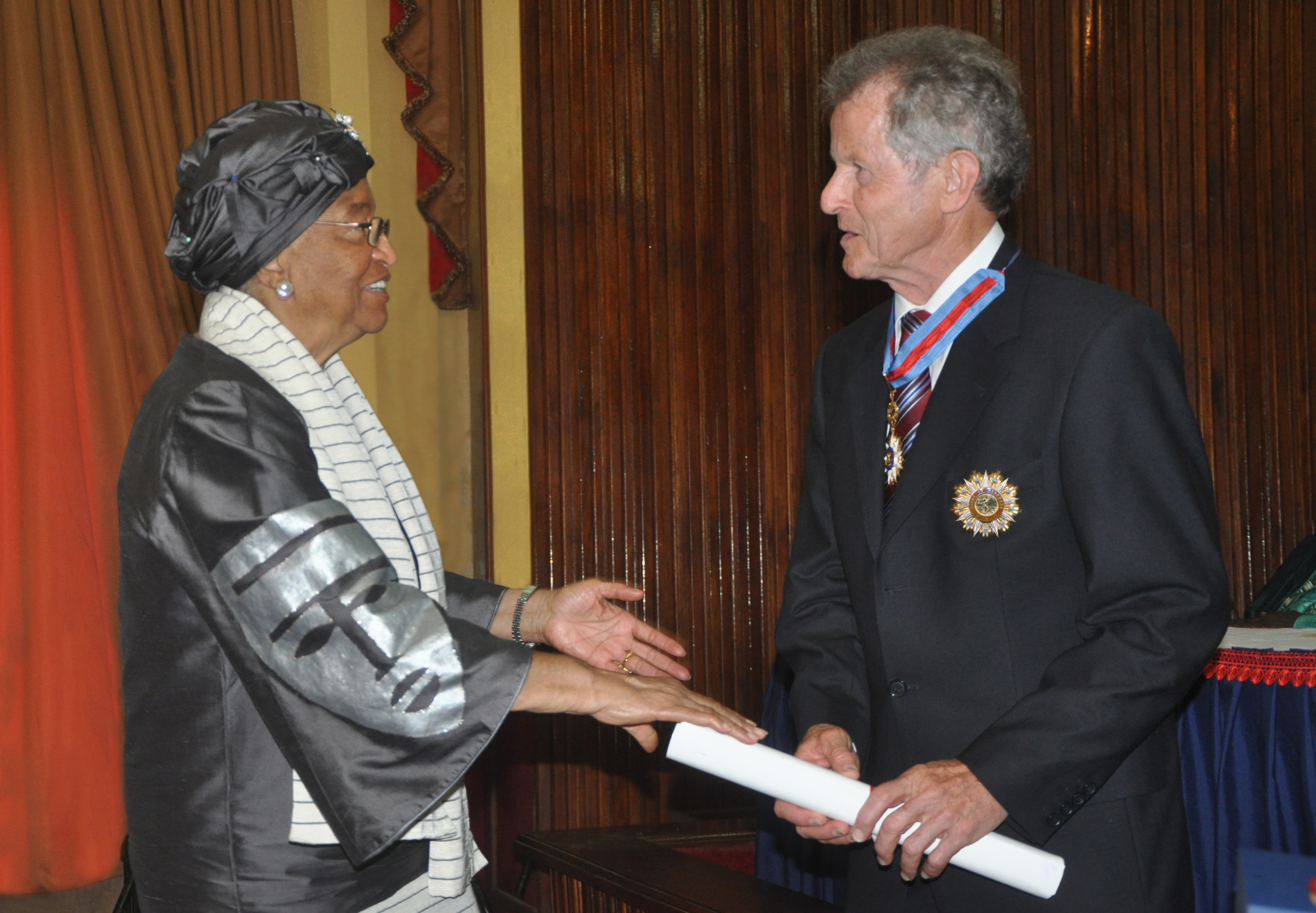
Wulf Gatter, a German environmentralist, is awarded the Order of the Star of Africa in the rank of "Grand Commander" by Liberian President Ellen Johnson Sirleaf, Monrovia, Liberia, 2016.

- Akihito
- Charles Taylor
- Gustaf Adolf Boltenstern Jr.
- Mary Broh
- Benjamin O. Davis Sr., United States Army
- John Warren Davis (college president)
- Luther H. Foster Jr.
- Piet de Jong
- Moshe Mayer
- Isaac Michaelson
- Ambassador Chigozie Obi-Nnadozie
- Salim Ahmed Salim
- Tzvi Tzur
- Ambassador George Wallace
- George Werner, former Minister of Education
- Christine A. Elder
- Yuri Gagarin

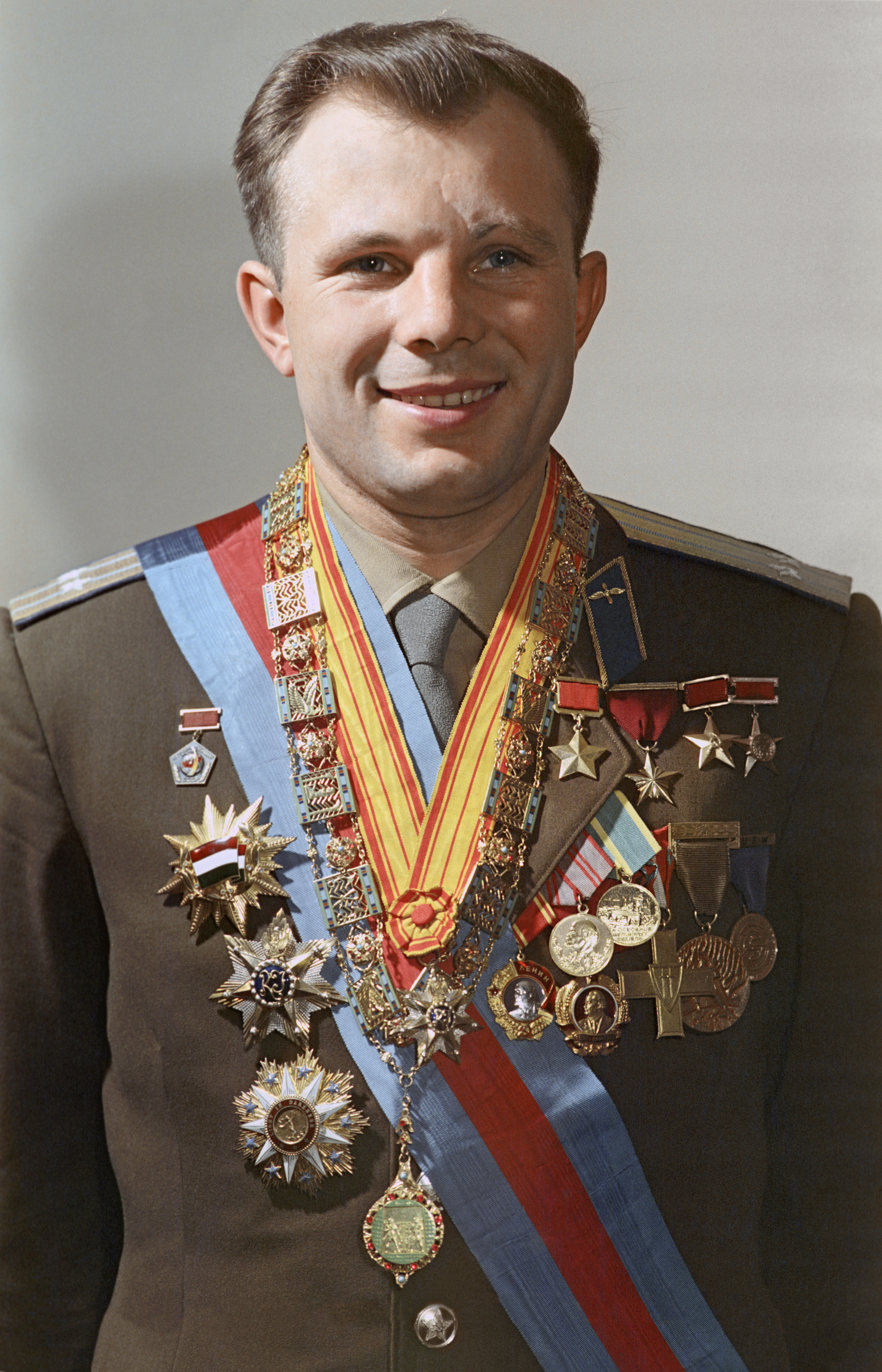
Soviet cosmonaut Yuri Gagarin wearing the sash of the Order of the Star of Africa, c. 1963

=== Knights Grand Band ===
- Elizabeth II
- Juliana of the Netherlands
- Prince Edward, Duke of Kent
- Ambassador Lorenzo Llewellyn Witherspoon
- Prince Philip, Duke of Edinburgh

=== Grand Commander ===
- Wulf Gatter, German environmentalist and ornithologist
- Fatima Massaquoi, writer and academic
- Dmytro Kuleba, Minister of Foreign Affairs of Ukraine
- Joseph Boayue, former Secretary of Public Works
- Rocheforte L. Weeks, former Minister of Foreign Affairs

=== Grand Cross ===
- Harold Alexander, 1st Earl Alexander of Tunis
