= Order of the Pioneers of Liberia =

Award by the government of Liberia

Grand Order of the Most Venerable Order of the Knighthood of the Pioneers of the Republic of Liberia
- Awarded for: Outstanding and distinguished service in international affairs, government, religion, art, science or commerce, also for singular acts of philanthropy and deeds of heroism and valor.
- Country: Liberia
- Eligibility: Liberian and foreign citizens
- Established: 1955
- Ribbon of the order

Precedence
- Next (higher): Humane Order of African Redemption
- Next (lower): Order of the Star of Africa

The Order of the Pioneers of Liberia or more formally Grand Order of the Most Venerable Order of the Knighthood of the Pioneers of the Republic of Liberia is an order presented by the government of Liberia. The order may be presented to Liberian or foreign citizens for outstanding and distinguished service in international affairs, government, religion, art, science or commerce, and also for singular acts of philanthropy and deeds of heroism and valor.

== Classes ==
The Order is presented in the following five classes:

- Grand Cordon
- Knight Commander
- Commander
- Officer
- Knight

== Recipients ==
- Bravid W. Harris
- Goodluck Jonathan
- John Kufuor
- Pat Nixon
- Hifikepunye Pohamba
- Josip Broz Tito
