= Samuel Archer =

American football player, coach, and educator (1870–1941)

Biographical details
- Born: December 23, 1870; Chesterfield, Virginia, U.S.
- Died: January 15, 1941 (aged 70); Atlanta, Georgia, U.S.

Playing career
- 1898–1901: Colgate

Coaching career (HC unless noted)
- 1905–1908: Atlanta Baptist
- 1912–1915: Atlanta Baptist / Morehouse

Head coaching record
- Overall: 35–2–5

Samuel Archer

5th President of Morehouse College
- Preceded by: John Hope
- Succeeded by: Charles D. Hubert; As acting president

Samuel Howard "Big Boy" Archer Sr. (December 23, 1870 – January 15, 1941) was an American college football player and coach and educator. He served as the head football coach at Morehouse College in Atlanta, Georgia from 1905 to 1908 and again from 1912 to 1915, compiling a record of 35–2–5.

Archer was a graduate of Colgate University, where he and George L. Hayes were the first African Americans to play for the Colgate Raiders football team in 1899.

He went on to teach mathematics at Morehouse College, and served that institution in many capacities for 33 years. He was the fifth president of Morehouse from 1931 to 1937. He died in 1941 and is buried in Atlanta's South-View Cemetery.

== Head coaching record ==
Year	Team	Overall	Conference	Standing	Bowl/playoffs
Atlanta Baptist Tigers (Independent) (1905–1908)
1905	Atlanta Baptist	4–0			
1906	Atlanta Baptist	4–0			
1907	Atlanta Baptist	5–0–1			
1908	Atlanta Baptist	7–0			
Atlanta Baptist Tigers (Independent) (1912)
1912	Atlanta Baptist	5–0			
Morehouse Maroon Tigers (Southern Intercollegiate Athletic Conference) (1913–1915)
1913	Morehouse	3–1–2			
1914	Morehouse	5–1			
1915	Morehouse	2–0–2			
Atlanta Baptist / Morehouse:		35–2–5			
Total:		35–2–5			
