= Rose Agnes Rolls Cousins =

American aviator and honorary Tuskegee Airman (1920–2006)

Rose Agnes Rolls Cousins (March 26, 1920 – July 30, 2006) was an aviator from Fairmont, West Virginia. She became the first African American woman to become a solo pilot in the Civilian Pilot Training Program.

== Early life and education ==
Rose Agnes Rolls was born on March 26, 1920, to Ann Alberta (Thornton) Rolls and Theodore Emory Rolls Sr. Growing up in Fairmont, West Virginia, Rose was introduced to flying at an early age. Visiting pilots to Fairmont would charge a dollar for a ride in their planes, and six year old Rose rode in a biplane with her father. This experience sparked a lifelong love of flying.

Rolls attended Dunbar High School, and was able to graduate early due to her academic ability. Rolls began her studies at West Virginia State College (now University) at the age of sixteen, and majored in business administration.

== Civilian Pilot Training Program ==
While attending college at West Virginia State College, the school introduced a Civilian Pilot Training Program (CPTP) in 1939. The school was one of only six historically Black secondary education institutions in the nation to establish one of these programs, which were federally funded. Rose Rolls was the only woman to join.

Initially, the director of the program, James C. Evans, was inclined to deny Rolls entry into the CPTP due to her gender. Due to her steady persistence, Evans eventually wrote several letters to government officials asking if one woman could join the program. Rolls was permitted to join, provided she could pass the same mental and physical exams as her male colleagues. She reportedly told the instructor, "I'll just put my hair up and you can pretend I'm a man."

During her training with the CPTP, Rolls learned to put the plane into a spin, land with the engine off, and fly upside down, all of which she completed successfully.

One requirement for a pilot's license under CPTP was to complete a solo cross-country flight using only compass and sights as guides. Rolls successfully flew from Fairmont to Parkersburg, West Virginia in strong winds.

Rolls received her pilot's license upon her graduation, officially becoming the first African American woman licensed under the CPTP. After her graduation, she continued to assist with the program.

== Tuskegee, Alabama ==
In 1941, the eleven graduates from West Virginia State College's pilot training program (ten male pilots and Rose Rolls) tried out for the U.S. Air Force training program for African American combat pilots in Tuskegee, Alabama. Those selected became popularly known as the Tuskegee Airmen.

During the war, Rolls faced double discrimination. She was denied entry into a combat role with the Tuskegee Airmen during World War II due to her gender. She then tried to join the Women Airforce Service Pilots (WASPs), a paramilitary aviation organization, but was rejected due to her race.

== Later life and employment ==
After being rejected from the Tuskegee Airmen, Rolls returned to Fairmont to help care for her aging parents. On December 31, 1941, she married Theodore W. Cousins from Montclair, New Jersey. The couple met during their time at West Virginia State College. They had two daughters, Emorene Nicole and Adrienne Michele. The marriage ended in 1969.

Rose faced a challenge finding employment, despite her degree and qualifications, due to her race. She taught algebra at her old high school and Bible School in Marion County, West Virginia. She then was hired as a secretary for a city director in Fairmont, the first African American to hold a position like this in Fairmont's city government. Eventually, she was employed as a manager of medical records at the Monongahela Valley Association of Health Centers (Fairmont Clinic) until her retirement in 1999.

Cousins was politically engaged and active in the community. She was a member of Marion County Democrat Women, a civil rights activist, and a lifetime member of the NAACP. She was also an adjunct lecturer and business education instructor at Fairmont State College.

Later in her life, Rose Cousins moved to her daughter's home in Washington, D.C. She died on July 30, 2006, at the age of 86, after a ten-year battle with Alzheimer's disease.

== Legacy ==
Rose Agnes Rolls Cousins remains one of West Virginia's most well-known aviators.

Rose was inducted as an honorary member of the Tuskegee Airmen in the 1980s. Her daughter cited her flight experience and her determination to break down racial and gender barriers as the motivation for this honor.
