= Beyene Abdi =

Ethiopian educator, jurist, parliamentarian, and human rights advocate

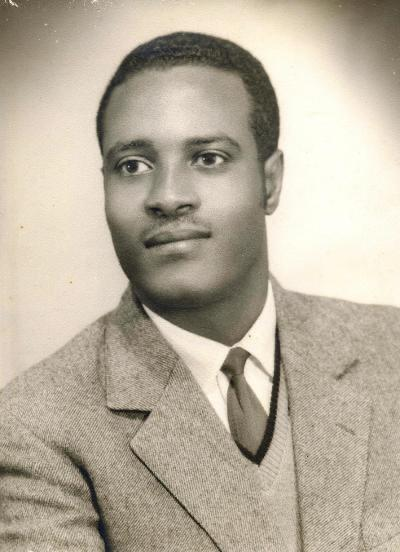
- Born: 5 May 1931 (age 95); Meendoo, Gimbii District, West Wollega, Ethiopia
- Education: Menelik II Secondary School; Haile Selassie I University
- Alma mater: Haile Selassie I University
- Occupations: Educator, Jurist, Parliamentarian, Human Rights Advocate, Author, Editor
- Known for: Consolidated Laws of Ethiopia Project; Human Rights League; Maccaa fi Tuullamaa Association; Mammaaksa fi Geerarsa Oromoo
- Notable work: Consolidated Laws of Ethiopia (editor); Mammaaksa fi Geerarsa Oromoo (author)

Beyene Abdi is an Ethiopian educator, jurist, parliamentarian, human rights advocate, Oromo civic leader, editor, and author. Over a public career spanning several decades, he served as a teacher, school administrator, Member of Parliament, legal scholar, High Court and Supreme Court judge, and civic leader. He is known for his involvement in the Maccaa fi Tuullamaa Association, the Human Rights League, Oromo-language media initiatives, and the preservation of Oromo cultural heritage through his later literary work, Mammaaksa fi Geerarsa Oromoo.

Abdi gained international attention following his arrest in the late 1990s as part of a broader crackdown on Oromo civic leaders and human rights activists. Amnesty International described him as a former judge and parliamentarian and raised concerns about his detention. His case was also discussed by the United Nations Working Group on Arbitrary Detention in relation to the detention of Human Rights League leaders and Oromo civic activists.

== Early life and education ==
Abdi was born in Meendoo, Gimbii District, West Wollega, Ethiopia, to Abdii Jammoo and Kitilee Uuggaa. His family later moved to Cuuttaa. His early life in rural Wollega was shaped by farming, livestock herding, and close ties to Oromo community life.

He began his formal education at Dejazmach Gebre Igizabeer (Kumsa Moroda) School in Gimbii and later attended Menelik II Secondary School in Addis Ababa. He completed teacher-training programs in Addis Ababa and Harar, followed by specialized training in school administration, educational leadership, and school inspection. He later studied law at Haile Selassie I University, where he earned a Diploma in Law with High Distinction and a Bachelor of Laws degree.

== Career in education ==
Abdi began his career as a teacher and later served as a school principal, educational administrator, and school inspector. Beginning as a classroom teacher in Gimbi, he quickly established a reputation for excellence. School leaders described him as sincere, hardworking, efficient, and deeply committed to student success. He taught a variety of subjects and consistently produced excellent educational outcomes. His classrooms were known for active participation, strong academic performance, and positive relationships between teacher and students. In his spare time, he reached out to the community, convincing them to send their children to school. He was involved in student activities, sports programs, school clubs, community education initiatives, and teacher development. He also served as Vice President of the Teachers' Association.

== Parliamentary service ==
During the reign of Emperor Haile Selassie, Abdi served as a Member of Parliament. Amnesty International later described him as a former parliamentarian from that period. As a representative, he carried his constituents' concerns and aspirations to the national level. He served during an important period in Ethiopia's political development and worked to ensure his people's interests were represented in national decision-making. While serving in public office, he pursued legal studies through the evening law program at Haile Selassie I University.

== Legal scholarship and judicial career ==
While studying law at Haile Selassie I University, Abdi held a leadership role in the Consolidated Laws of Ethiopia Project, a major initiative undertaken by the Faculty of Law to collect, organize, and publish uncodified Ethiopian legislation enacted since 1944. A later scholarly review of the project identifies William H. Ewing as Project Director and Beyene Abdi as Assistant Director.

The project involved legal research, legislative analysis, translation, editorial review, publication management, and supervision of student contributors. Abdi later served as editor of Consolidated Laws of Ethiopia: Supplement No. 1, September 10, 1970–September 10, 1973, published by the Faculty of Law of Haile Selassie I University.

After completing his legal studies, he entered judicial service. Amnesty International identified him as a former judge. He served in judicial and legal positions that included High Court Judge, Supreme Court Judge, Presiding Judge, and Ministry of Justice representative. His assignments included service in several regions of Ethiopia.

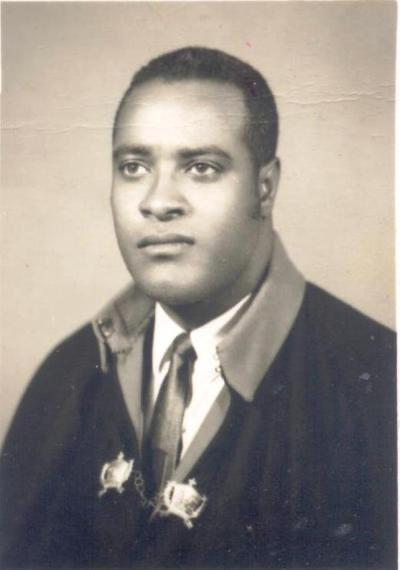
Beyene Abdi - Parliamentarian

== Publications and editorial work ==
Abdi contributed to legal scholarship and publishing as editor of Consolidated Laws of Ethiopia: Supplement No. 1, September 10, 1970–September 10, 1973.

In his later years, he authored Mammaaksa fi Geerarsa Oromoo ("Oromo Proverbs and Folksongs"), a collection of Oromo proverbs and traditional folksongs intended to preserve Oromo oral literature, language, and cultural heritage.

== Reconciliation work ==
After his judicial career, Abdi served in the Prime Minister's Office as a Chairman of a Reconciliation Committee. In this role, he participated in efforts aimed at dialogue, trust-building, and national unity.

== Oromo civic leadership ==
Abdi was involved in the Maccaa fi Tuullamaa Association, an Oromo civic and welfare organization. Amnesty International described him as having been for many years an official of the Mecha Tulema welfare association. The association is widely discussed in scholarship on Oromo civic activism and political history.

Following the political changes of 1991, Abdi became active in the re-established Maccaa fi Tuullamaa Association and participated in Oromo civic and welfare activities. Human rights reporting later identified him as a board member of both the Human Rights League and the Matcha/Tulama Association.

== Human rights advocacy ==
Abdi was a founding member and board member of the Human Rights League, an Oromo-led human rights organization. The United Nations Working Group on Arbitrary Detention identified him as a former judge, former parliamentarian, and board member of the Human Rights League. The Human Rights League worked to promote human rights awareness, monitor violations, and provide legal assistance to victims of human rights abuses.

Amnesty International raised concerns about the detention of Human Rights League members and described Abdi as among Oromo civic and human rights figures detained during the period. Subsequent Amnesty reporting continued to list Abdi among those whose detention raised concern.

== Oromo-language publishing ==
Abdi was active in Oromo-language publishing and media development. In 1991, he became a founding member of the Afaan Oromo publication Urjii, one of the early Oromo-language periodicals established following the political changes of the early 1990s. Human rights reporting from the period connected Urjii and Oromo civic activists to broader concerns about freedom of expression and political detention.

Abdi later served as President of the Board of Directors of Bilisummaa Art, Publication, and Advertisement Company, which published Oromo-language periodicals including Urjii, Coqorsa, and Madda Walaabuu. These publications promoted literacy, cultural preservation, public dialogue, and civic engagement among Oromo communities.

== Imprisonment ==
In the late 1990s, Abdi was arrested along with other Oromo civic leaders, Human Rights League officials, and community activists during a period of heightened political tension in Ethiopia. Amnesty International reported that he was among several prominent Oromo figures detained and raised concerns that the detainees were being held for peaceful human rights and community activities.

Human Rights Watch called on the Ethiopian government to end the detention without charge of Oromo civic leaders and human rights advocates, including Beyene Abdi.

Subsequent Amnesty International reports documented continuing concerns about Abdi and other detainees, describing him as a former judge and listing him among probable prisoners of conscience and cases of legal concern. The case later came before the United Nations Working Group on Arbitrary Detention, which reviewed the circumstances surrounding the detention of Human Rights League leaders and Oromo civic activists.

== Publications ==
In his later years, Abdi contributed to the preservation of Oromo cultural heritage through writing and documentation. He is the author of Mammaaksa fi Geerarsa Oromoo, a collection of Oromo proverbs (mammaaksa) and traditional folksongs (geerarsa). According to the book's preface, the work was compiled to preserve and celebrate traditional Oromo wisdom, oral literature, Afaan Oromo, and cultural heritage.

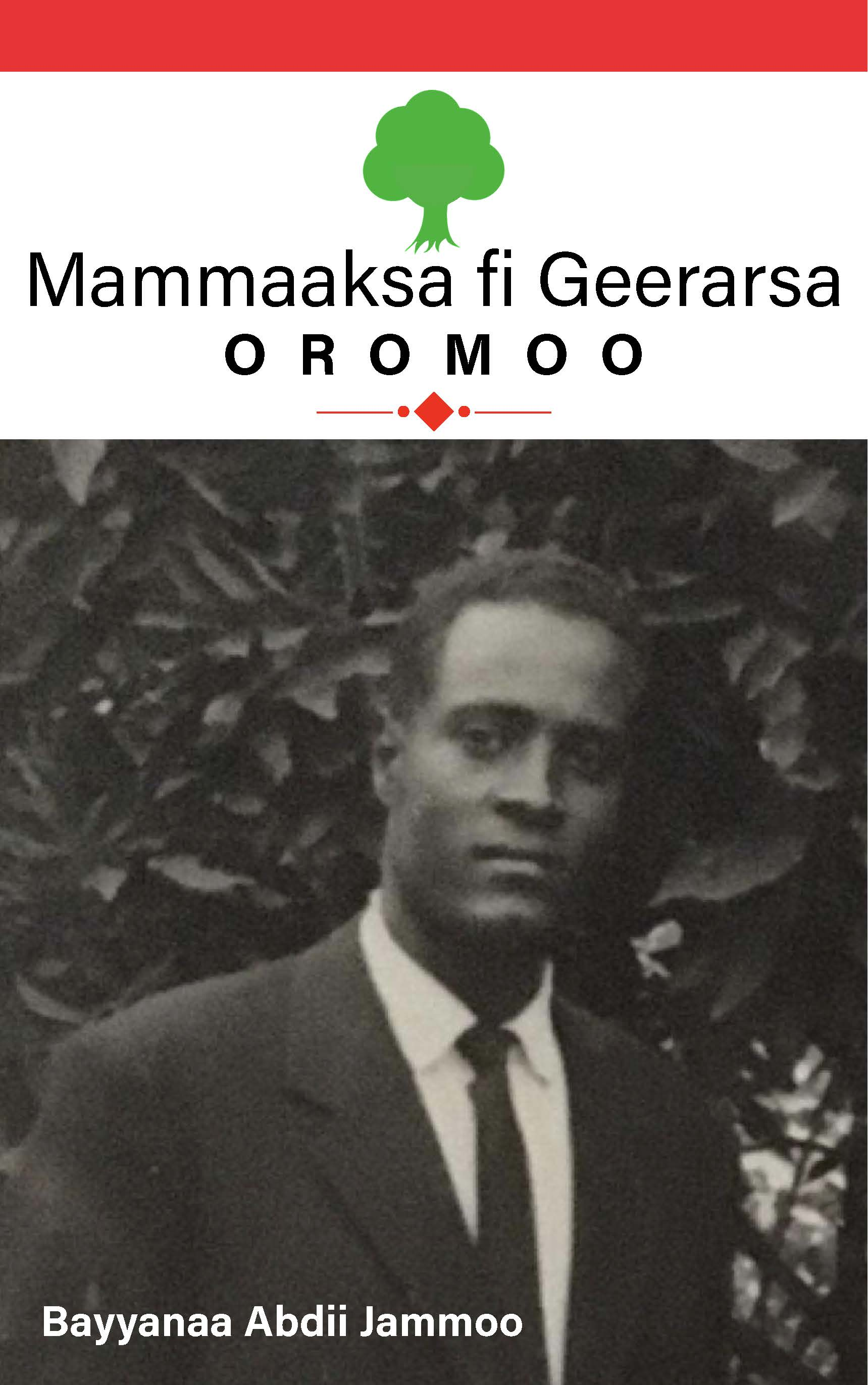
Book Cover - Mammaaksa fi Geerarsa Oromoo

== Personal life ==
Abdi has been married to his wife since 1954. They have eight children—three sons and five daughters—as well as 16 grandchildren and eight great-grandchildren.

== Selected works ==
- Mammaaksa fi Geerarsa Oromoo
- Consolidated Laws of Ethiopia (editor)
