= Ancella Bickley =

American historian (1930–2026)

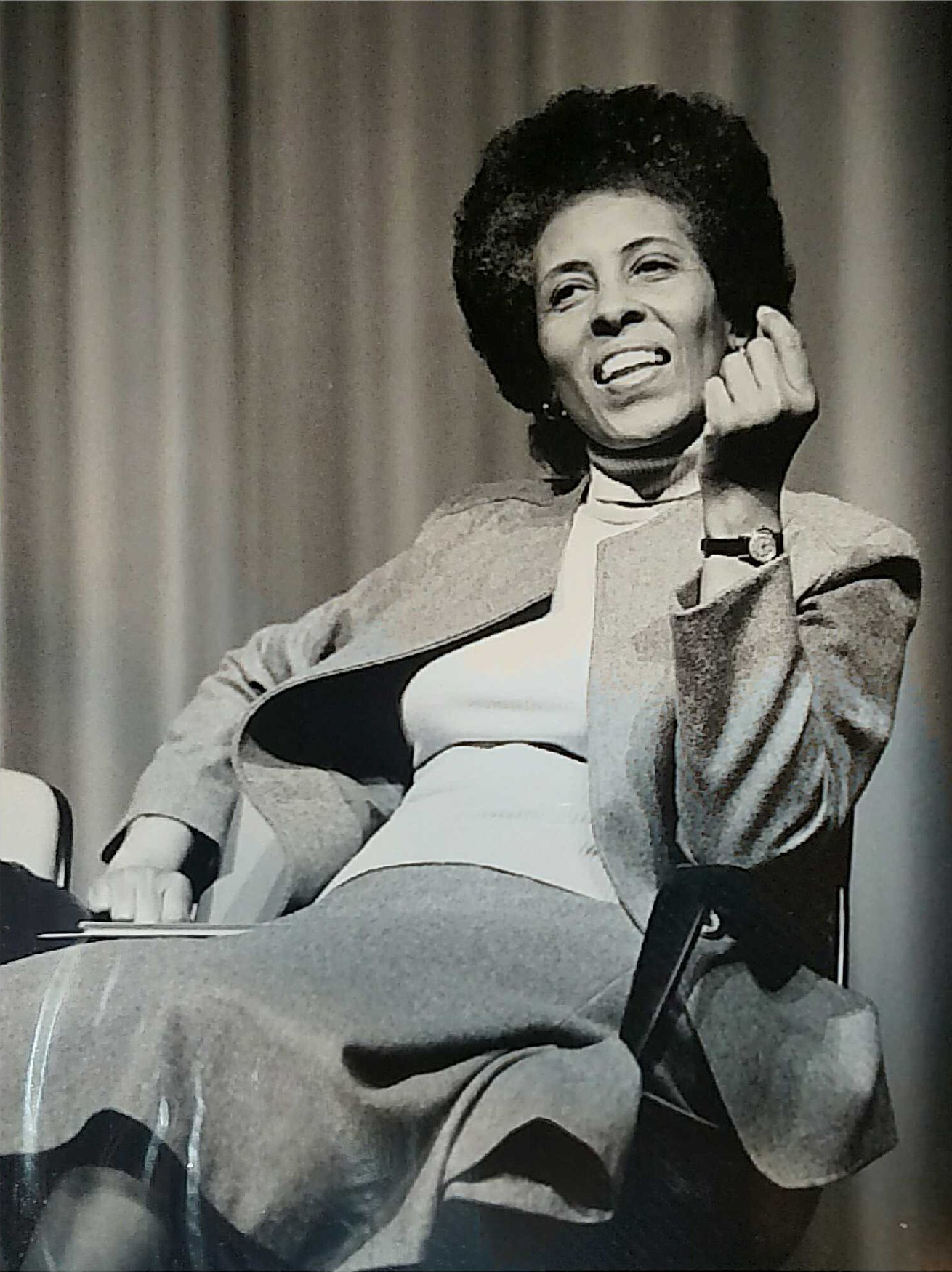
- Born: Ancella Radford Bickley; July 4, 1930; Huntington, West Virginia, U.S.
- Died: February 16, 2026 (aged 95)
- Title: Professor Emeritus

Academic background
- Education: West Virginia State College, Marshall University
- Alma mater: West Virginia University

Academic work
- Discipline: Historian
- Sub-discipline: African-American history
- Institutions: West Virginia State University

Ancella Radford Bickley (July 4, 1930 – February 16, 2026) was an American historian who was involved in the preservation of African American history in West Virginia.

== Early life and education ==
Bickley was born in Huntington, West Virginia, on July 4, 1930. She earned a bachelor's degree in English from West Virginia State College, now West Virginia State University in 1950, a master's degree in English from Marshall University (where she was the first full-time African American student) in 1954, and an Ed.D. in English from West Virginia University in 1974.

== Career ==
Bickley, professor emerita of English, retired as vice president of academic affairs at West Virginia State University, and lived in Florida. She continued her work to bring greater recognition to African Americans, their history in Appalachia, and their accomplishments. With Lynda Ann Ewen, she co-edited Memphis Tennessee Garrison: The Remarkable Story of a Black Appalachian Woman, published by Ohio University Press. Bickley has authored stories and articles, for example, in West Virginia's cultural magazine, Goldenseal. She also conducted and published interviews at Marshall University for the Oral History of Appalachia Program.

In 1993, Bill Drennen, commissioner of the West Virginia Division of Culture and History, recorded a thirty-minute interview with Bickley for the Cultural Conversations series.

She was a Rockefeller Foundation Scholar funded through Center for the Study of Ethnicity and Gender in Appalachia (CSEGA) at Marshall University, in 1999.

== Legacy ==
The West Virginia State Archives house a collection of documents gifted to them by Bickley, half of the materials relating to the annual West Virginia Conferences on Black History begun in 1988. Another portion of materials donated pertain to the Alliance for the Collection, Preservation, and Dissemination of West Virginia's Black History, organized to plan the conferences and foster efforts to preserve and collect black history statewide.

The West Virginia & Regional History Center at WVU Libraries holds a collection of Bickley's papers pertaining to her research, service, and family life.

== Death ==
Bickley died on February 16, 2026, at the age of 95.

== Selected publications ==
In 1997, Bickley published Our Mount Vernons to identify sites significant to West Virginia Black history.

With Lynda Ann Ewen, she co-edited Memphis Tennessee Garrison: The Remarkable Story of a Black Appalachian Woman, published by Ohio University Press. She has written stories and articles for publications including West Virginia cultural magazine, Goldenseal. She wrote a history of the West Virginia Schools for the Colored Deaf and Blind.

Other works include the short stories Martha, On This Rock, and My Simple City.
