= East Hall (Institute, West Virginia) =

Historic house in West Virginia, United States

- U.S. National Register of Historic Places
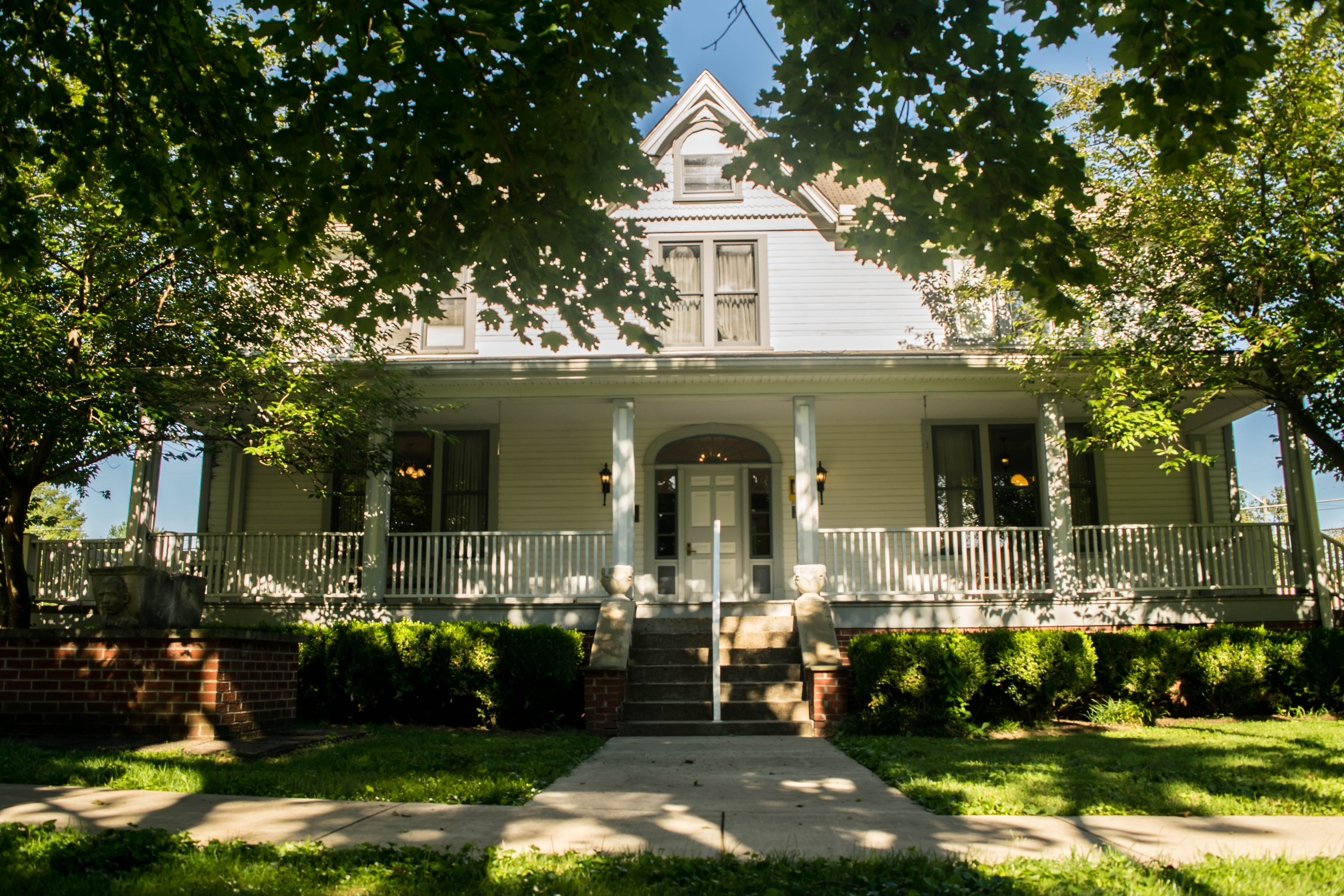

- Location within West Virginia Location within the United States
- Location: West Quadrangle, West Virginia State University, Institute, West Virginia
- Coordinates: 38°22′44″N 81°46′7″W
- Area: less than one acre
- Built: 1893
- NRHP reference No.: 88001585
- Added to NRHP: September 26, 1988

East Hall is a historic home located on the campus of West Virginia State University at Institute, Kanawha County, West Virginia. It was built in 1893, and is a modest, two-story frame building with a hipped roof. In 1937, it was moved from the east side of campus to the west quadrangle. Until 1974, it was the official home to presidents of West Virginia State University and is the oldest building on campus.

It was listed on the National Register of Historic Places in 1988.
