= Afrocentric education =

Pedagogical approach designed to empower people of the African diaspora

Afrocentric education refers to a pedagogical approach to education designed to empower people of the African diaspora with educational modes in contact and in line with the cultural assumptions common in their communities. A central premise behind it is that many Africans have been subjugated by having their awareness of themselves limited and by being indoctrinated with ideas that work against them and their cultures.

Like educational leaders of other cultures, proponents assert that what educates one group of people does not necessarily educate and empower another group, so they assert educational priorities distinctly for the Africans in a given context.

== Philosophy ==
Afrocentric education has, as one of its tenets, the decolonization of the African mind. The central objective in decolonizing the African mind is to overthrow the authority that alien traditions may exercise.

== Education ==
The term "miseducation" was coined by Carter G. Woodson to describe the process of systematically depriving African Americans of their knowledge of self. Woodson believed that miseducation was the root of the problems of the masses of the African-American community and that if the masses of the African-American community were given the correct knowledge and education from the beginning, they would not be in the situation that they find themselves in today. Woodson argues in his book The Mis-Education of the Negro that African Americans often valorize European culture to the detriment of their own culture.

== History ==
This has been an active area of Afrocentrism for many decades.

=== 19th and early 20th century ===
Edward Wilmot Blyden, an American-Liberian educator and diplomat active in the pan-Africa movement, perceived a change in perception taking place among Europeans towards Africans in his 1908 book African Life and Customs, which originated as a series of articles in the Sierra Leone Weekly News. In it, he proposed that Africans were beginning to be seen simply as different and not as inferior, in part because of the work of English writers such as Mary Kingsley and Lady Lugard, who traveled and studied in Africa. Such an enlightened view was fundamental to refute prevailing ideas among Western peoples about African cultures and Africans.

Blyden used that standpoint to show how the traditional social, industrial, and economic life of Africans untouched by "either European or Asiatic influence", was different and complete in itself, with its own organic wholeness. In a letter responding to Blyden's original series of articles, Fante journalist and politician J. E. Casely Hayford commented, "It is easy to see the men and women who walked the banks of the Nile" passing him on the streets of Kumasi. Hayford suggested building a university to preserve African identity and instincts. In that university, the history chair would teach

Universal history, with particular reference to the part Ethiopia has played in the affairs of the world. I would lay stress upon the fact that while Ramses II was dedicating temples to 'the God of gods, and secondly to his own glory,' the God of the Hebrews had not yet appeared unto Moses in the burning bush; that Africa was the cradle of the world's systems and philosophies, and the nursing mother of its religions. In short, that Africa has nothing to be ashamed of in its place among the nations of the earth. I would make it possible for this seat of learning to be the means of revising erroneous current ideas regarding the African; of raising him in self-respect; and of making him an efficient co-worker in the uplifting of man to nobler effort.

The exchange of ideas between Blyden and Hayford embodied the fundamental concepts of Afrocentrism.

In the United States, during the early 20th century and the Harlem Renaissance, many writers and historians gathered in major cities, where they began to work on documenting achievements of Africans throughout history, in United States and Western life. They began to set up institutions to support scholarly work in African-American history and literature, such as the American Negro Academy (now the Black Academy of Letters and Arts), founded in Washington, DC, in 1874. Some men were self-taught; others rose through the academic system. Creative writers and artists claimed space for African-American perspectives.

Leaders included bibliophile Arthur Schomburg, who devoted his life to collecting literature, art, slave narratives, and other artifacts of the African diaspora. In 1911, along with John Edward Bruce, he founded the Negro Society for Historical Research in Yonkers, New York. The value of Schomburg's personal collection was recognized, and it was purchased by the New York Public Library in 1926 with the aid of a Carnegie Corporation grant. It became the basis of what is now called the Schomburg Center for Research in Black Culture, based in Harlem, New York. Schomburg used the money from the sale of his collection for more travel and acquisition of materials.

Hubert Henry Harrison used his intellectual gifts in street lectures and political activism, influencing early generations of Black Socialists and Black Nationalists. Dr. Carter G. Woodson co-founded the Association for the Study of African American Life and History (as it is now called) in 1915, as well as The Journal of Negro History, so that scholars of black history could be supported and find venues for their work.

Among their topics, editors of publications such as NAACP's The Crisis and Journal of Negro History sought to include articles that countered the prevailing view that Sub-Saharan Africa had contributed little of value to human history that was not the result of incursions by Europeans and Arabs. Historians began to theorize that Ancient Egyptian civilization was the culmination of events arising from the origin of the human race in Africa. They investigated the history of Africa from that perspective.

In March 1925, Schomburg published an essay "The Negro Digs Up His Past" in an issue of the Survey Graphic devoted to Harlem's intellectual life. The article had widespread distribution and influence, as he detailed the achievements of people of African descent. Alain Locke included the essay in his collection The New Negro.

Afrocentrists claimed The Mis-Education of the Negro (1933) by Carter G. Woodson, an African-American historian, as one of their foundational texts. Woodson critiqued education of African Americans as "mis-education" because he held that it denigrated the black while glorifying the white. For these early Afrocentrists, the goal was to break what they saw as a vicious cycle of the reproduction of black self-abnegation. In the words of The Crisis editor W. E. B. Du Bois, the world left African Americans with a "double consciousness," and a sense of "always looking at one's self through the eyes of others, of measuring one's soul by the tape of a world that looks on in amused contempt and pity."

In his early years, W. E. B. Du Bois, researched West African cultures and attempted to construct a pan-Africanist value system based on West African traditions. In the 1950s Du Bois envisioned and received funding from Ghanaian president Kwame Nkrumah to produce an Encyclopedia Africana to chronicle the history and cultures of Africa. Du Bois died before being able to complete his work. Some aspects of Du Bois's approach are evident in work by Cheikh Anta Diop in the 1950s and 1960s.

Du Bois inspired a number of authors, including Drusilla Dunjee Houston. After reading his work The Negro (1915), Houston embarked upon writing her Wonderful Ethiopians of the Ancient Cushite Empire (1926). The book was a compilation of evidence related to the historic origins of Cush and Ethiopia, and assessed their influences on Greece.

=== 1960s and 1970s ===
The 1960s and 1970s were times of social and political ferment. In the U.S. were born new forms of Black Nationalism, Black Power and the Black Arts Movements, all began to be driven, to a degree, driven to some degree by an identification with "Mother Africa." Afrocentric scholars and Black youth also challenged Eurocentric ideas in academia.

The work of Cheikh Anta Diop became very influential. In the following decades, histories related to Africa and the diaspora gradually incorporated a more African perspective. Since that time, Afrocentrists have increasingly seen African peoples as the makers and shapers of their own histories.

You have all heard of the African Personality; of African democracy, of the African way to socialism, of negritude, and so on. They are all props we have fashioned at different times to help us get on our feet again. Once we are up we shan't need any of them any more. But for the moment it is in the nature of things that we may need to counter racism with what Jean-Paul Sartre has called an anti-racist racism, to announce not just that we are as good as the next man but that we are much better.
—Chinua Achebe, 1965

In this context, ethnocentric Afrocentrism was not intended to be essential or permanent, but was a consciously fashioned strategy of resistance to the Eurocentrism of the time. Afrocentric scholars adopted two approaches: a deconstructive rebuttal of what they called "the whole archive of European ideological racism" and a reconstructive act of writing new self-constructed histories.

At a 1974 UNESCO symposium in Cairo titled "The Peopling of Ancient Egypt and the Decipherment of Meroitic Script", Cheikh Anta Diop brought together scholars of Egypt from around the world.

Key texts from this period include:

- The Destruction of Black Civilization (1971) by Chancellor Williams
- The African Origins of Civilization: Myth or Reality (1974) by Cheikh Anta Diop
- They Came Before Columbus: The African Presence in Ancient America (1976) by Ivan Van Sertima

Some Afrocentric writers focused on study of indigenous African civilizations and peoples, to emphasize African history separate from European or Arab influence. Primary among them was Chancellor Williams, whose book The Destruction of Black Civilization: Great Issues of a Race from 4500 B.C. to 2000 A.D. set out to determine a "purely African body of principles, value systems (and) philosophy of life".

=== 1980s and 1990s ===
In the 1980s and 1990s, Afrocentrism increasingly became seen as a tool for addressing social ills and a means of grounding community efforts toward self-determination and political and economic empowerment.

In his (1992) article "Eurocentrism vs. Afrocentrism", US anthropologist Linus A. Hoskins wrote:

The vital necessity for African people to use the weapons of education and history to extricate themselves from this psychological dependency complex/syndrome as a necessary precondition for liberation. [...] If African peoples (the global majority) were to become Afrocentric (Afrocentrized), ... that would spell the ineluctable end of European global power and dominance. This is indeed the fear of Europeans. ... Afrocentrism is a state of mind, a particular subconscious mind-set that is rooted in the ancestral heritage and communal value system.

American educator Jawanza Kunjufu made the case that hip hop culture, rather than being creative expression of the culture, was the root of many social ills. For some Afrocentrists, the contemporary problems of the ghetto stemmed not from race and class inequality, but rather from a failure to inculcate Black youth with Afrocentric values.

In the West and elsewhere, the European, in the midst of other peoples, has often propounded an exclusive view of reality; the exclusivity of this view creates a fundamental human crisis. In some cases, it has created cultures arrayed against each other or even against themselves. Afrocentricity’s response certainly is not to impose its own particularity as a universal, as Eurocentricity has often done. But hearing the voice of African American culture with all of its attendant parts is one way of creating a more sane society and one model for a more humane world. –Asante, M. K. (1988)

In 1997, US cultural historian Nathan Glazer described Afrocentricity as a form of multiculturalism. He wrote that its influence ranged from sensible proposals about inclusion of more African material in school curricula to what he called senseless claims about African primacy in all major technological achievements. Glazer argued that Afrocentricity had become more important due to the failure of mainstream society to assimilate all African Americans. Anger and frustration at their continuing separation gave black Americans the impetus to reject traditions that excluded them.

=== 2000s ===
Today, Afrocentricity takes many forms, including striving for a more multicultural and balanced approach to the study of history and sociology. Afrocentrists contend that race still exists as a social and political construct. They argue that for centuries in academia, Eurocentric ideas about history were dominant: ideas such as blacks having no civilizations, no written languages, no cultures, and no histories of any note before coming into contact with Europeans. Further, according to the views of some Afrocentrists, European history has commonly received more attention within the academic community than the history of sub-Saharan African cultures or those of the many Pacific Island peoples. Afrocentrists contend it is important to divorce the historical record from past racism. Molefi Kete Asante's book Afrocentricity (1988) argues that African-Americans should look to African cultures "as a critical corrective to a displaced agency among Africans." Some Afrocentrists believe that the burden of Afrocentricity is to define and develop African agency in the midst of the cultural wars debate. By doing so, Afrocentricity can support all forms of multiculturalism.

Afrocentrists argue that Afrocentricity is important for people of all ethnicities who want to understand African history and the African diaspora. For example, the Afrocentric method can be used to research African indigenous culture. Queeneth Mkabela writes in 2005 that the Afrocentric perspective provides new insights for understanding African indigenous culture, in a multicultural context. According to Mkabela and others, the Afrocentric method is a necessary part of complete scholarship and without it, the picture is incomplete, less accurate, and less objective.

Studies of African and African-diaspora cultures have shifted understanding and created a more positive acceptance of influence by African religious, linguistic and other traditions, both among scholars and the general public. For example, religious movements such as Vodou are now less likely to be characterized as "mere superstition", but understood in terms of links to African traditions.

In recent years Africana Studies or Africology departments at many major universities have grown out of the Afrocentric "Black Studies" departments formed in the 1970s. Rather than focusing on black topics in the African diaspora (often exclusively African American topics), these reformed departments aim to expand the field to encompass all of the African diaspora. They also seek to better align themselves with other University departments and find continuity and compromise between the radical Afrocentricity of the past decades and the multicultural scholarship found in many fields today.

== List of schools ==
=== Public schools ===
- African-Centered College Preparatory Academy (Kansas City, Missouri)
- Columbus Africentric Early College (Columbus, Ohio)

=== Public charter schools ===
- Betty Shabazz International Charter School (Chicago, Illinois)
- Imhotep Institute Charter High School (Philadelphia, Pennsylvania)

== See also ==
- Pedagogy
- Philosophy of education
- Afrocentrism
- Africana studies
- Black nationalism
- Black separatism
- Afrikan Centered Education Collegium Campus
