= The Associated Publishers =

Former publishing company founded by Carter G. Woodson

The Associated Publishers was a producer of printed materials, founded by historian Carter G. Woodson in June 1921. The publishing company, initially established to help Woodson produce his own works, helped many other scholars of black history deliver their works to the public.

== History ==
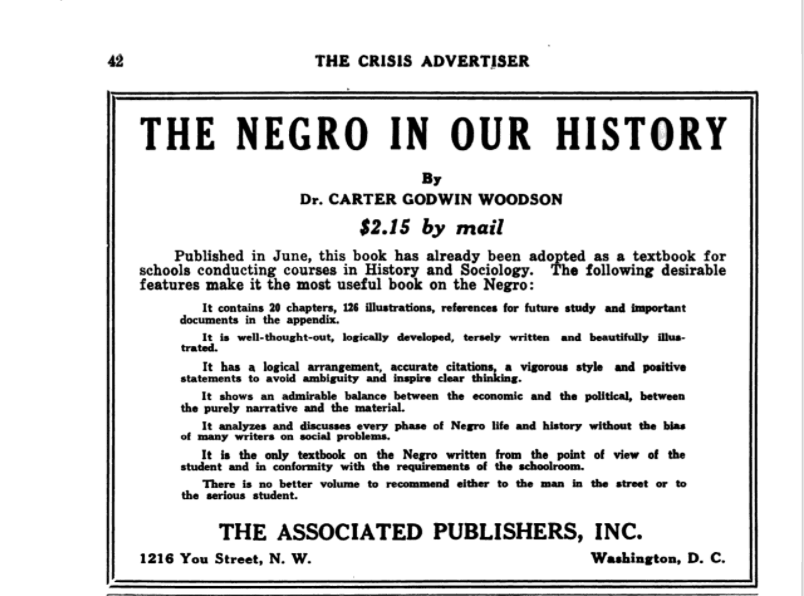
Advertisement for a book published by the Associated Publishers

After World War I, Woodson sensed a desire in the African-American community to know more about their past. Because the major publishing companies at the time showed no interest for producing serious works on this topic, Carter G. Woodson organized the Associated Publishers in November 1920. It was conceived as a funding resource for the Association for the Study of African American Life and History.

The company produced more than 200 books, covering wide swaths of African American life and history. Many were of a formal, footnoted nature, written by recognized authorities in historical scholarship. The company published several collections of short stories, primarily for young readers, with an emphasis on important people and events. Other titles included poetry, drama, and sports.

The company published a variety of materials, including monographs, translations of the works of reputable foreign scholars, pictures, and even calendars.

The Associated Publishers closed in 2005.

== Contributing authors and illustrators ==
- Horace Mann Bond – author
- Maud Cuney-Hare – author
- W. Montague Cobb – author
- Paul Laurence Dunbar – author
- Lois Mailou Jones – illustrator
- Robert T. Kerlin – author
- Frank J. Klingberg – author
- Kelly Miller – author
- James A. Porter – illustrator
- Alrutheus Ambush Taylor, Ph.D. – author

== Significant publications ==
Some of the more significant publications that were produced between 1920 and 2005:

- The Mis-Education of the Negro, Dr. C. G. Woodson, 1933
- The Negro in Our History, Dr. C. G. Woodson, 1922
- The History of the Negro Church, Dr. C. G. Woodson, 1921
- The Everlasting Stain, Dr. Kelly Miller, 1924
- Negro Orators and Their Orations, Dr. C. G. Woodson (Ed.), 1926
- Negro Makers of History, Dr. C. G. Woodson, 1928
- African Myths Together with Proverbs, Dr. C. G. Woodson, 1928
- The Negro as a Businessman, Dr. C. G. Woodson, 1929
- The Story of the Negro Retold, Dr. C. G. Woodson, 1935
- Negro Musicians and Their Music by Maud Cuney-Hare, 1936
- African Heroes and Heroines, Dr. C. G. Woodson, 1939
- Richard Allen: An Apostle of Freedom by Charles Wesley, 1969
- Robert S. Duncanson, 19th Century Black Romantic Painter by James Dallas Parks, 1980
- Walking Proud: The Story of Dr. Carter Godwin Woodson by Sister M. Anthony Scally, RSM, 1983
