= Alexander L. Jackson =

American business owner and civic leader

- Born: March 1, 1891; Englewood
- Died: October 21, 1973 (aged 82); Chicago
- Alma mater: Phillips Academy; Harvard College

Alexander Louis Jackson II (March 1, 1891 – October 21, 1973) was an African American business owner and civic leader. Active in the Black community of Chicago's South Side, Jackson was the executive secretary of the Wabash Avenue YMCA, a co-founder of the Chicago Urban League, and general manager of The Chicago Defender. He also helped found the Association for the Study of Negro Life and History along with Carter G. Woodson in 1916.

== Early life and education ==
Alexander Louis Jackson II was born on March 1, 1891, in Englewood, New Jersey. He was the son of Alexander Louis Jackson and Evelyn Martha (Lewis) Jackson.

He attended Englewood High School. He graduated from the majority-white Phillips Academy in Andover, Massachusetts, in 1910, and was selected as his class's commencement speaker. Jackson received an A.B. from Harvard College in 1914; his majors were English literature, sociology, and education. While at Harvard, Jackson lettered in track and field and was again selected to be his class commencement speaker.

== Career and civic leadership ==
Jackson met Carter G. Woodson in 1911 when he was a sophomore at Harvard; they frequently discussed African American history and would go on to work on multiple projects together. After graduating from Harvard in 1914, Jackson took a job as Student YMCA Secretary, working under Jesse E. Moorland and Channing Heggie Tobias in Washington, D.C. The next year he was transferred to become Executive Secretary of the Wabash Avenue YMCA in Chicago.

Jackson was part of an interracial group of community leaders who founded the Chicago branch of the National Urban League in 1916. Along with Carter Woodson, George Cleveland Hall, James E. Stamps, and William B. Hartgrove, Jackson founded the Association for the Study of Negro Life and History in September 1916; it would later change its name to the Association for the Study of African American Life and History. During the Chicago race riot of 1919, he set up emergency pay stations for Black workers, who were cut off from resources by the police and white rioters.

In the fall of 1919, Jackson resigned from the Chicago YMCA and moved to New York City to become Educational Secretary of the National Urban League. He served in that position until 1921.

He returned to Chicago in 1921. From 1921 to 1924, he was the assistant to the publisher of The Chicago Defender, the well-known African American newspaper. He became the general manager of the Defender in 1925.

Jackson spent the rest of his career in business and real estate. He was the president-treasurer of the Manhasset, Plandome, and Montauk Building Corporation until his retirement in 1971. He served in many other organization leadership roles, including as director of the Chicago Council of Social Agencies and director of the Illinois League to Enforce Peace. From 1921 to 1936, he was the president of the trustees board of Provident Hospital and Training School, the first African-American-owned and operated hospital in the United States. He also served on the Board of Trustees for the Southside Boys Club Foundation and on the Executive Council of the Forty Club of Chicago.

== Personal life and death ==
Jackson married Charlotte E. Walker in 1914. Together they had four children: Caroline Booth (born 1915), Alexander Louis Jackson III (born 1920), William Edward Jackson (born 1924), and Winslow Loring Jackson (born 1928). After Charlotte died in 1928, he married James Lenas Boone, who died in 1966. He married his third wife, Marie Poston, in 1968. In the 1940s, Jackson lived in the Bronzeville neighborhood at 4655 South Michigan Avenue.

He died in Chicago on October 21, 1973.
