= Carter G. Woodson Home National Historic Site =

National Historic Site of the United States

- Carter G. Woodson House
- U.S. National Register of Historic Places
- U.S. National Historic Landmark
- U.S. National Historic Site
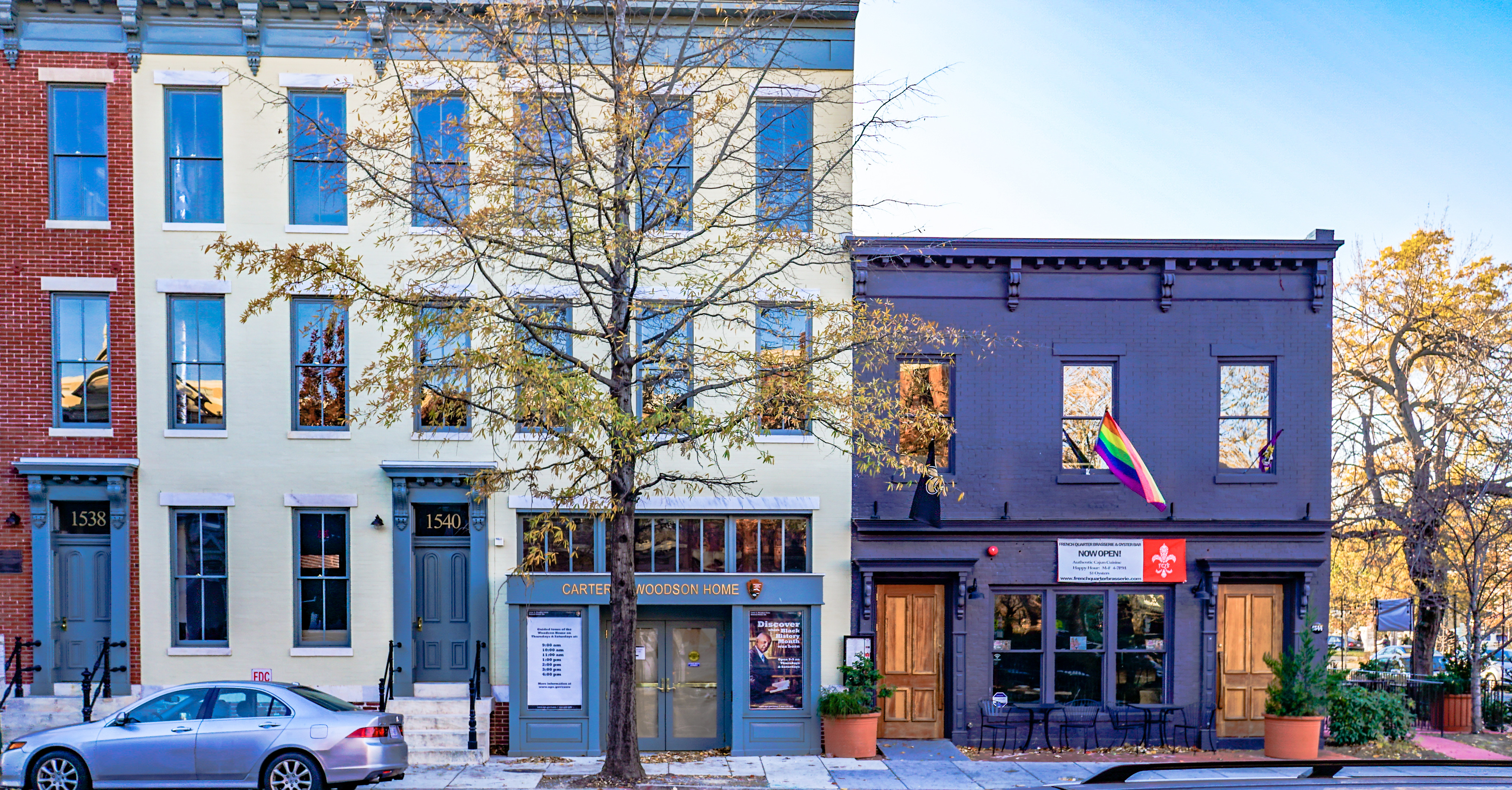
- Carter G. Woodson House (left) in 2017

- Location within Washington, D.C. Location within the United States
- Location: 1538 9th St., NW, Washington, D.C.
- Coordinates: 38°54′36″N 77°1′27″W
- Area: 0.15 acres (0.00061 km^{2})
- Built: 1915
- Architectural style: Late Victorian
- Visitation: 2,381 (2019)
- Website: Carter G. Woodson Home National Historic Site
- NRHP reference No.: 76002135

Significant dates
- Added to NRHP: May 11, 1976
- Designated NHL: May 11, 1976
- Designated NHS: February 27, 2006

Carter G. Woodson Home National Historic Site at 1538 9th Street NW, in the Shaw neighborhood of Washington, D.C., preserves the home of Carter G. Woodson (1875–1950). Woodson, the founder of Black History Month, was an African-American historian, author, and journalist. The house was designated a National Historic Landmark in 1976 but became vacant in the 1990s.

== History ==
Ida J. Heiberger sold her home to Carter G. Woodson on August 30, 1922. The property served as Dr. Woodson's home from 1922 until his death in 1950. From this three-story Victorian rowhouse, Woodson managed the operations of the Association for the Study of African American Life and History, published the Negro History Bulletin and the Journal of Negro History. Woodson installed a sign on the house next to the front door in capital letters that read THE ASSOCIATED PUBLISHERS, INC., in 1923. He operated Associated Publishers and pursued his research and writing about African-American history in the house. The house served as the venue for nine consecutive annual ASNLH meetings. Assisted by stenographers in his home office, Woodson drafted various works, books, letters, memos, announcements, and essays. The home continued to serve as the national headquarters of the Association until the early 1970s.The house was designated a National Historic Landmark in 1976 but became vacant in the 1990s.

In 2001, the National Trust for Historic Preservation placed the site on its annual "America's 11 Most Endangered Historic Places" list. With advocacy by the NTHP, the DC Preservation League, community activists, and Congresswoman Eleanor Holmes Norton, the National Historic Site was authorized by Public Law 108-192 on December 19, 2003, and established by Secretary of the Interior Gale Norton on February 27, 2006.

In 2005 the National Park Service acquired the property. To commemorate the finish of phase 1 renovation, an exceptional viewing of Woodson's home took place in February 2017 attracting 200 guests. The National Park Service opened the house to the public for National Park Week for three days in April 2017. It is operated in conjunction with the Mary McLeod Bethune Council House National Historic Site.

On November 7th, 2026, the Carter G. Woodson House reopened to the public after a decades long restoration effort.
