= Bessie Woodson Yancey =

African American poet (1882–1958)

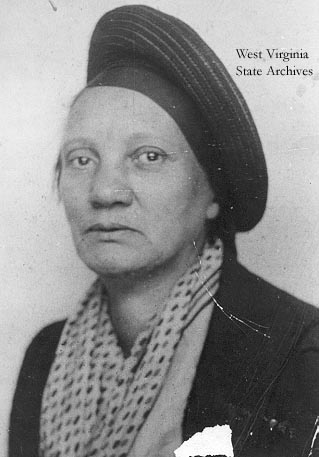
- Born: May 6, 1882; Buckingham County, Virginia, US
- Died: January 11, 1958 (aged 75); West Virginia, US
- Occupations: Teacher, poet, columnist, activist
- Notable work: Echoes from the Hills (1939)
- Movement: Affrilachia
- Relatives: Carter G. Woodson (brother)

Bessie Woodson Yancey (May 1882 – 11 January 1958) was an African-American poet, teacher, and activist, whose only published poetry collection, 1939's Echoes from the Hills, was, according to Katharine Capshaw Smith, "perhaps the earliest example of Affrilachian children's literature."

== Life ==
Bessie Woodson was born in New Canton, Virginia, to James Henry and Ann Eliza Riddle Woodson. She was the younger sister of famed Black historian and educator Carter G. Woodson. She was educated in a school run by her uncles, John Morton and James Buchanan Riddle, until 1892, when the family moved back to Huntington, West Virginia, where they had lived during the 1870s. There, she attended Douglass High School, where her brother Carter was a teacher, and principal. She graduated in 1901, and became a teacher herself.

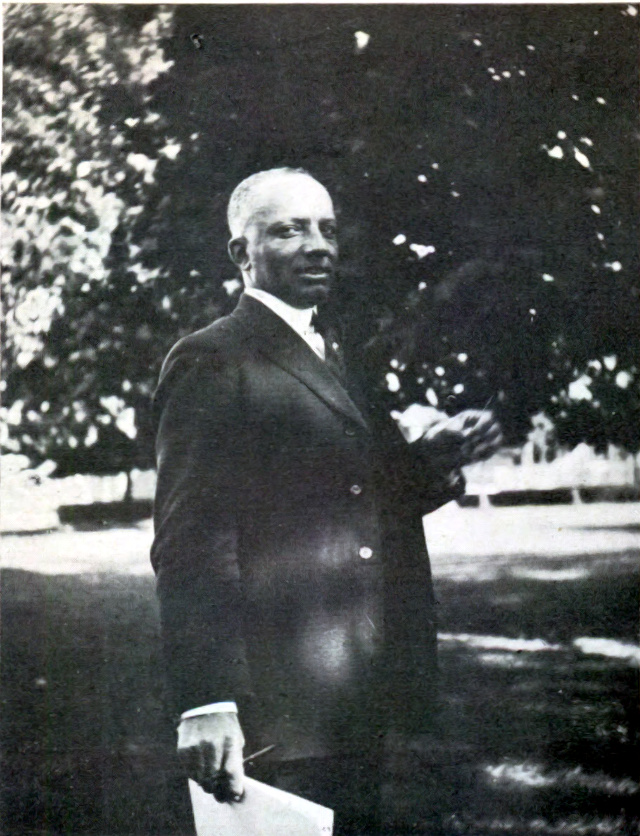
Yancey's brother, Carter G. Woodson, in 1923

Woodson married Robert Lee Johnson on 4 June 1905, with whom she had two daughters: Ursula and Belva. She and Lee later divorced, and she married Patrick Yancey of Louisa County, Virginia.

While working as a teacher in mining camps and along West Virginia's Guyandotte River, Yancey had first developed an interest in poetry. Her poems—written while working as a teacher and court house matron—explored "Appalachian identity, Black migration from the deep South, agricultural and mining labor, and the everyday joys of childhood in West Virginia." Defined as "'Affrilachian' (African-American + Appalachian)", by Katharine Capshaw Smith. Capshaw has described Yancey's poetry as being "cross written for and cross read by Black children and adults." Her only published collection, Echoes from the Hills (1939), "acknowledges the pressure on youth to become race leaders, and positions the child... as the visionary who will lead the community forward." They also seek to inculcate a love and appreciation of the natural world, possibly drawing on Yancey's experience as a schoolteacher, as well as exploring Black Appalachian identity. In "If You Live in West Virginia", she wrote:

If you live in West Virginia,

Come with me and pause a while.

See her wealth and power rising,

See her plains and valleys smile!

Give to eastern states their culture,

Give to northern states their fame,

Give to southern states their virtues

Which no other states may claim.

But in words of deathless glory

Far and wide where all may see

Write the name of West Virginia,

Champion of Liberty!

A review in the Negro History Bulletin, founded by her brother Carter G. Woodson, described the collection as aimed at "understanding life in its broadest aspects." Smith notes the influence of Paul Laurence Dunbar on Yancey's work; Yancey herself having written of him: "When I ponder your great works/ I feel like an atom." Smith notes, however, that:

"Yancey's work reaches beyond mere imitation of Dunbar, for her distinct difference in condition as an Affrilachian in the 1930s, rather than as an outsider to black southern culture like Dunbar, produces poetry intimately invested in questions of specific regional identity."

Woodson-Yancey never referred to herself as an "Affrilachian poet". Her work falls with-in the post-Harlem Renaissance, Great Depression-era body of artists and writers.

Despite never publishing another book, Yancey continued to write poetry, letters, and editorials, which were published in newspapers. She wrote more than 100 letters to the editor of local newspaper the Herald-Advertiser, eventually adopting pseudonyms on the advice of the editor. Yancey used her letters to comment on international events and civil rights, and to encourage desegregation. Though she received support for her 'mini-editorials,' "on at least one occasion [they] provoked an anonymous threat by a conservative reader."

Bessie Woodson Yancey died on January 11, 1958 of a stroke, in the home of her brother Carter G. Woodson. She is buried in Spring Hill Cemetery in Huntington, West Virginia.
