= National Half Century Exposition and Lincoln Jubilee =

American festival in 1915

National Half Century Anniversary Exposition and The Lincoln Jubilee: 50th Anniversary Celebration
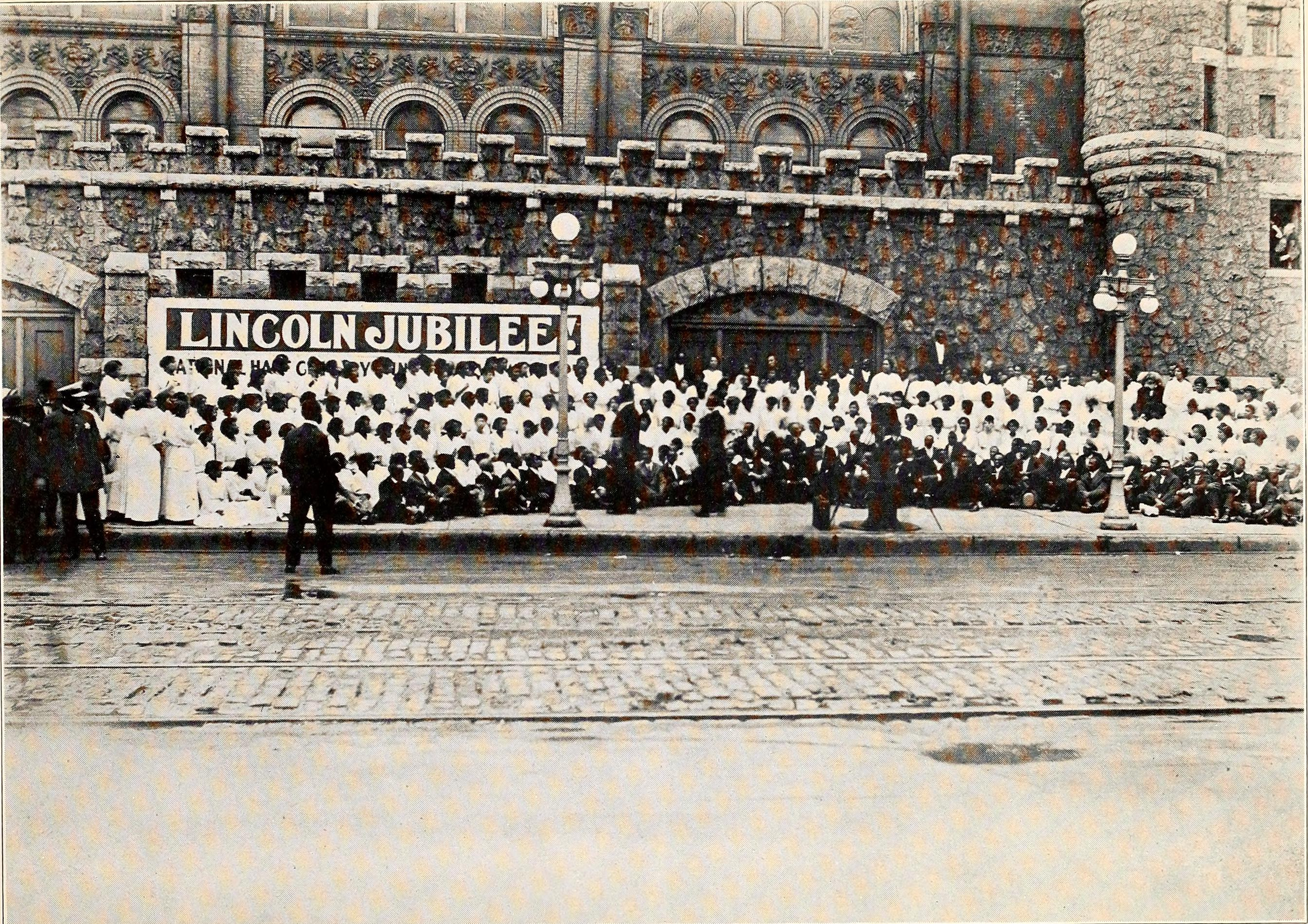
- Begins: August 22, 1915
- Ends: September 16, 1915
- Venue: Chicago Coliseum
- Locations: Chicago, Illinois
- Country: United States

The National Half Century Exposition and Lincoln Jubilee, was a festival exposition from August 22 to September 16, 1915 held in Chicago, Illinois, United States. It celebrated the 50th anniversary of the emancipation of enslaved African Americans. Held at the Chicago Coliseum near Bronzeville, the full official name of the exhibition was, the National Half Century Anniversary Exposition and The Lincoln Jubilee: 50th Anniversary Celebration.

== History ==
The Emancipation Proclamation was issued by United States president Abraham Lincoln on January 1, 1863. A gathering was held in Chicago in 1911 and an event celebrating the 50th anniversary of emancipation was proposed. It was originally planned for 1913 as the "Illinois (National) Half-Century Anniversary of Negro Freedom".

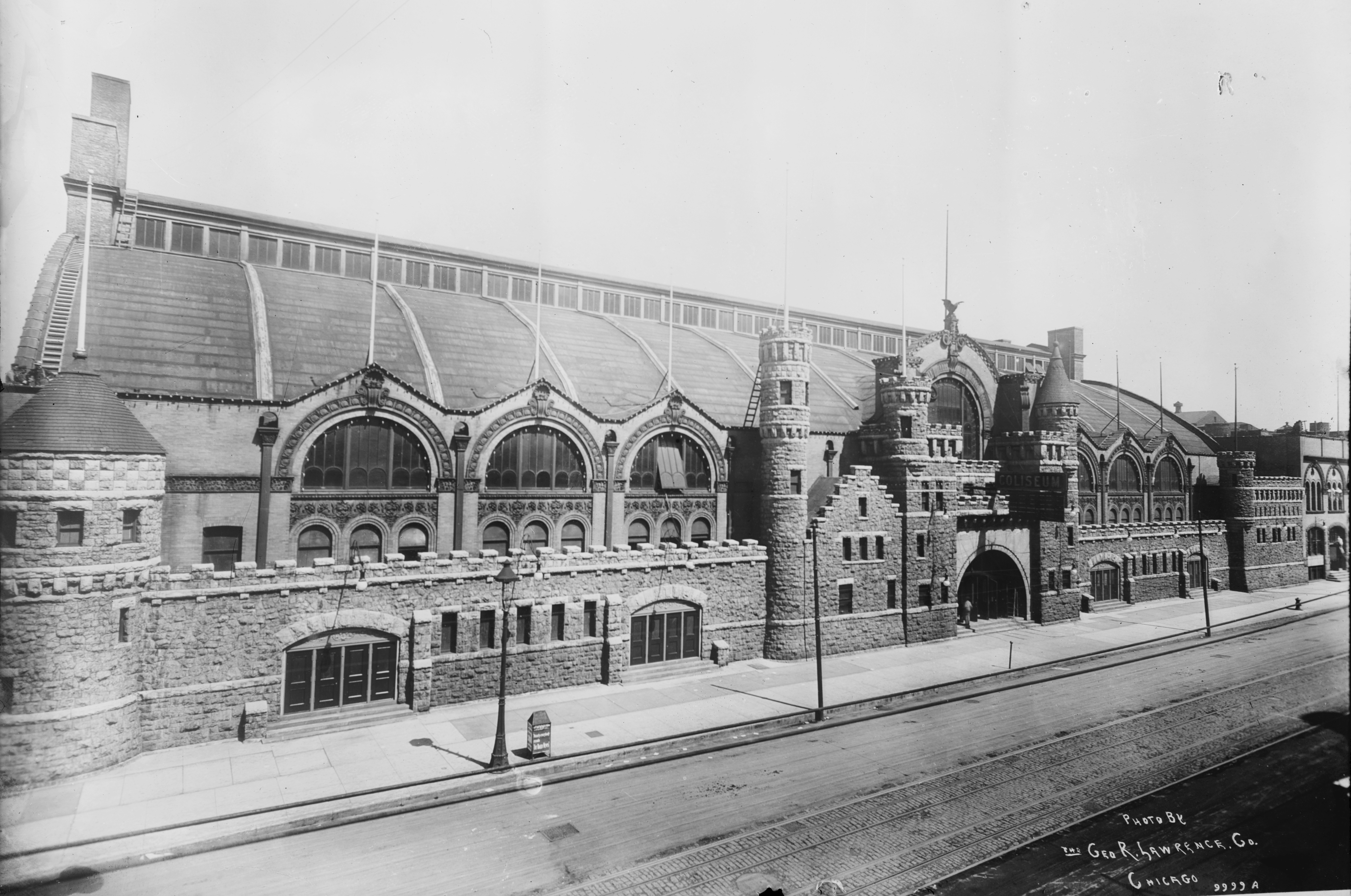
Chicago Coliseum at 1513 South Wabash Avenue, Chicago, Illinois

Atlas Printing Co. published the official program. The Fraternal Press in Chicago published a history and report on the event including the history of its establishment and photos of organizers that is available online. The event's photographer, John H. Ballard, published a photo album covering the event in 1915. It includes a leaf of music at its back titled "Praise God we are not weary" with words by Tom Brown, music by Tom Lemonier, and arranged by J. Wm. Coleman. The album is viewable online.

The Association for the Study of Negro Life and History was established by a group of prominent attendees who met during the event. Four months later member Carter G. Woodson published the first issue of the Journal of Negro History.

Chicago businessman Anthony Overton participated and promoted his skin care products at the event. He launched his Half-Century Magazine the following year.

The Library of Congress has a collection of Chicago Daily News photographs that includes images of the event.

== Gallery ==
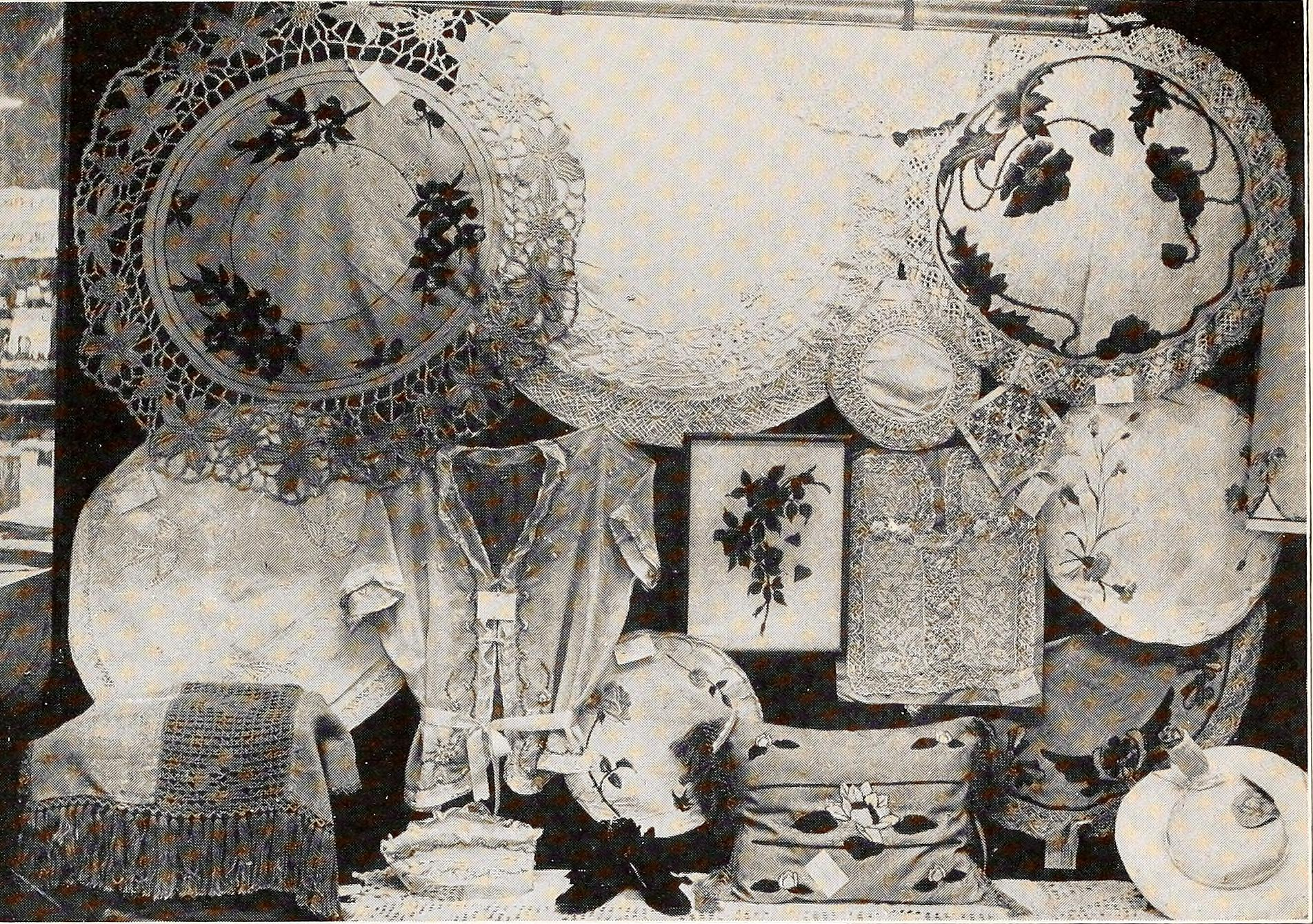
Michigan needlework exhibition

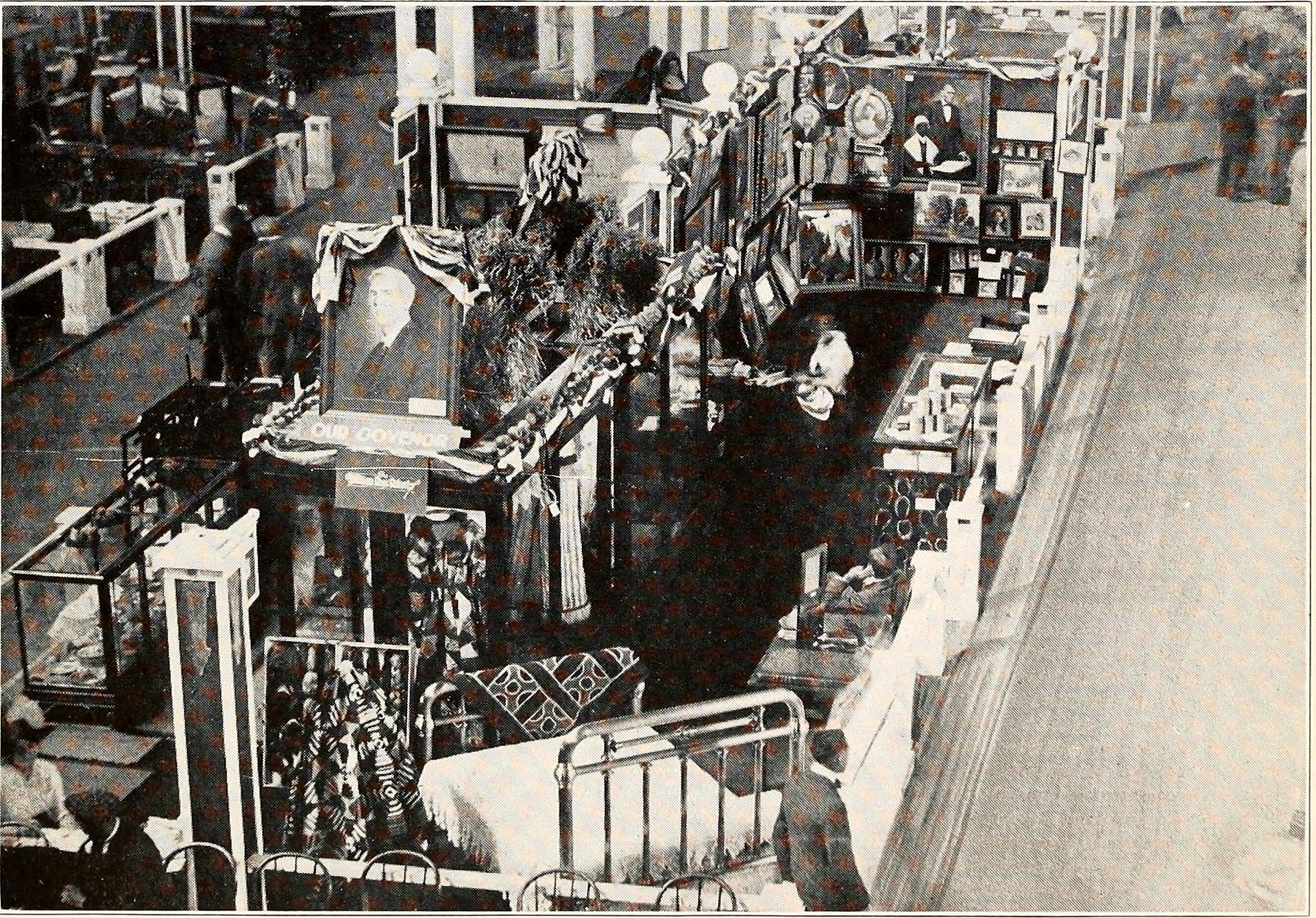
View of the exhibitions

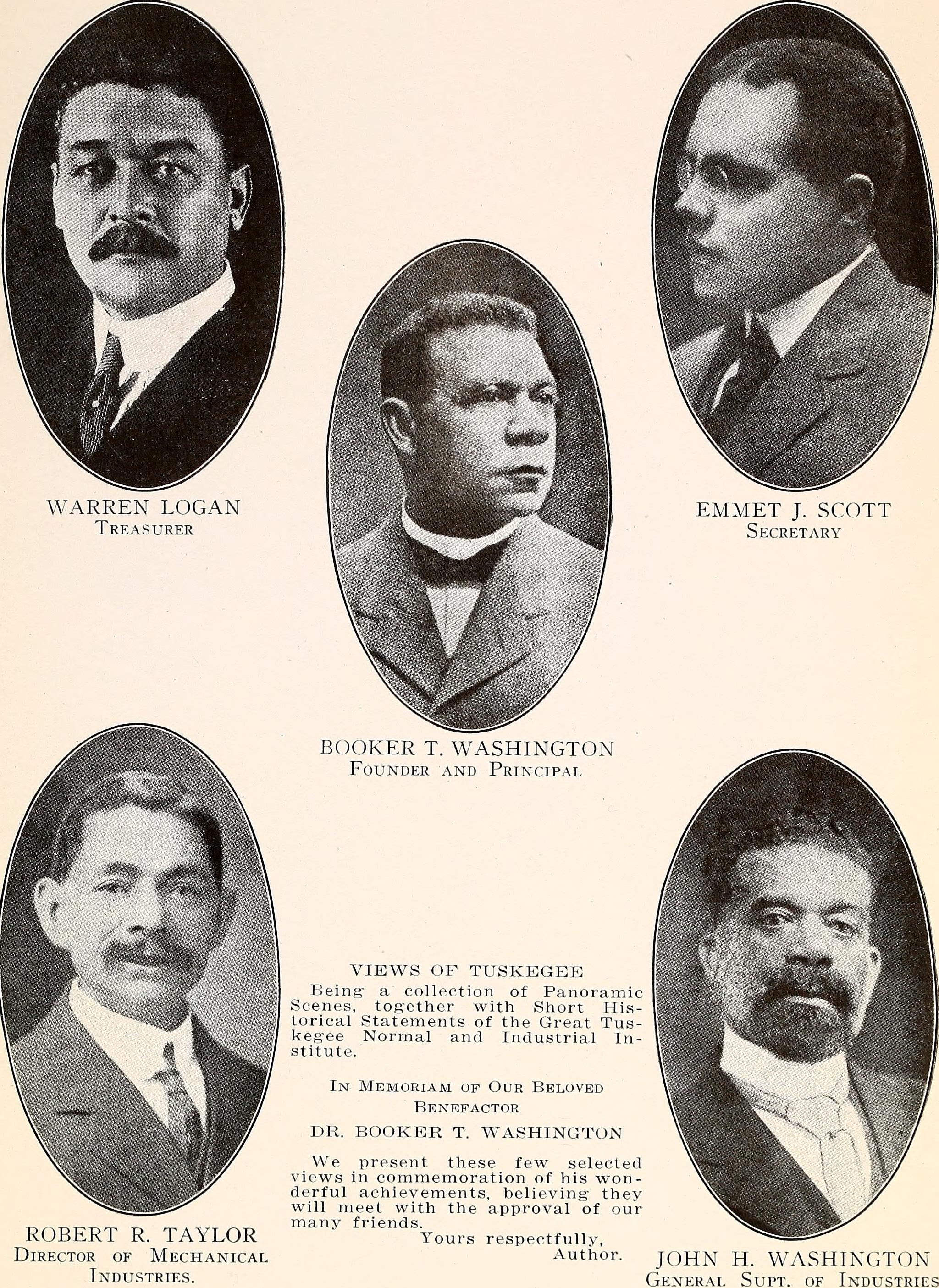
Leaders from Tuskegee Institute, honored at the Lincoln Jubilee

== See also ==
- American Negro Exposition, the 1940 diamond jubilee of Emancipation, also held at the Chicago Coliseum
