= Woodson African American Museum of Florida =

Museum and cultural center in St. Petersburg, Florida, US

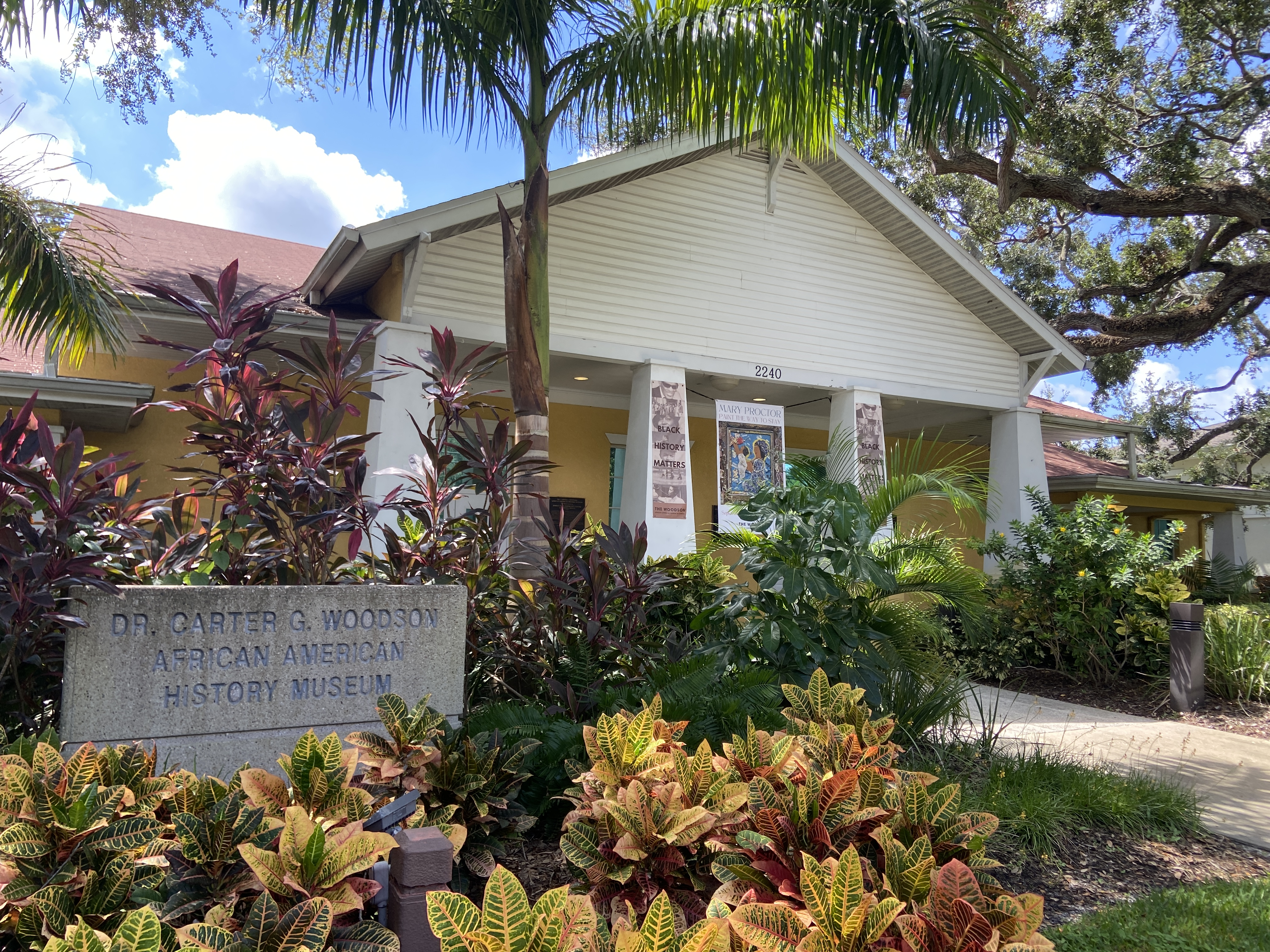
- Entrance to museum
- Established: 2006
- Location: 2240 9th Ave S, St. Petersburg, Florida 33712
- Coordinates: 27°45′39″N 82°39′50″W
- Type: Ethnic and Local History
- Website: woodsonmuseum.org

The Woodson African American Museum of Florida formerly known as the Dr. Carter G. Woodson African American Museum, is a cultural institution in St. Petersburg, Florida. It is named after the African American historian and civil rights activist Carter G. Woodson. The museum is located in southwest St. Petersburg, Florida in the Jordan Park district. The museum is of historical and cultural importance to the community of St. Petersburg, hosting a variety of exhibits and events. The paths of the museum's Legacy Garden were constructed with bricks containing the names of donors to the museum.

== History ==
Renovation to the original Jordan Park housing project developments led to the foundation of the Dr. Carter G. Woodson Museum in 2006. Twenty-seven million dollars from a Hope VI grant was awarded by HUD to the St. Petersburg Housing Authority in 1997 to help revitalize Jordan Park public housing. The museum building was previously used as the Jordan Park administrative offices. The St. Petersburg leadership Class of 2008 transformed a lot behind the museum into the garden space for special events. The garden was designed with the motto “leaving a legacy.”

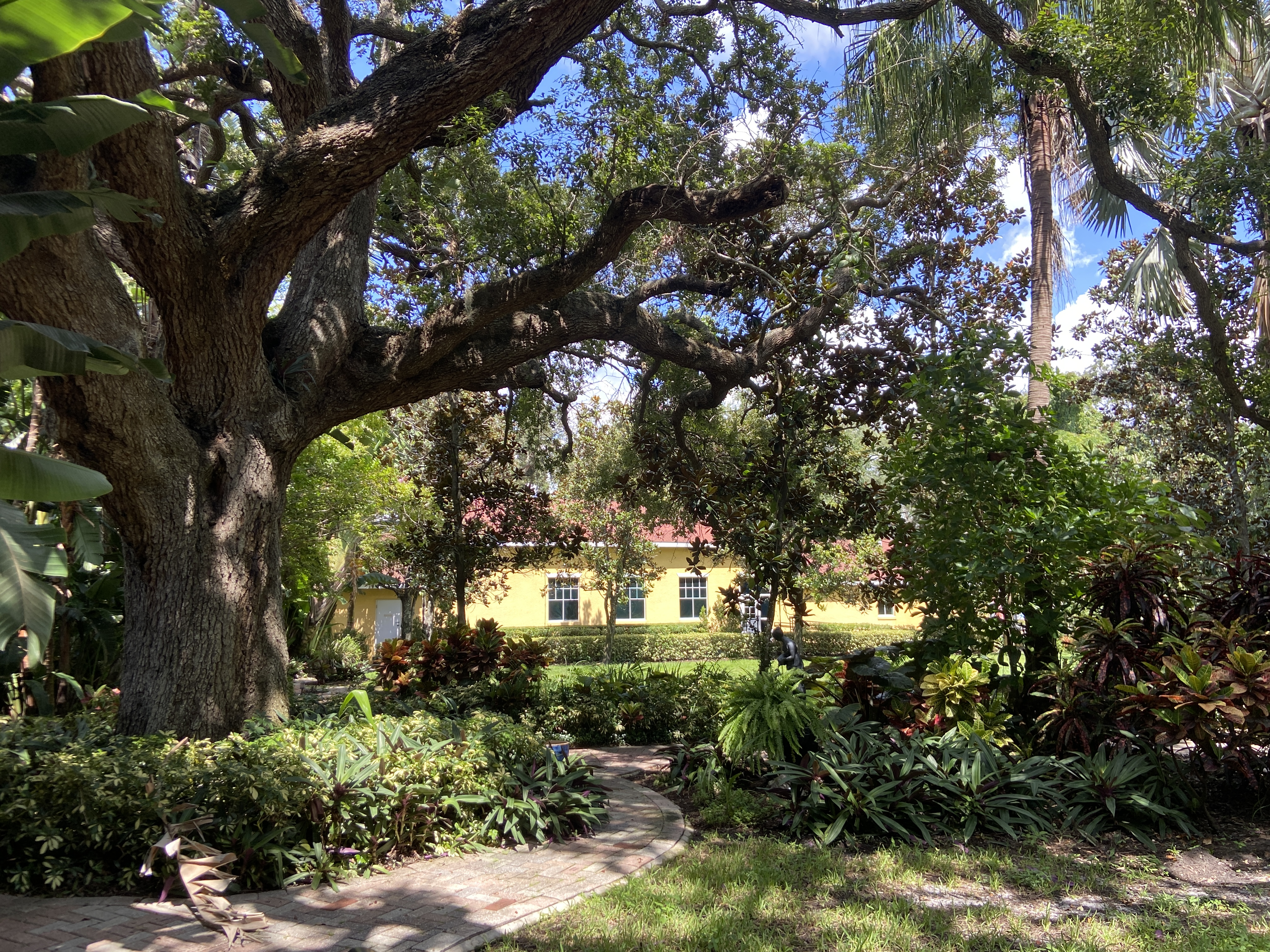
Legacy Garden

The name for the museum was determined by community children who nominated and voted for Woodson. Woodson was the second African American to graduate Harvard with a doctorate degree and helped establish Black History Month.

== Mission ==
The Museum's mission is "to preserve, present, and interpret African American history and to engage a broad and diverse audience through these activities" and "to promote an understanding among various groups that comprise the St. Petersburg community to enhance our ability as a society to respect, value diversity, and foster equal rights and social justice."

== Leadership ==
The current executive director of the museum is Terri Lipsey Scott, who won an impact award from the African American Heritage Association of St. Petersburg in 2017. The award was given for her dedication to the museum and the African American community of the city. The Museum's current board includes Ray Arsenault, Frechette Bradley, Kimberly Brown-Reynolds, Chiquita Clark, Roslyn Graham, Sheree Greer, Yolanda Hudson, Thelma McCloud, and Carol M. Motley.

== Programs ==
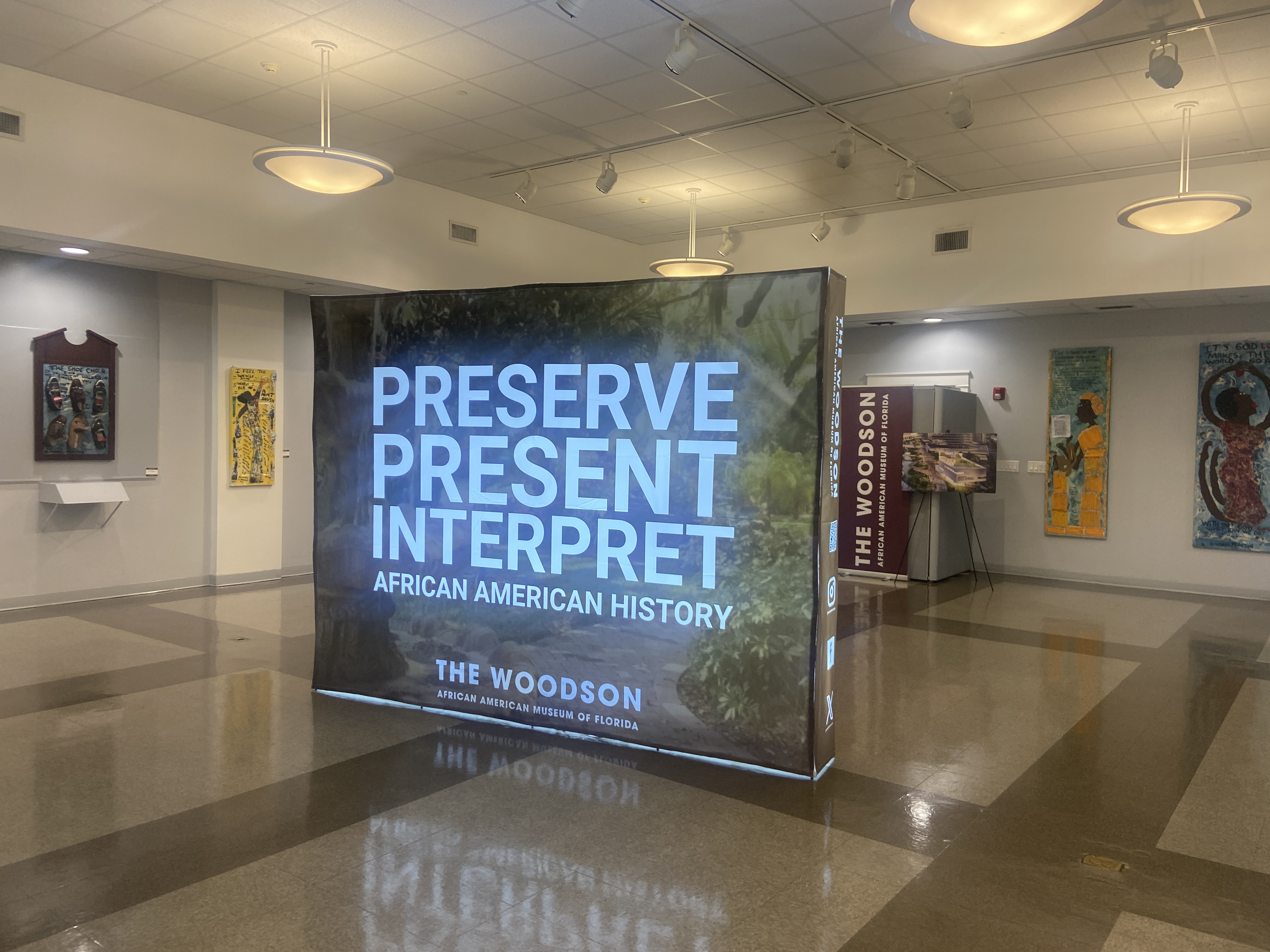
Gallery exhibit

The Museum displays temporary exhibits of artwork from African American artists from the state of Florida and other states such as Georgia. A permanent installation of artwork is currently being planned. The museum hosts a variety of events, such as Chatting with the Chief, weddings, birthdays, art walks, and festivals. The "Chatting with the Chief" events were launched in 2014 by the newly appointed Chief of Police, Anthony Holloway, who pledged open access to members of the community to ask him questions at the museum during designated times.

== Impact ==
The museum website notes that "The history of African Americans in the St. Petersburg community and throughout the African Diaspora will be the central focus of programming at the Museum. The Museum serves to preserve this rich history for present and future generations of St. Petersburg residents and visitors to St. Petersburg."
