= Alrutheus Ambush Taylor =

American historian

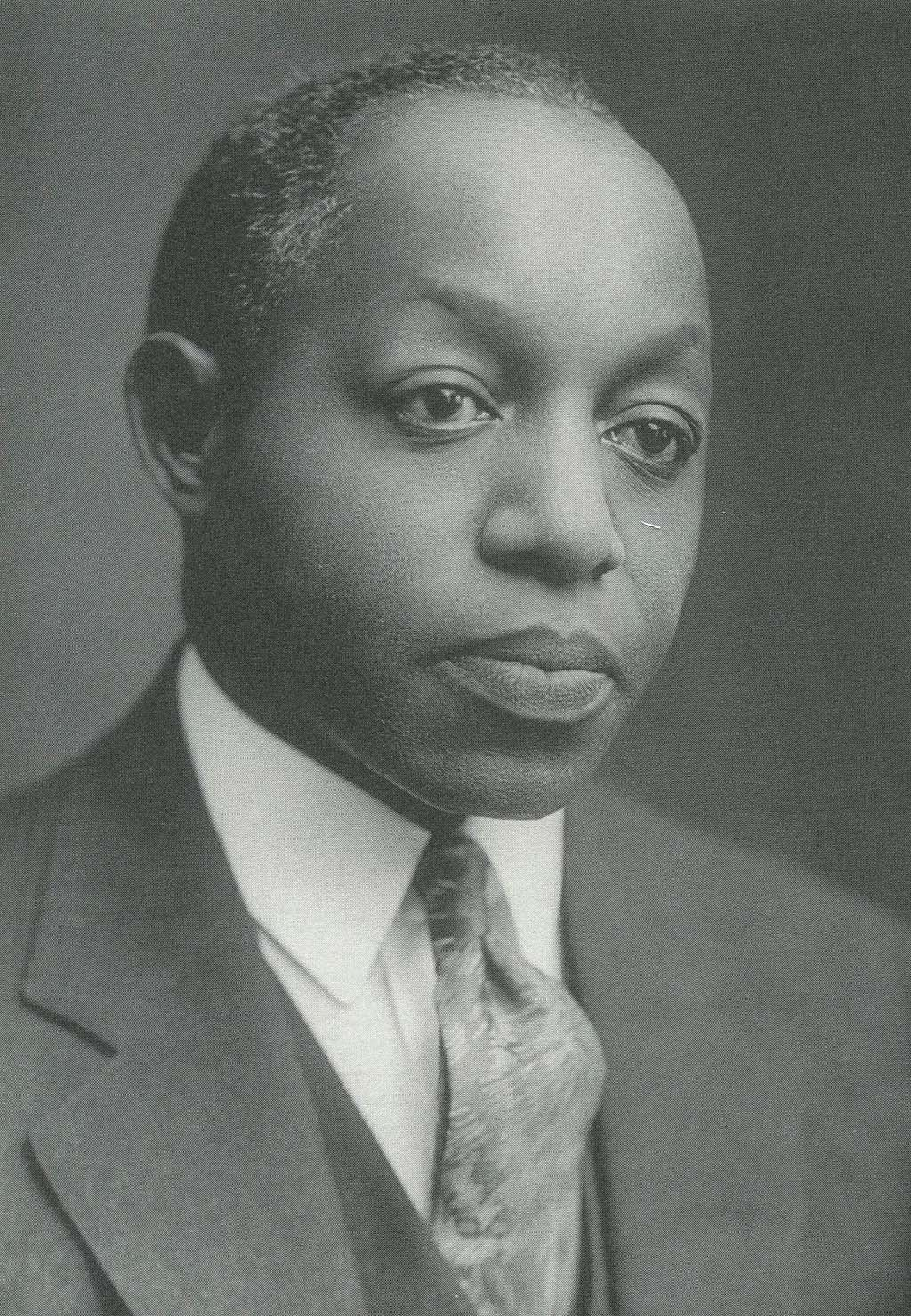
- Born: November 22, 1893; Washington, D.C., U.S.
- Died: June 4, 1954 (aged 60); Nashville, Tennessee, U.S.
- Spouses: Harriet Ethel Wilson (m. 1919; died 1941) Catherine Brummell Buchanan (m. 1943)

Academic background
- Education: University of Michigan (BA) Harvard University (MA, PhD)

Academic work
- Discipline: American History
- Sub-discipline: Reconstruction history

Alrutheus Ambush Taylor (1893–1954) was a historian from Washington D.C. He was a specialist in the history of blacks and segregation, especially during the Reconstruction Era. The Crisis cited him as a "painstaking scholar and authority on Negro history". An African-American, he taught at Tuskegee University in Tuskegee, Alabama, at the West Virginia Collegiate Institute in West Virginia, and at Fisk University in Nashville, Tennessee. Following a grant from the Laura Spelman Rockefeller Memorial Fund, Taylor began researching the role of African Americans in the South during Reconstruction. He authored The Negro in South Carolina During the Reconstruction in 1924, The Negro in the Reconstruction of Virginia in 1926, and The Negro in Tennessee, 1865-1880 in 1941.

== Early life and education ==
Taylor was born in Washington, D.C., the youngest of Lewis and Lucy Johnson Taylor's nine children. He enrolled in the University of Michigan in 1910 and graduated with a Bachelor of Arts in mathematics in 1916. Taylor was later rejected from the university's history graduate program by Ulrich B. Phillips, who cited Taylor's undergraduate focus in mathematics. Carter G. Woodson financed Taylor's Master of Arts at Harvard University, where he completed his thesis entitled "The Social Conditions and Treatment of Negroes in South Carolina, 1865-1880" in 1923. Taylor would finish his PhD at Harvard in 1935.

His earliest two published books, The Negro in South Carolina During Reconstruction in 1924, and The Negro in the Reconstruction of Virginia, challenged the Dunning School of Reconstruction historiography.

== Personal life ==
Taylor met his first wife, Harriet Ethel Wilson, while they were at university. She was president of the original Epsilon chapter of Alpha Kappa Alpha sorority at the University of Michigan in 1916. He became a member of Alpha Phi Alpha member through the Epsilon chapter at the University of Michigan as well. The two were wed on September 9, 1919. The two were married for nearly twenty-two years until Wilson's death from injuries sustained in a car crash on August 19, 1941. Taylor later established the Harriet Wilson Taylor Scholarship in her honor.

Taylor married a second time to Catherine Brummell Buchanan on September 9, 1943. Buchanan was a widow with five children and was the niece of Harriett Wilson Taylor. Buchanan's youngest son from her previous marriage was named after Taylor. Taylor never had any children in either of his marriages. Taylor died at Hubbard Hospital in Nashville, Tennessee, on June 4, 1954, at the age of 62. He was buried with his wife's family in Fowler, Indiana.

== Publications ==
- The Negro in South Carolina During the Reconstruction
- The Negro in the Reconstruction of Virginia
- The Negro in Tennessee, 1865-1880
- "Negro Congressmen a Generation After"
- "The Movement of Negroes from the East to the Gulf States from 1830 to 1850"
