= Jesse E. Moorland =

American minister and businessman (1863–1940)

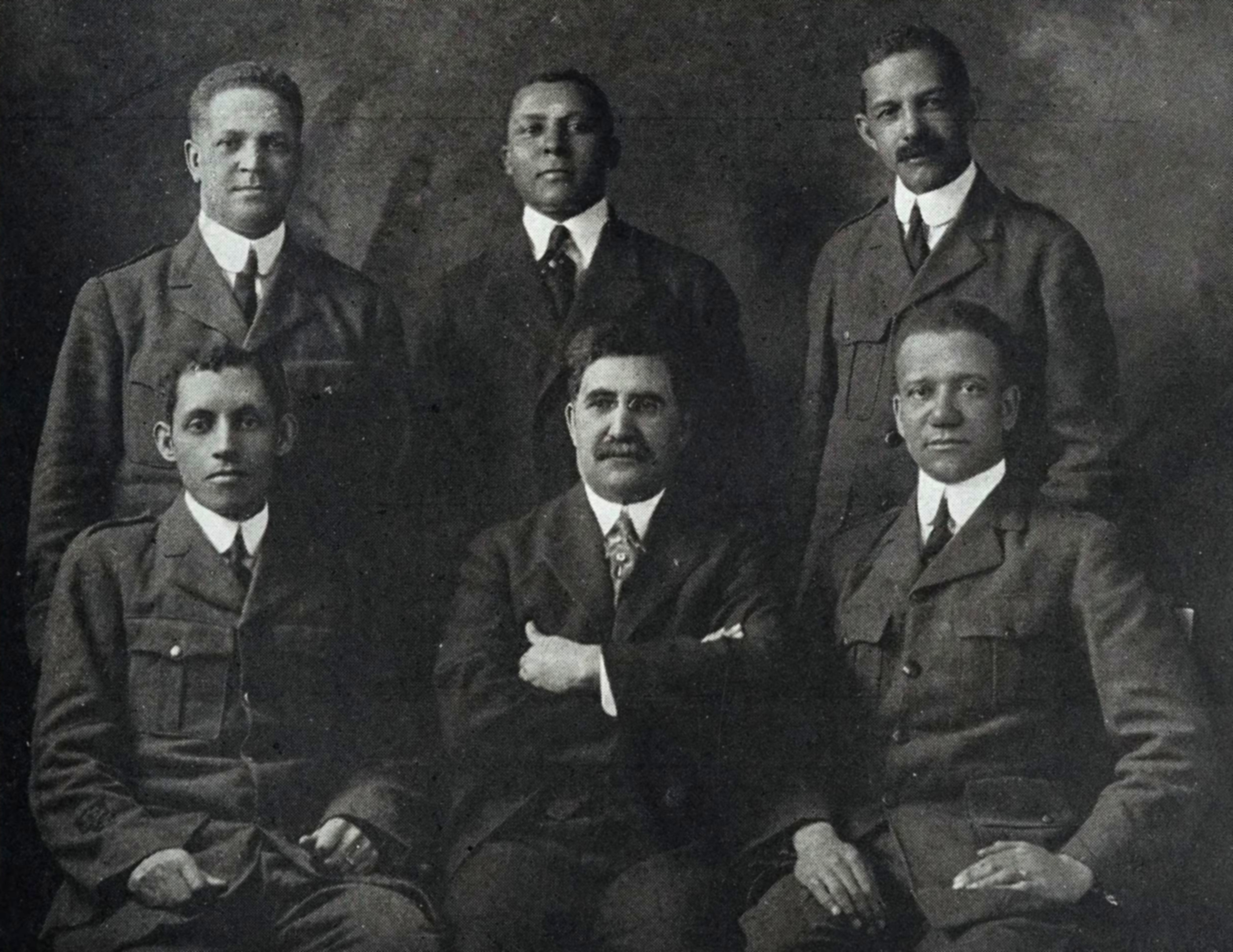
Moorland (seated, center) with other officials of the Department for Colored Troops of the Young Men’s Christian Association c. 1919

Jesse Edward Moorland (September 10, 1863 – April 30, 1940) was an American minister, community executive, civic leader and book collector.

== Biography ==
Born in Coldwater, Ohio, he was the only child of a farming family. Moorland attended Northwestern Normal University in Ada, Ohio. Then he moved to Washington, D.C., where he attended the Theological department of Howard University and earned his master's degree in 1891. He was ordained a Congressional minister. That same year he was hired as secretary of the Washington D.C. branch of the YMCA.

Moorland devoted himself to black social organizations, such as the National Afro-American League in the 1890s, and later the National Health Circle for Colored People, as important for building community strength. In 1914, Kelly Miller, a leading African-American intellectual, persuaded Moorland to donate his large private library on blacks in Africa and in the United States as the foundation for a proposed "Negro-Americana Museum and Library" at Howard University. This collection formed the foundation of the Moorland–Spingarn Research Center.

In 1885 in Ohio Moorland married Lucy C Woodson, who was a granddaughter of Thomas and Jemima Woodson.

Moorland was a member of Alpha Phi Alpha fraternity.

Jesse Moorland died in New York City at the age of 76.

He co-founded the Association for the Study of Negro Life and History (ASNLH) with Carter G. Woodson in 1915.
