= New Canton, Virginia =

Unincorporated community in Virginia, United States

New Canton
- Unincorporated community
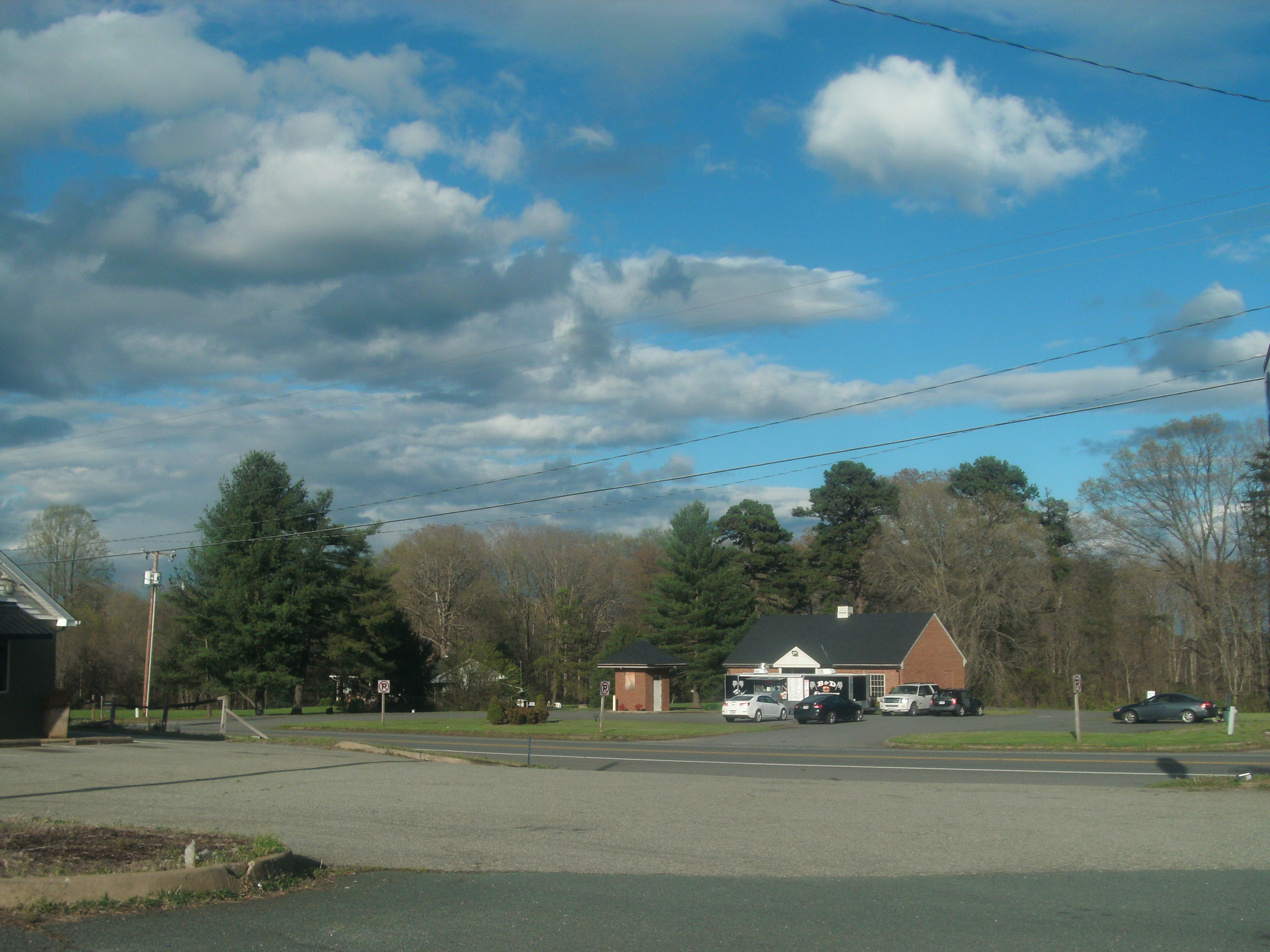
- Buildings in New Canton along U.S. Route 15, 2017

- Location within the Commonwealth of Virginia New Canton (the United States)
- Coordinates: 37°42′19″N 78°17′58″W
- Country: United States
- State: Virginia
- County: Buckingham
- Time zone: UTC−5 (Eastern (EST))
  - Summer (DST): UTC−4 (EDT)
- ZIP codes: 23123
- Area code: 434

New Canton is an unincorporated area in northeastern Buckingham County, Virginia, United States. It lies along U.S. Route 15 below the James River, northeast of the county seat of Buckingham. It has a post office with the ZIP code 23123.

== History ==
=== Settlement ===
In November 1793, the Virginia General Assembly decreed that a town to be named "New Canton" was to be established in Buckingham County on the James River, near the mouth of Bear Garden Creek. The 25 acres (10 ha) of land were located on the bluff above Cannon's Ferry, which had been in operation for many years. This land was to be laid out into lots of one half acre each, with "convenient cross streets running throughout". The main street and one angled cross street were the existing roads that served the ferry. The land was part of an original colonial land grant made to William Cannon on March 1, 1743. The land for the town was donated by Cannon's grandson, also named William, who hoped that the town would grow and prosper, causing his surrounding property to increase in value.

The original 45 lots were to be sold at public auction. Each purchaser was given seven years to build a "habitable dwelling house" on the lot. The dwelling was to be at least sixteen feet square and have either a brick or stone chimney. In addition, a tobacco warehouse was to be constructed and named "Cannon's Warehouse".

Initial sales were slow and nine years later, in 1802, the General Assembly adopted legislation to provide an additional five years for purchasers to build on their lots. The tobacco warehouse had been constructed by January 1804, on the only one acre lot in town. This warehouse later became known as the "Public" or "Publik" Warehouse and existed well into the 19th century.

In its early years, New Canton was known as a rowdy place, with as many as three saloons in a town of less than 40 houses. Iron and gold mines were in operation all around New Canton from the mid-18th until the mid-19th century. The remains of the iron foundry and several mines still exist today.

=== Mid-19th century ===
The only church ever built in New Canton was Trinity Presbyterian which was constructed in 1840. It still exists in the original building as a functioning church. A private one-room Catholic chapel was constructed by local merchant John Thomas McKenna in the mid-1880s. It later served as the New Canton post office until the mid-1960s and it also exists to this day.

In 1840, the James River and Kanawha Canal was constructed adjacent to the north bank of the river (opposite New Canton) and opened to traffic. The canal was used by packet and freight boats which replaced the earlier shallow-draft batteau boats used before the canal for commerce. These boats brought goods and passengers to and from Richmond and points beyond. A bridge was built to connect the canal to the New Canton side.

Long a dream of early Virginians such as George Washington, who was a surveyor early in his career, the canal was never completed as envisioned. However, the canal in the area of New Canton was used until both it and the bridge were destroyed by Union forces during the Civil War (1861–1865). The canal was repaired after the war, but traffic never returned to pre-war levels as railroads were becoming more numerous and popular.

After many years of attempts to compete successfully with the ever-expanding network of railroads, the James River and Kanawha Canal was conveyed to a new railroad company by a deed dated March 4, 1880. Railroad construction workers promptly started laying tracks on the towpath. The new Richmond and Allegheny Railroad offered a water-level route from the Appalachian Mountains just east of West Virginia near Jackson's River Station (now Clifton Forge) through the Blue Ridge Mountains at Balcony Falls to Richmond. In 1888 the railroad was leased, and later purchased, by Collis P. Huntington's Chesapeake and Ohio Railway.

=== Late 19th and early 20th century ===
In the mid-1880s major change came to New Canton when a railroad bridge was constructed over the James River, connecting the Bremo Bluff side to the New Canton side. A new road was constructed a few hundred feet to the west of the old ferry road to service the new bridge. Planks were laid on the bridge which allowed wagon and foot traffic as well as rail traffic. The locals named the bridge the "Combination Bridge" because of this. The old ferry and its connecting road fell into disuse and were gradually abandoned.

New Canton never became a "boom town" but it did have considerable commerce and enterprise in the 19th and early 20th centuries. There was a tan yard, a grist mill, a tobacco warehouse, a saw mill, several bars, a hotel, several general stores and a post office. In the early 20th century, there were gas pumps, a Ford automobile dealership and an orchard as well.

=== Contemporary history ===
As motorcars became popular early in the 20th century, they too began using the bridge and the road down to the river became a highway for the ever-increasing motor vehicle traffic. The main highway that was to become U.S. Route 15 actually ran right through New Canton. This brought a boom in commerce to New Canton but it was to be short lived. In 1934, a new highway bridge opened a few hundred feet to the west of the town, effectively a bypass isolating New Canton from through traffic.

Commerce gradually wound down in the latter half of the 20th century. The village now has no commercial establishments and there are less than ten occupied houses on the original 45 lots. The most active part of town is the post office which has remained in continuous operation, in several different buildings, since the early 19th century. This post office serves a wide area around the village itself.

== Notable person ==
Carter G. Woodson (1875–1950) was an African-American who was born and raised in the New Canton area of Buckingham County. He became a noted teacher, educator, and historian. He is best known for establishing Black History Week, which has evolved into Black History Month. Dr. Woodson is known as the Father of Black History.
