= The Negro in Our History =

1922 non-fiction book by Carter G. Woodson

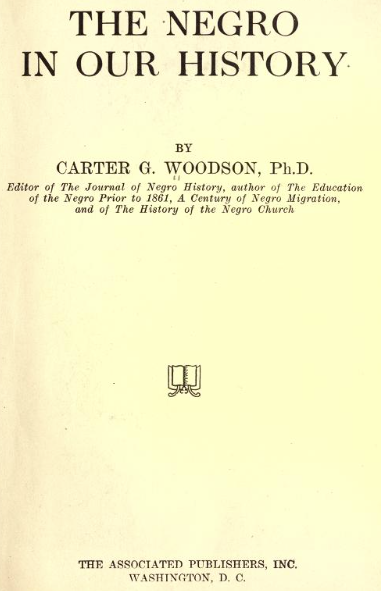
- Title page for The Negro in Our History (1922)
- Author: Carter G. Woodson
- Genre: Non-fiction
- Publisher: Associated Publishers
- Publication date: 1922
- Publication place: United States
- OCLC: 3081130
- Followed by: updated and expanded editions

The Negro in Our History is a non-fiction book of history by Carter G. Woodson and published in 1922. According to philosopher Alain Locke, Woodson's book was one of the "select class of books that have brought about a revolution in the human mind".
