= The Journal of African American History =

Academic journal founded in 1916

Journal of African American History
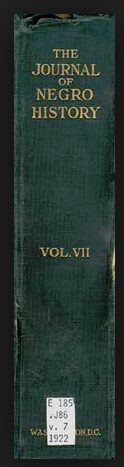
- Spine of Volume 7
- Discipline: History
- Language: English
- Edited by: Bertis English

Publication details
- Former name: The Journal of Negro History
- History: 1916–present
- Publisher: University of Chicago Press on behalf of the Association for the Study of African American Life and History (United States)
- Frequency: Quarterly

Standard abbreviations
- ISO 4: J. Afr. Am. Hist.

Indexing
- ISSN: 1548-1867
- LCCN: 2006-236700
- OCLC no.: 60628423

Links
- Journal homepage; Current issues

The Journal of African American History, formerly The Journal of Negro History (1916–2001), is a quarterly academic journal covering African-American life and history. It was founded in 1916 by Carter G. Woodson. The journal is owned and overseen by the Association for the Study of African American Life and History (ASALH) and was established in 1916 by Woodson and Jesse E. Moorland. The journal publishes original scholarly articles on all aspects of the African-American experience. The journal annually publishes more than sixty reviews of recently published books in the fields of African and African-American life and history. As of 2018, the Journal is published by the University of Chicago Press on behalf of the ASALH.

== History ==
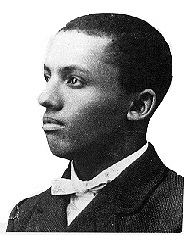
Carter G. Woodson, "father of African-American history" and founder of the Journal

The Journal of African American History (formally The Journal of Negro History) was one of the first scholarly journals to cover African-American history. It was founded in January 1916 by Carter G. Woodson, an African-American historian and journalist. The journal was and is a publication of the Association for the Study of African American Life and History, an organization founded by Woodson. The journal was the dominant scholarly source for the study of African American history at the time of its inception, because there were no other such texts. The journal gave black scholars the chance to publish articles examining African-American history and culture while also documenting the current black experience in the United States. While the journal mainly published the work of black authors and encouraged their academic success, it was also an outlet for white scholars who had different views than their counterparts. Woodson's efforts to cover African-American history at a time when it was unacknowledged has led him to receive the nickname "Father of African American History".

=== Carter G. Woodson ===
Carter G. Woodson (1875–1950) was a professor and historian at Howard University. He was among the first black scholars, with other notable figures such as W. E. B. Du Bois, to receive a doctoral degree. He was a pioneer in the field of black history and African-American studies. After getting his Ph.D. in history from Harvard University, he joined the faculty at Howard University. At the start of his career, black history was not recognized as separate field of study. Woodson was one of the first black scholars to identify this need and do something about it. "He didn't just see a need, he moved to fill the need", said Carol Adams, CEO of the Chicago Museum of African American History. "It wasn't easy to get your work published if you were an African-American scholar, for example, so he started a journal and then a press."

=== Woodson and the journal's impact on Black History Month ===
In 1915, Woodson co-founded the Association for the Study of Negro Life and History (ASNLH). Just as the name of the Journal of Negro History was changed to the Journal of African American History, ASNLH's name was later changed to the Association for the Study of African American Life and History (ASALH). Along with Woodson himself, this non-profit organization, founded in Chicago and based in Washington, D.C., was responsible for the creation of African American History Week in 1926 to bring attention to the importance of black history. The week that was chosen coincided with the birthdays of Frederick Douglass and Abraham Lincoln. African American History Week built upon the work of The Journal of Negro History in highlighting the need to examine black history and celebrate African-American culture. The journal is published by the ASALH. Woodson's work in establishing both The Journal of Negro History and African American History Week led directly to what is now known as Black History Month. Black History Month is recognized every year in February, still covering the week of Frederick Douglass's and Abraham Lincoln's birthdays as Woodson originally intended.

=== Notable figures ===
Since its conception in 1926, the Journal of African American History has featured and published the work of notable scholars including Benjamin Quarles, John Hope Franklin, and W. E. B. Du Bois. Jesse E. Moorland and activist Arthur Spingarn also made notable contributions to the study of black history by, among other things, donating novels and manuscripts to the library at Howard University. The Moorland-Spingarn Research Center at Howard University is named for them. Another notable promoter of the study of black history, Joe R. Feagin, was the president of the American Sociological Association, did research on racism in society, and advanced the scholarly tradition originated by Carter Woodson, the father of African-American history.

=== The journal and women of color ===
The Journal of African American History played a vital role for women of color in the 1900s. Before it was commonplace for women to be openly welcomed in the world of academia, the Journal of African American History (still known then as The Journal of Negro History) provided women of color with an outlet to publish their work without the ridicule of others. The first black female historians paved their way using the Journal of Negro History. Female authors contributed nine percent of the articles published in The Journal of Negro History, compared to an average of only three percent in other notable journals of the time, such as Mississippi Valley Historical Review or the Journal of Southern History. The Journal of Negro History was therefore quite revolutionary in its time by allowing more female authors to contribute to the journal. One of the most notable examples is Marion Thompson Wright, who received a doctoral degree in history. She published her own work on blacks in New Jersey in The Journal of Negro History.

=== The journal's publishing institutions ===
The Journal of African American History is owned by the Association for the Study of African American Life and History. In 2018, the editor V. P. Franklin, who began working for his alma mater, Harvard University along with Harvard's Evelyn Brooks Higginbotham, a well-known historian in African-American studies, signed a deal with the University of Chicago Press to have it publish the journal on behalf of the ASLAH.

=== Current editor ===
Bertis English, a history professor at Alabama State University, is the editor of the journal as of December 2023.
