= George Cleveland Hall =

American physician and activist (1864–1930)

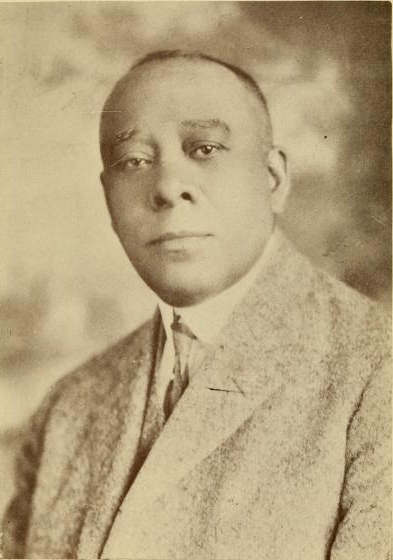
Hall, c. 1922

George Cleveland Hall (22 February 1864, Ypsilanti, – 17 June 1930, Chicago) was an American physician who became a prominent humanitarian activist. He headed the Urban League in Chicago of which he went on to become vice-president. In 1915 he was a founding member of the Association for the Study of Negro Life and History.

He was educated in the Chicago public schools, and in 1882 attended Lincoln University in Pennsylvania, from which he graduated in 1886. He then attended Bennett Medical College, graduating with a medical degree in 1888. He worked at the Provident Hospital and established his medical practice in Chicago in 1900.

In 1919 he was appointed to the Chicago Commission on Race Relations.
