= The Mis-Education of the Negro =

1933 book by Dr. Carter G. Woodson

- First edition
- Author: Carter G. Woodson
- Language: English
- Genre: African-American Studies
- Publisher: The Associated Publishers
- Publication date: 1933
- Publication place: United States
- Media type: Print (Hardcover, Paperback, E-Book)
- Pages: 108
- ISBN: 978-1-60459-227-6

The Mis-Education of the Negro is a 1933 nonfiction book written by Dr. Carter G. Woodson.

== Summary ==
Woodson's thesis is that Black people in the early 20th century were being culturally indoctrinated, rather than taught, in American schools. This conditioning, he claims, causes Black people to become dependent and to seek out inferior places in the greater society of which they are a part. He challenges his readers to become autodidacts and to "do for themselves", regardless of what they were taught:

History shows that it does not matter who is in power... those who have not learned to do for themselves and have to depend solely on others never obtain any more rights or privileges in the end than they did in the beginning.

—Chapter 14

Woodson elaborated further:

When you control a man's thinking you do not have to worry about his actions. You do not have to tell him not to stand here or go yonder. He will find his 'proper place' and will stay in it. You do not need to send him to the back door. He will go without being told. In fact, if there is no back door, he will cut one for his special benefit. His education makes it necessary.

—Preface

== Content ==
Chapter 1—"The Seat Of The Trouble": In this chapter Woodson explains how African Americans can feel out of place as they are indoctrinated to despise themselves within the educational system. He identifies how African Americans are often influenced to become a "good negro" in order to become successful, and this ideology urges them to downplay their "blackness" to advance socially, but being educated and moving up the social ladder does not eliminate one's blackness. This problem could possibly be avoided if African Americans had equal opportunity to learn about their culture and black history.

Chapter 2—"How We Missed The Mark": Woodson explains how the educational system failed to support African Americans because of how their schools were unable to properly teach them, when compared to predominantly white schools that were fully furnished and had the means to give their students the right education. Woodson believed that African Americans should experience different means of education to develop and show their individual skills rather than to be educated practically.

Chapter 3—"How We Drifted Away From The Truth": Woodson discusses how African Americans are separated from the truth of their actual contributions to history due to it being "white-washed". He analyzed many cases in which this makes white people believe they are superior by taking away the important contributions from black people. He also shows how black teachers are often no help in fixing the problem as they continue to teach white-washed versions of history to the future generations of students.

Chapter 4—"Education Under Outside Control": Woodson speaks on how African Americans are given educationally less valuable opportunities despite whether the institution is historically black or predominately white. Woodson believes that equal education opportunities have an effect on individuals and the life that they create for themselves. He also encourages African Americans to create better opportunities in many aspects for themselves so they can live better lives. "The program for the uplift of the negro in this country must be based upon a scientific study of the negro from within to develop in him the power to do for himself what his oppressors will never do for him."

Chapter 5—"The Failure to Make a Living" highlights a lot of the problems that Black people who attend college face when presented with how to apply that knowledge to the working world, or more specifically owning and operating a business. One of the main problems that Woodson introduces is the lack of support systems that many black Americans don't have, especially when compared to those of a similar standing who happen to be white.

Chapter 6—"The Educated Negro Leaves the Masses" discusses the estrangement that many educated black people have from the black church and the lack of support the black church receives from the educated as a result. According to Woodson, some of the things educated black people are doing instead of supporting the black church are switching to predominantly white denominations, or not attending church altogether. Woodson emphasizes the importance of the black church as "the only institution that the race controls".

Chapter 7—"Dissension and Weakness", Woodson discusses the lack of tolerance those in rural areas have for dissension and differences in denomination around them. Woodson, once again, refers back to the lack of guidance and presence educated Black people have in the Black church and the effects of it; which includes children becoming more involved with gambling, drinking, and smoking.

Chapter 8—"Professional Education Discouraged" discusses the discouragement many Black Americans face in academic settings. Some of the prime examples Woodson brings to light are how black Americans are told there will be no job opportunities in particular fields should they choose to study them, being told they are not fit for certain fields, and being discredited or ignored despite being well educated in a particular field.

Chapter 9—"Political Education Neglected", begins with some examples as to how African Americans have been previously kept from learning about American politics, one example being when a bill that would print the Constitution of the United States in all schools was turned down because "it would never do to have Negroes study the Constitution of the United States." Woodson also lays out a brief history of other times when African Americans were kept from learning about laws that govern their everyday life and the policies that were keeping them subservient.

Chapter 10—"The Loss of Vision" describes how according to Woodson Black America has lost sight of a common goal. In this chapter he brings up how in what he calls "our so-called democracy, we are accustomed to give the majority what they want rather than educate them to understand what is best for them. We do not show the Negro to overcome segregation, but we teach them how to accept it as final and just." Woodson expresses the need for African Americans to overcome segregation by proving that they are just as good as an asset to society as white Americans.

Chapter 11—"The Need for Service Rather than Leadership" describes the stifling of African Americans' ambition and roadblocks that keep them from becoming leaders. Woodson also lays out the reasons as to why this is, but mostly shifting the blame to the lack of unity within the African American community; often referring back to points made in "The Educated Negro Leaves the Masses" and how there is too much internal conflict and dissension within the community to allow for upward mobility for the community as a whole.

In Chapter 12—"Hirelings in the Places of Public Servants", Woodson brings up the lack of African Americans in positions of power in the workplace. Woodson brings up many examples of African Americans put in management positions not being given the same respect and attention their white counterparts are given, and why this is.

Chapters "Understanding the Negro", "The New Program", and "Vocational Guidance" address multiple themes. Woodson talks about lack of negro presence throughout the school system and how that not only affects black students but white students as well. A good portion of that comes from black people not being mentioned at all in the school's curriculum. The only time they are mentioned is to be demonized or if something that is negative; because of the false information black students are given about their people they seem to try to assimilate with the white population, then in turn continue to circulate these negative views on their own people. Woodson actually conducted an interview with a professor of a black college who, when asked how he planned to teach black students about their people, said "We do not offer here any course in Negro history, Negro literature, or race relations. "We study the Negro along with other people." When Woodson questions him on his answer he then goes on to say "Why do you emphasize the special study of the Negro?" "Why is it necessary to give the race special attention in the press, on the rostrum, or in the schoolroom?" This is the mindset that most teachers he came across or looked over had towards black studies and how it should be taught to black children.

In Chapter 13—"The New Type of Professional Man Required", Woodson discusses the many hardships black lawyers and doctors encounter in their professional careers. One of the problems he discusses for black lawyers would be how they are often forced to focus on the particular laws that disproportionately affect African Americans. He seems to take issue with many black doctors and their motivations for going into such work: He says, "Too many Negroes go into medicine and dentistry for selfish purposes, hoping thereby to increase their income and spend it on joyous living." He also discusses the exclusion of African Americans from the arts.

Chapter 14—"Higher Strivings In The Service Of The Country". Woodson emphasizes his political views. Woodson believed that African Americans should not just focus on themselves and address only issues that apply to them, but should address issues that apply to everyone

Chapter 15—"Reward the dead for some distant favors from the past" Woodson tries to inform African Americans that because their ancestors were influenced by—and died—for certain rights in the past does not mean those ancestors' political leanings should be continued in the present. Woodson argued strongly that African Americans should not endorse a particular political party because of this. He strongly felt like this because of some African Americans siding with Republicans only because of Abraham Lincoln. Not only was he strong about politics but he was also strong about having African Americans participating more in the United States economy, because he believed that African Americans playing a role in the US economy would improve their social life and makes others want to contribute to the advancement of society. Woodson stated that African Americans should pursue economic and social change.

In chapter 18, "The Study of the Negro", Woodson emphasizes the importance of again knowing the history and the importance of African American culture. He strongly believed that Blacks need to study their history more. Woodson believed that Blacks have come to hate their history due to slavery and being treated unfairly, but are taught to learn and respect other cultures' history.

== Reception ==
Many praised Woodson and his work as a glimpse into the problems that plague African Americans' social advancement.

Ron Daniels, with the Michigan City said, "Carter G. Woodson, one of our most distinguished historians, and the founder of the Association for the Study of Negro Life and History, was convinced that the dilemma of racial consciousness and identity was not an accident. [...] Our history, culture and identity should serve as a basic for a group cohesion, and the collective pursuit of an African-American agenda for moral, social, economic and political advancement."

Another had to say, "The result was a caustic and uncompromising litany that seemed to go on forever. Negro education, Woodson charged, clung to a defunct 'machine method' based on the misguided assumption that 'education is merely a process of imparting information.' it failed to inspire black students and 'did not bring their minds into harmony with life as they must face it'. Theories of Negro inferiority were 'drilled' into black pupils in virtually every classroom they entered. And the more education blacks received, the more 'estranged from the masses' they became."

Linda Strong-Lee, writing in The Journal of Black Studies, said of Woodson, "Carter G. Woodson believed that education was much more than the transferral of knowledge from teacher to student: He believed that authentic education would not only teach students to recite information but also enable students to ask difficult epistemological and ontological questions about life, political systems, social and economic inequities, and the very purpose of humankind."

The title of Lauryn Hill's 1998 album The Miseducation of Lauryn Hill is a reference to the book.

== See also ==
- Education during the slave period
