= Association for the Study of African American Life and History =

Learned society

- Formation: September 9, 1915; 111 years ago
- Founders: Carter G. Woodson, William B. Hartgrove, George Cleveland Hall, Alexander L. Jackson, and James E. Stamps
- Founded at: Chicago
- Legal status: Non-profit
- Purpose: History, sociology
- Headquarters: Washington, DC
- Location: United States
- Website: asalh.org
- Formerly called: Association for the Study of Negro Life and History; Association for the Study of Afro-American Life and History

The Association for the Study of African American Life and History (ASALH) is a learned society dedicated to the study and appreciation of African-American History. The association was founded in Chicago on September 9, 1915, during the National Half Century Exposition and Lincoln Jubilee, as the Association for the Study of Negro Life and History (ASNLH) by Carter G. Woodson, William B. Hartgrove, George Cleveland Hall, Alexander L. Jackson, and James E. Stamps, and incorporated in Washington, D.C., on October 2, 1915. The association is based in Washington, D.C. In 1973, ASNLH was renamed the Association for the Study of Afro-American Life and History.

ASALH's official mission is "to promote, research, preserve, interpret, and disseminate information about Black life, history, and culture to the global community." Its official vision is "to be the premier Black Heritage and learned society with a diverse and inclusive membership supported by a strong network of national and international branches to continue the Woodson legacy."

ASALH created Negro History Week in 1926. Woodson selected the week to coincide with the birthdays of Frederick Douglass and Abraham Lincoln. Each year, he established a national theme for the celebration. Since 1976, ASALH extended the celebration for all of February.

The organization publishes The Journal of African American History (formerly The Journal of Negro History) and the Black History Bulletin (formerly the Negro History Bulletin). In 2005, ASALH established the ASALH Press, reissuing Carter G. Woodson's Mis-Education of the Negro. The same year ASALH established The Woodson Review, a magazine that promotes its Annual Black History Theme, including it as part of its Black History Kit. In 2005, ASALH discovered a previously unpublished manuscript by its founder, Carter G. Woodson, and published it in a special edition as Carter G. Woodson's Appeal: The Lost Manuscript Edition.

ASALH is a membership organization with more than 25 branches.

== ASALH conventions ==
Annually the organization strives to continue its research focus as well as efforts to share and disseminate historical information—for which the organization was founded. One of the major ways the organization focuses it resources in this area is with the ASALH annual convention that takes place in the fall (usually September or October) ASALH hosted its first convention in 1917, two years after the organization was founded. At that time the convention was biennial. During the first convention, Woodson stated the goals of the organization as he saw them: "The organization primary responsibilities would be the publishing of an historical magazine, researching the achievements of Negros, directing a home study program along with writing and publishing books and monographs. Charles Harris Wesley, one of the organization's early developers, was not pleased with the first convention because more race solvers and educators attended than historians, which is in opposition to ASALH’s vision as an historical research society."

Each year, the location of the convention rotates to a major US city and coincides with the annual black history theme. The 2008 convention took place in Birmingham, Alabama, the 2009 convention took place in Cincinnati, Ohio, the 2010 convention was held in Raleigh, North Carolina, the 2011 conference was held in Richmond, Virginia, and the 2012 convention from September 26 to September 30 in Pittsburgh, Pennsylvania. According to the Association, the annual convention draws over 1,000 participants.

At the convention, ASALH organizes plenary sessions and workshops, facilitates scholarly presentations selected from the "Call for Papers", sponsors a black history tour of famous landmarks in the city, and hosts a youth day for high school students in the area.

=== Derived organizations ===
Numerous organizations have risen out of the ASALH conventions. One such example is the Association of Black Women Historians (ABWH), founded at the 1977 ASALH convention in Washington, DC. The ABWH was founded by Rosalyn Terborg-Penn, Eleanor Smith, and Elizabeth Parker.

The National Council of Black Studies was also conceptualized at an ASALH convention.

== See also ==
- Negro Society for Historical Research
