= Ed Defore Sports Complex =

Sports complex in Macon, Georgia

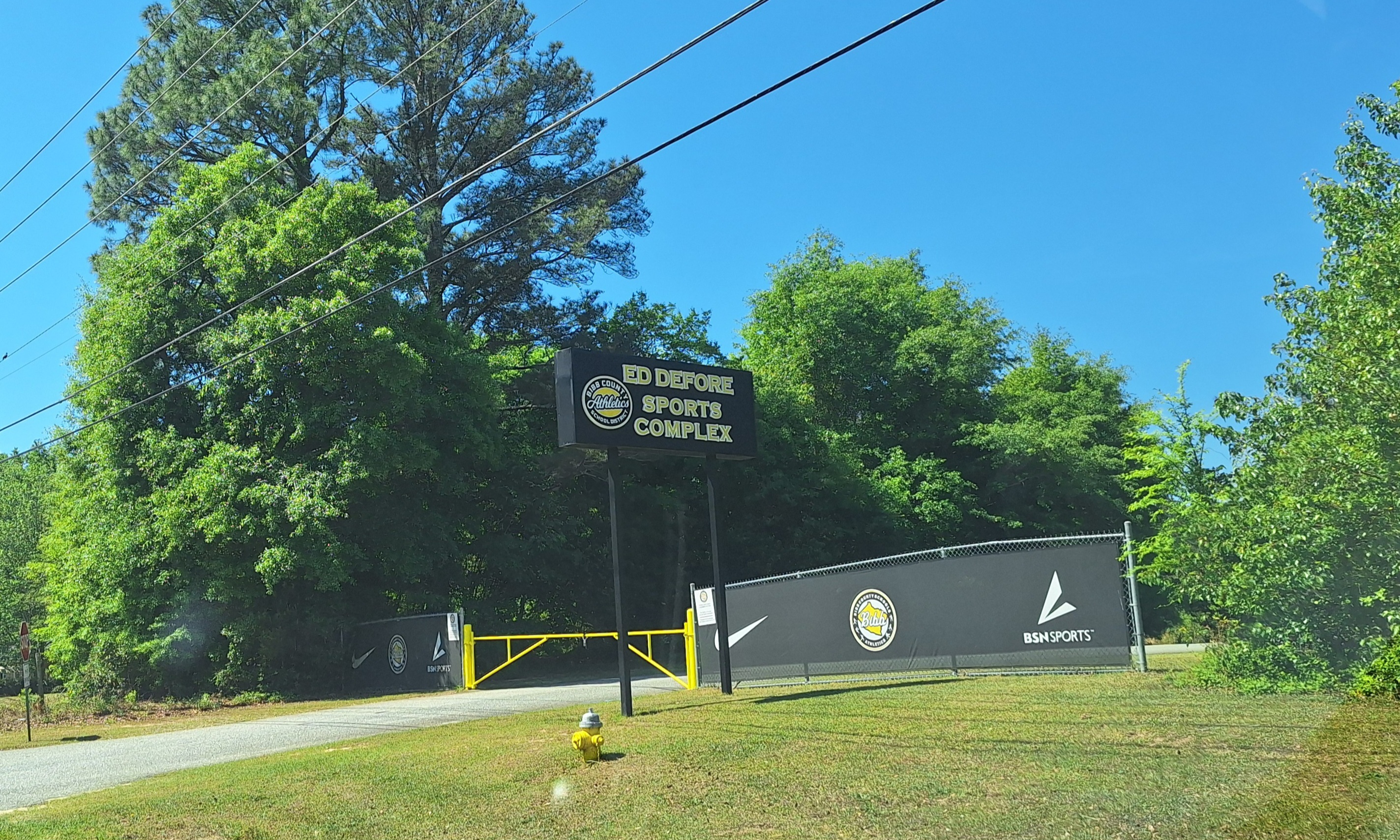
- Interactive map of Ed Defore Sports Complex
- Location: 2851 Heath Rd; Macon, Georgia 31206
- Coordinates: 32.818401°N 83.752895°W
- Owner: Bibb County School District
- Operator: Bibb County School District
- Capacity: 10,000

Tenants
- Westside Seminoles (GHSA-AAAA); Central Chargers (GHSA-AAA); Howard Huskies (GHSA-AAAA); Rutland Hurricanes (GHSA-AAA); Northeast Raiders (GHSA-AAA); Southwest Patriots (GHSA-AAA)

The Ed Defore Sports Complex is located in Macon, Georgia, next to Westside High School.

Formerly the "Bibb County Sports Complex", the name was changed in 2008 to honor Macon City Council member Ed Defore, who served on the city council and later the county commission from 1971 until 2016.

== History ==
The complex opened in the early 2000s with a football stadium, soccer field, and two baseball diamonds. In 2018, the combined Macon-Bibb county government approved the sale of the sports complex from county ownership to the Bibb County Board of Education for $3.8 million.

The football stadium added an upgraded scoreboard with a jumbotron, and the field was converted from grass to artificial turf in 2019 for a cost of $2 million.
