= Canty (surname) =

Canty is a surname. Notable people with the surname include:

- Anthony Canty (born 1991), German basketball player
- Brendan Canty (born 1966), American drummer for the band Fugazi
- Chris Canty (defensive lineman) (born 1982), American football defensive end in the National Football League
- Chris Canty (defensive back) (born 1976), American football defensive back in the Arena Football League
- Dominique Canty (born 1977), American professional women's basketball player
- Graham Canty (born 1980), Irish footballer
- Hattie Canty (1933–2012), African-American labor activist
- James Canty, American musician
- James Canty III (born 1992), American chess player
- James M. Canty (1865–1964), American educator, school administrator, and businessperson
- John G. Canty (1917–1992), American thoroughbred horse racing trainer
- Kevin Canty (author) (born 1953), American author and academic
- Kevin Canty (hurler) (born 1986), Irish hurler
- Marcus Canty (born 1991), American R&B and soul singer
- Mary Agnes Canty (1879–1950), New Zealand teacher, catholic nun, and nursing school matron
- Mary Beth Canty, American politician
- Thomas Canty (born 1952), illustrator and book designer
- Thomas Canty (judge) (1854–1920), American jurist

== See also ==
- Canti (surname)
