= Canty =

Canty may refer to:

== As a surname ==
- Canty (surname), a list of people
- Tom Canty, the pauper in the novel The Prince and the Pauper by Mark Twain

== Places ==
- Canty, Alabama, U.S., place in Alabama
- Canty Bay, small inlet and coastal hamlet on the northern coast of East Lothian, Scotland
- Canty Point, on the Antarctic Peninsula
- Canty House, Kanawha County, West Virginia, United States

== See also ==
- Canti (disambiguation)
