= Justin Reid =

American football player (born 1997)

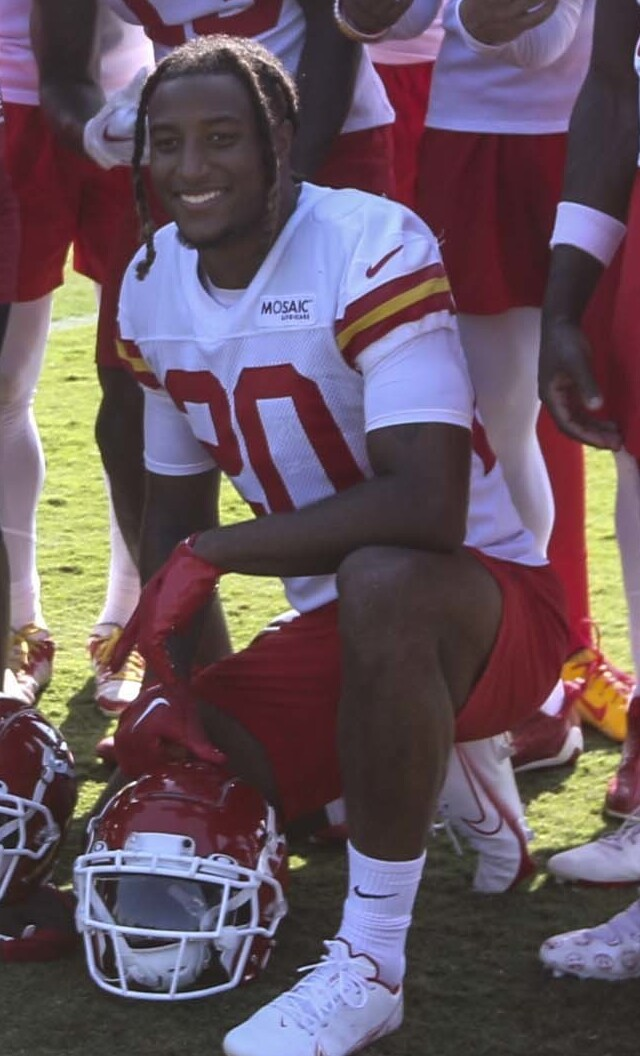
- Reid with the Kansas City Chiefs in 2022

Profile
- Position: Safety

Personal information
- Born: February 15, 1997 (age 29); Prairieville, Louisiana, U.S.
- Listed height: 6 ft 1 in (1.85 m)
- Listed weight: 207 lb (94 kg)

Career information
- High school: Dutchtown (Geismar, Louisiana)
- College: Stanford (2015–2017)
- NFL draft: 2018: 3rd round, 68th overall pick

Career history
- Houston Texans (2018–2021); Kansas City Chiefs (2022–2024); New Orleans Saints (2025–2026)

Awards and highlights
- 2× Super Bowl champion (LVII, LVIII); First-team All-Pac-12 (2017)

Career NFL statistics as of Week 5, 2026
- Total tackles: 681
- Sacks: 6.5
- Forced fumbles: 3
- Fumble recoveries: 3
- Pass deflections: 52
- Interceptions: 11
- Defensive touchdowns: 2
- Stats at Pro Football Reference

Justin Quintin Reid (born February 15, 1997) is an American professional football safety. He played college football for the Stanford Cardinal. He was selected by the Houston Texans in the third round of the 2018 NFL draft. He has also been a member of the Kansas City Chiefs and New Orleans Saints, winning 2 Super Bowls with the former.

== Early life ==
Reid attended Dutchtown High School in Geismar, Louisiana. He committed to Stanford University to play college football.

== College career ==
Reid played at Stanford from 2015 to 2017. After his junior season in 2017, he decided to forgo his senior year and enter the 2018 NFL draft. During his career, he had 170 tackles, six interceptions and one sack.

== Professional career ==
=== Pre-draft ===
On January 9, 2018, Reid announced his decision on Twitter to forgo his remaining eligibility and enter the 2018 NFL draft. Reid attended the NFL Scouting Combine and completed all of the combine and positional drills. He was a top performer at his position in the majority of drills and finished second among safeties in the 40-yard dash, third in the short shuttle and three-cone drill, fifth in the broad jump, eighth in the vertical jump, and 11th in the bench press.

External videos
- Justin Reid's NFL Combine Workout
- Justin Reid's 40-yard dash

On March 22, 2018, Reid participated at Stanford's pro day, but chose to stand on his combine numbers and only performed positional drills. He attended pre-draft visits and private workouts with multiple teams, including the Pittsburgh Steelers, Carolina Panthers, Seattle Seahawks, Detroit Lions, and Philadelphia Eagles. At the conclusion of the pre-draft process, Reid was projected to be a first or second round pick by NFL draft experts and scouts. He was ranked as the top free safety prospect in the draft by DraftScout.com and was ranked as the third best safety in the draft by Scouts Inc. and Sports Illustrated.

Pre-draft measurables
| Height | Weight | Arm length | Hand span | Wingspan | 40-yard dash | 10-yard split | 20-yard split | 20-yard shuttle | Three-cone drill | Vertical jump | Broad jump | Bench press |
|---|---|---|---|---|---|---|---|---|---|---|---|---|
| 6 ft 0 1/2 in (1.84 m) | 207 lb (94 kg) | 31 5/8 in (0.80 m) | 9 3/4 in (0.25 m) | 6 ft 5 1/2 in (1.97 m) | 4.40 s | 1.53 s | 2.55 s | 4.15 s | 6.65 s | 36.5 in (0.93 m) | 10 ft 8 in (3.25 m) | 16 reps |
All values from NFL Combine

=== Houston Texans ===
The Houston Texans selected Reid in the third round (68th overall) of the 2018 NFL draft. Reid was the fifth safety drafted in 2018. Reid unexpectedly fell from the first or second round and was ranked among the top steals of the 2018 NFL Draft.

External videos
- Texans draft Justin Reid 68th overall

==== 2018 ====
On June 10, 2018, the Houston Texans signed Reid to a four–year, $4.06 million contract that includes a signing bonus of $1.03 million. Throughout training camp, Reid competed for the role of starting free safety against Kareem Jackson. Head coach Bill O'Brien named Reid as a backup safety to start the regular season, behind starters Kareem Jackson and Tyrann Mathieu.

On September 9, 2018, Reid made his professional regular season debut in the Texans' season-opener at the New England Patriots and recorded one solo tackle and a pass deflection in a 27–20 loss. The following week, Reid earned his first career start, starting at free safety, and recorded five combined tackles (four solo) during a 17–20 loss at the Tennessee Titans. On October 7, 2018, he made six combined tackles (five solo) and made his first career interception off of pass attempt by Dak Prescott intended for Deionte Thompson in a 19–16 win over the Dallas Cowboys. Prior to Week 6, Reid became the starting free safety for the remainder of the season after Kareem Jackson was moved back to cornerback following an injury to cornerback Aaron Colvin. In Week 8, he had nine combined tackles (five solo), a season-high two pass deflections, and had his second pick of the season on Brock Osweiler in the Texans' 42–23 loss to the Miami Dolphins. The following week, Reid collected a season-high ten combined tackles (nine solo) and recovered a fumble during a 19–17 victory at the Denver Broncos. On November 18, 2018, he recorded four combined tackles (three solo), two pass deflections, and scored his first career touchdown after intercepting a pass by Alex Smith while covering tight end Jordan Reed in the endzone and returned it 101 yards in the Texans' 23–21 win at the Washington Redskins. He finished his rookie season in 2018 with a total of 88 combined tackles (70 solo), ten pass deflections, three interceptions, and one touchdown in 16 games and 12 starts. Pro Football Focus had Reid finish his rookie season with an overall grade of 75.2.

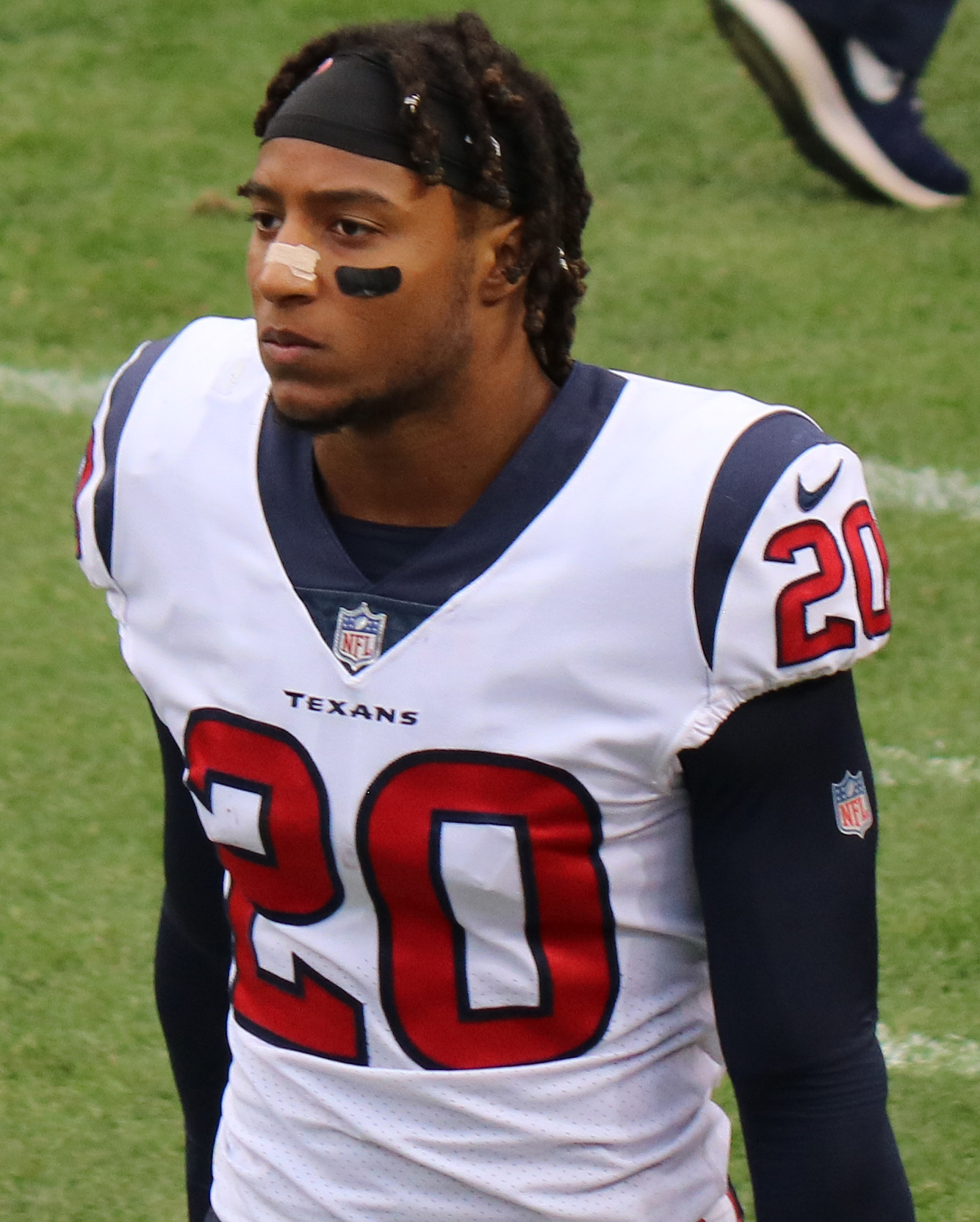
Reid with the Houston Texans in 2018

==== 2019 ====
He successfully underwent surgery on his wrist during the offseason to repair what was described as "mild wear and tear". Entering training camp, Reid was projected to be a starter at safety after they lost both Tyrann Mathieu and Kareem Jackson in free agency. In July, Reid had was involved in a car crash when a suspected drunk driver crashed into his vehicle. Fortunately, he did not suffer any serious injuries and returned to practice a week later. Defensive coordinator Romeo Crennel decided to pair Reid and Tashaun Gipson as the starting safeties to begin the regular season.

In Week 4, he collected a season-high ten combined tackles (nine solo) during a 19–16 loss to the Carolina Panthers. In Week 2 of the 2019 season against the Jacksonville Jaguars, Reid made four tackles and stopped running back Leonard Fournette on a two point conversion attempt as the Texans won 13–12. On November 17, 2019, Reid produced three solo tackles before exiting the game after sustaining a concussion as the Texans were routed by the Baltimore Ravens 41-7. He was sidelined for the Texans' Week 11 victory over the Indianapolis Colts. On December 21, 2019, Reid recorded four solo tackles, a pass deflection, and intercepted a pass thrown by Jameis Winston and recovered a fumble lost by Peyton Barber during the 23–20 win against the Tampa Bay Buccaneers. He finished his sophomore season with a total of 77 combined tackles (56 solo), five pass deflections, two interceptions, and a fumble recovery in 15 games and 15 starts. His overall grade from Pro Football Focus was 76.7 in 2019.

The Houston Texans finished atop the AFC South with an 11–5 record, clinching a playoff berth. On January 4, 2020, Reid started in his first postseason appearance and recorded seven combined tackles (four solo) in a 21–19 overtime victory against the Buffalo Bills in the NFC Wildcard Game. On January 12, 2020, Reid had three solo tackles and a pass deflection as the Texans lost 51–31 at the Kansas City Chiefs in the Divisional Round. On January 22, 2020, it was revealed that Reid was diagnosed with a torn labrum in his shoulder, confessing that he was plagued with the injury since the season began.

==== 2020 ====
He returned as the starting free safety in 2020 and was paired with strong safety Eric Murray. In Week 2, Reid collected a season-high ten combined tackles (eight solo) during a 33–16 loss against the Baltimore Ravens. On October 5, 2020, the Houston Texans fired head coach Bill O'Brien after they began the season with an 0–4 record. Defensive coordinator Romeo Crennel acted as interim head coach for the rest of the season. On November 22, 2020, Reid recorded nine combined tackles (seven solo) and made his first career sack on Cam Newton during a 27–20 victory against the New England Patriots. On December 16, 2020, the Houston Texans placed Reid on injured reserve after suffering a hand injury in Week 14 and subsequently missed the last three games of the season (Weeks 16–18). He finished the 2020 NFL season with a total of 83 combined tackles (62 solo), four pass deflections, and two sacks in 13 games and 13 starts. He finished with an overall grade of 60.7 from Pro Football Focus in 2020.

==== 2021 ====
He entered training camp and was expected to remain as the starting free safety under new defensive coordinator Lovie Smith. Head coach David Culley named Reid and Eric Murray the starting safeties to begin the regular season. On September 19, 2021, Reid recorded four solo tackles, a pass deflection, a forced fumble, and intercepted a pass thrown by Baker Mayfield as the Texans lost 31–21 at the Cleveland Browns. He was inactive for a Week 3 loss to the Carolina Panthers after injuring his knee. In Week 8, he collected a season-high ten combined tackles (five solo) during a 38–22 loss to the Carolina Panthers. Reid suffered a concussion and was sidelined for a Week 15 victory against the Jacksonville Jaguars. He finished with 66 combined tackles (41 solo), four pass deflections, and two interceptions in 13 games and 13 starts. He finished the 2021 NFL season with an overall grade of 50.8 from Pro Football Focus.

=== Kansas City Chiefs ===
==== 2022 ====
On May 14, 2022, the Kansas City Chiefs signed Reid to a three–year, $31.50 million contract that includes $20.48 million guaranteed and a signing bonus of $10.50 million.

The Chiefs signed Reid following the departures of Tyrann Mathieu and Daniel Sorensen. He was projected to earn the role as the starting free safety, replacing Tyrann Mathieu. Head coach Andy Reid selected Reid and Juan Thornhill as the starting safeties to begin the season.

On September 11, 2022, Reid started in the Kansas City Chiefs' season-opener at the Arizona Cardinals and had four combined tackles (two solo) while also filling in as the kicker following an injury to kicker Harrison Butker. He went 1 of 2 on extra points and had a touchback before Butker returned to the game, but Reid would continue to fill in for kickoffs, kicking three more of them into the end zone for touchbacks as the Chiefs won 44–21. In Week 16, he racked up a season-high eight combined tackles (five solo) during a 24–10 victory over the Seattle Seahawks. In his first season as a member of the Kansas City Chiefs, Reid started all 17 regular season games and finished the 2022 NFL season with a total of 83 combined tackles (59 solo), seven pass deflections, and one sack. Pro Football Focus had Reid finish the season with an overall grade of 73.2.

The Kansas City Chiefs finished the 2022 NFL season atop the AFC West with a 14–3 record and earned a first round bye in the playoffs. On January 29, 2023, Reid started in the AFC Championship Game and collected seven solo tackles and a pass deflection as the Chiefs defeated the Cincinnati Bengals 23–20. On February 12, 2023, Reid started in Super Bowl LVIII at free safety alongside strong safety Mike Edwards and recorded seven combined tackles (five solo) in the Chiefs' 38–35 victory against the Philadelphia Eagles. He earned his first Super Bowl ring as a member of the Kansas City Chiefs in 2022.

==== 2023 ====
Reid returned as the starting free safety under defensive coordinator Steve Spagnuolo in 2023, but was paired with strong safety Bryan Cook following the departure of Juan Thornhill. On October 12, 2023, he recorded five combined tackles (four solo), a pass deflection, one sack, and intercepted a pass by Russell Wilson to tight end Greg Dulcich during a 19–8 victory against the Denver Broncos. In Week 13, he collected a season-high ten combined tackles (nine solo) during a 19–27 loss at the Green Bay Packers. He finished the season with a total of 95 combined tackles (74 solo), seven pass deflections, three sacks, and one interception in 16 games and 16 starts. He received an overall grade of 57.7 from Pro Football Focus in 2023.

The Kansas City Chiefs finished the 2023 NFL season first in the AFC West with an 11–6 record. In the AFC Wildcard Game, the Chiefs defeated the Miami Dolphins 26–7. On January 21, 2024, Reid recorded 11 combined tackles (eight solo) as the Chiefs defeated the Buffalo Bills 27–24 in the Divisional Round. In the AFC Championship Game, the Kansas City Chiefs defeated the Baltimore Ravens 17–10 to advance to the Super Bowl. On February 11, 2024, Reid started in Super Bowl LVIII and made five combined tackles (four solo) and was credited with half a sack as the Chiefs defeated the San Francisco 49ers 25–22. Reid recorded nine tackles and 0.5 sacks in the Super Bowl.

==== 2024 ====
He returned as the starting free safety under defensive coordinator Steve Spagnuolo and started alongside free safety Bryan Cook. On September 5, 2024, he started in the Kansas City Chiefs' home-opener against the Baltimore Ravens and collected a season-high nine combined tackles (eight solo) in the Chiefs 27–20 victory. In Week 17, Reid made five solo tackles and intercepted a pass by Russell Wilson to tight end Pat Freiermuth during a 29–10 victory at the Pittsburgh Steelers. He started in 16 games which he appeared in and recorded 87 combined tackles (61 solo), nine pass deflections, and two interceptions. He received an overall grade of 78.2 from Pro Football Focus in 2024, which ranked 10th among all qualifying safeties.

The Kansas City Chiefs finished the 2024 NFL season a top the AFC West with a 15–2 record to clinch a first round bye. On January 18, 2025, Reid made seven combined tackles (five solo) and one pass break up during a 23–14 win against the Houston Texans in the AFC Wildcard Game. The following week, they defeated the Buffalo Bills 32–29 in the AFC Championship Game. On February 9, 2025, Reid started in Super Bowl LIX and made seven combined tackles (five solo) as the Chiefs lost 40–22 against the Philadelphia Eagles.

=== New Orleans Saints ===
On March 12, 2025, Reid signed with the New Orleans Saints on a three–year, $31.5 million contract that includes $22.25 million guaranteed upon signing. In Week 12 against the Atlanta Falcons, Reid intercepted a Kirk Cousins pass that ricocheted off of Kyle Pitts' hands, returning the ball 49 yards for a touchdown. The pick-six was the first Saints interception returned for a touchdown since Tyrann Mathieu did so on October 8, 2023.

On November 19, 2026, Reid was released from the Saints in a mutual agreement.

== NFL career statistics ==
Legend
| | Won the Super Bowl |
| | Led the league |
| **Bold** | Career high |

=== Regular season statistics ===
| Year | Team | Games | | Tackles | | | | | Fumbles | | | | Interceptions | | | | | |
| Year | Team | GP | GS | Cmb | Solo | Ast | Sck | TFL | FF | FR | Yds | TD | Int | Yds | Avg | Lng | TD | PD |
|---|---|---|---|---|---|---|---|---|---|---|---|---|---|---|---|---|---|---|
| 2018 | HOU | 16 | 12 | 88 | 70 | 18 | 0.0 | 2 | **1** | **2** | 0 | 0 | **3** | **128** | 42.6 | **101** | **1** | **10** |
| 2019 | HOU | 15 | 15 | 78 | 57 | 21 | 0.0 | 1 | 0 | 1 | 0 | 0 | 2 | 55 | 27.5 | 37 | 0 | 5 |
| 2020 | HOU | 13 | 13 | 83 | 62 | 21 | 2.0 | **6** | 0 | 0 | 0 | 0 | 0 | 0 | 0.0 | 0 | 0 | 4 |
| 2021 | HOU | 13 | 13 | 66 | 41 | 25 | 0.0 | 2 | **1** | 0 | 0 | 0 | 2 | 45 | 22.5 | 24 | 0 | 4 |
| 2022 | KC | 17 | 17 | 83 | 59 | 24 | 1.0 | 2 | 0 | 0 | 0 | 0 | 0 | 0 | 0.0 | 0 | 0 | 7 |
| 2023 | KC | 16 | 16 | **95** | **74** | 21 | **3.0** | 5 | **1** | 0 | 0 | 0 | 1 | 11 | 11.0 | 11 | 0 | 7 |
| 2024 | KC | 16 | 16 | 87 | 61 | 26 | 0.0 | 5 | 0 | 0 | 0 | 0 | 2 | 8 | 4.0 | 8 | 0 | 9 |
| 2025 | NO | 15 | 15 | 72 | 37 | **35** | 0.5 | 2 | 0 | 0 | 0 | 0 | 1 | 49 | **49.0** | 49 | **1** | 6 |
| 2026 | NO | 5 | 5 | 29 | 20 | 9 | 0.0 | 1 | 0 | 0 | 0 | 0 | 0 | 0 | 0.0 | 0 | 0 | 0 |
| Career | | 126 | 122 | 681 | 481 | 200 | 6.5 | 26 | 3 | 3 | 0 | 0 | 11 | 296 | 26.9 | 101 | 2 | 52 |

=== Postseason statistics ===
| Year | Team | Games | | Tackles | | | | | Fumbles | | | | Interceptions | | | | | |
| Year | Team | GP | GS | Cmb | Solo | Ast | Sck | TFL | FF | FR | Yds | TD | Int | Yds | Avg | Lng | TD | PD |
|---|---|---|---|---|---|---|---|---|---|---|---|---|---|---|---|---|---|---|
| 2018 | HOU | 1 | 1 | 3 | 2 | 1 | 0.0 | 0 | 0 | 0 | 0 | 0 | 0 | 0 | 0.0 | 0 | 0 | **2** |
| 2019 | HOU | 2 | 2 | 10 | 7 | 3 | 0.0 | 1 | 0 | 0 | 0 | 0 | 0 | 0 | 0.0 | 0 | 0 | 1 |
| 2022 | KC | 3 | 3 | 20 | 17 | 3 | 0.0 | 0 | 0 | 0 | 0 | 0 | 0 | 0 | 0.0 | 0 | 0 | 1 |
| 2023 | KC | 4 | 4 | **27** | **18** | **9** | **1.5** | **2** | 0 | 0 | 0 | 0 | 0 | 0 | 0.0 | 0 | 0 | 0 |
| 2024 | KC | 3 | 3 | 19 | 14 | 5 | 0.0 | 1 | 0 | 0 | 0 | 0 | 0 | 0 | 0.0 | 0 | 0 | 1 |
| Career | | 13 | 13 | 79 | 58 | 21 | 1.5 | 4 | 0 | 0 | 0 | 0 | 0 | 0 | 0.0 | 0 | 0 | 5 |

== Personal life ==
Reid's older brother, Eric, also played safety in the NFL. Reid is a two-time champion of the Chess.com BlitzChamps tournaments, defeating Kyler Murray in the grand final match of each event. Reid received chess coaching from James Canty.
