= Canti =

Canti may refer to:

- The plural form of canto, a measure of division used in several types of poetry
- Canti (poetry collection), an 1835 collection of poems by Giacomo Leopardi
- Canti (surname)
- Canti Lau (born 1964), Hong Kong actor
- Canti, fictional robot from the Japanese animated series FLCL

== See also ==
- Cantii or Cantiaci, Iron Age Celtic people living in Britain
- Canty (disambiguation)
