= Kareem Jackson =

American football player (born 1988)

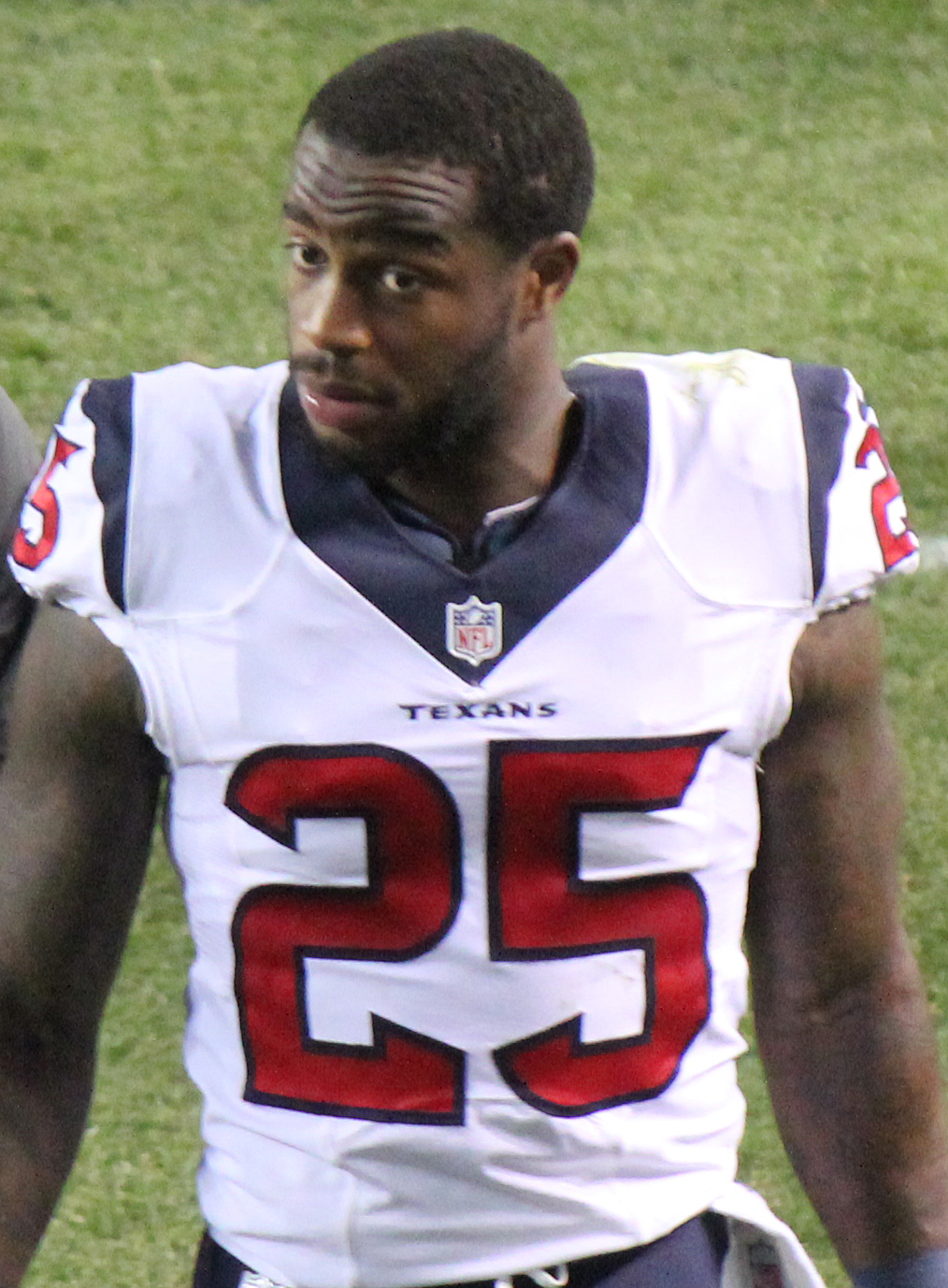
- Jackson with the Houston Texans in 2014

No. 25, 22, 27
- Position: Defensive back

Personal information
- Born: April 10, 1988 (age 38); Macon, Georgia, U.S.
- Listed height: 5 ft 10 in (1.78 m)
- Listed weight: 183 lb (83 kg)

Career information
- High school: Westside (Macon)
- College: Alabama (2007–2009)
- NFL draft: 2010: 1st round, 20th overall pick

Career history

Playing
- Houston Texans (2010–2018); Denver Broncos (2019–2023); Houston Texans (2023); Buffalo Bills (2024)

Operations
- Denver Broncos (2025–2026); Personnel assistant (2025); Area scout (2026)

Awards and highlights
- BCS national champion (2009); Freshman All-American (2007)

Career NFL statistics
- Total tackles: 954
- Forced fumbles: 7
- Fumble recoveries: 7
- Pass deflections: 110
- Interceptions: 22
- Defensive touchdowns: 4
- Stats at Pro Football Reference

Kareem Jackson (born April 10, 1988) is an American former professional football player who was a defensive back in the National Football League (NFL) for 15 seasons. He played college football for the Alabama Crimson Tide. Jackson was selected by the Houston Texans in the first round of the 2010 NFL draft. He also played for the Broncos and Buffalo Bills.

== Early life ==
Jackson attended Westside High School in Macon, Georgia. As a senior, he mainly played running back and compiled 1,436 rushing yards with 20 rushing touchdowns, and nine receptions for 256 yards with two receiving touchdowns.

Following high school, Jackson attended Fork Union Military Academy, where he converted from running back to cornerback.

Considered a four-star recruit by Rivals.com, Jackson was listed as the No. 17 prep school prospect in 2007.

== College career ==
As a true freshman, Jackson played in 13 games with 12 starts for the Alabama Crimson Tide. He ranked second on the team with three interceptions on the season and was fourth for pass breakups with four. Jackson recorded 66 tackles on the season, which was fifth-best on the team. He subsequently received Freshman All-American honors.

Jackson was eighth on the team in tackles with 44 (including 28 solo) as a sophomore in 2008. He registered ten pass breakups on the year with one interception.

As a junior in 2009, Jackson started in all 14 games and had the fifth-most tackles on the team (49). He made one interception and broke up 13 passes during the 2009 season.

On January 15, 2010, Jackson declared he would forgo his senior season and enter the NFL draft.

== Professional career ==
=== Pre-draft ===
Coming out of Alabama, Jackson was invited to the NFL Combine and completed the entire workout and all required drills. He was satisfied with his combine performance and chose to only partake in positional drills at Alabama's Pro Day. After he performed well, he was projected by the majority of analysts and scouts to be drafted in the first or second round. In a deep cornerback draft, he was ranked the fifth-best cornerback and 32nd overall prospect by NFLDraftScout.com. Sports Illustrated also listed him as the fourth-best cornerback in the draft, behind Joe Haden, Kyle Wilson, and Devin McCourty.

External videos
- Kareem Jackson's NFL Combine workout

Pre-draft measurables
Height	Weight	Arm length	Hand span	40-yard dash	10-yard split	20-yard split	20-yard shuttle	Three-cone drill	Vertical jump	Broad jump	Bench press
5 ft 10 1/2 in (1.79 m)	196 lb (89 kg)	30 in (0.76 m)	9 1/8 in (0.23 m)	4.48 s	1.55 s	2.61 s	4.14 s	6.92 s	37.5 in (0.95 m)	9 ft 10 in (3.00 m)	13 reps
All values from NFL Combine

=== Houston Texans (first stint) ===
==== 2010 ====
The Houston Texans selected Jackson in the first round (20th overall) of the 2010 NFL draft. He was only the second cornerback taken in 2010, behind Florida's Joe Haden (seventh overall).

External videos
- Texans select Jackson 20th overall

On July 30, 2010, the Texans signed him to a five-year, $13.52 million contract that includes $7.36 million guaranteed and a signing bonus of $875,500.

Jackson with the Texans in 2010

Jackson entered his rookie training camp as the starting right cornerback opposite veteran Glover Quin. The former made his professional regular season debut in Houston's season-opener against the Indianapolis Colts, recording four solo tackles and a pass deflection in the 34–24 victory. On October 10, he recorded five solo tackles and his first career interception off quarterback Eli Manning, returning it for 23 yards in the 34–10 loss to the New York Giants. The following week, Jackson racked up a season-high seven combined tackles in a 35–32 win over the Kansas City Chiefs. In Week 9 against the San Diego Chargers, he made six combined tackles and intercepted quarterback Philip Rivers in a 29–23 loss. On December 13, he had a season-high six solo tackles in a 34–28 loss to the Baltimore Ravens. Jackson finished his rookie season with a career-high 71 combined tackles, 10 pass deflections, and two interceptions, while starting in all 16 regular season games. The Texans finished 6–10 and were ranked last in the league in passing defense. Football Outsiders ranked Jackson 68th (47%) in success rating and PFF gave him a -10.3 in pass coverage. His average QB rating for opposing quarterbacks was 111.8.

==== 2011 ====
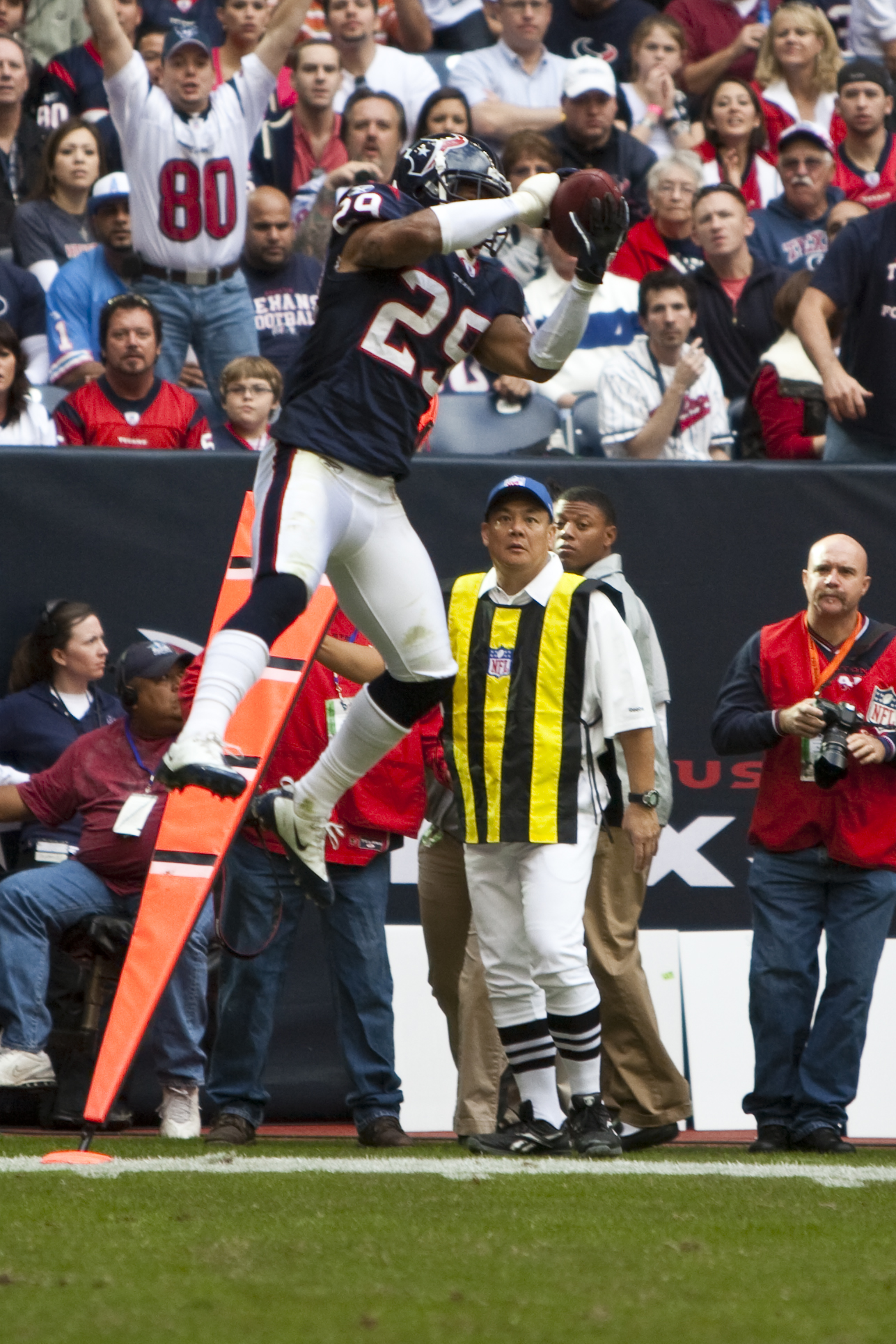
Jackson intercepting a pass

Jackson entered training camp in 2011 competing with Johnathan Joseph, Jason Allen, and Brice McCain to retain the starting cornerback position. New defensive coordinator Wade Phillips named Jackson the left cornerback to start the regular season opposite newly-signed Joseph.

In the Texans' season opener against the Indianapolis Colts, Jackson made one tackle as the Texans routed the Colts 34–7. The following week, he was demoted to backup and Jason Allen was given the start. Allen showed good coverage, played well, and made a game-sealing interception in a 17–10 victory over the Pittsburgh Steelers in Week 4; Jackson was inactive for this game. However, Jackson reclaimed his starting position in Week 6. He finished the game with four solo tackles in a 29–14 loss to the Baltimore Ravens. On November 6, 2011, Jackson recorded a season-high six solo tackles and a pass deflection in a 30–12 victory over the Cleveland Browns. On December 4, he made three solo tackles and two pass deflections, and intercepted quarterback Matt Ryan for his lone interception of the season in a 17–10 win over the Atlanta Falcons. He finished the season with 42 combined tackles (37 solo), a forced fumble, an interception, and six deflected passes in 15 games with 13 starts.

The Houston Texans finished the 2011 season with a 10–6 record and received a playoff berth. On January 7, 2012, Jackson appeared in his first career postseason game and made four combined tackles in a 31–10 victory over the Cincinnati Bengals in the AFC wild card game. The following game, he recorded four solo tackles and deflected a pass in a 20–13 loss to the Baltimore Ravens in the divisional round. Jackson received a coverage rating of -9.5 from PFF and was ranked 67th (45%) in success rate among qualified cornerbacks by Football Outsiders.

==== 2012 ====
Jackson entered the 2012 season slated as the starting cornerback along with Joseph. He started in the Texans' season opener against the Miami Dolphins and finished the 30–10 victory with five combined tackles, two pass deflections, and intercepted quarterback Ryan Tannehill's pass after it was tipped by J. J. Watt. On September 23, 2012, Jackson recorded a season-high seven solo tackles, an assisted tackle, and deflected a pass in a 31–25 win over the Denver Broncos. The following week, he made two solo tackles, deflected two passes, and intercepted Tennessee Titans' quarterback Matt Hasselbeck, returning it 63 yards for his first career touchdown; the Texans routed the Titans 38–14.

In Week 5, he had one tackle and intercepted a pass from quarterback Mark Sanchez in a 23–17 win over the New York Jets. It was Jackson's first time with back-to-back interceptions in two consecutive games. On December 30, he had a season-high eight combined tackles and a pass deflection in a 28–16 loss to the Colts. He finished the 2012 regular season with 53 combined tackles (47 solo), a career-high 16 pass deflections, a career-high four interceptions, and a touchdown, in 16 games with 15 starts. Houston finished first in the AFC South with a 12-4 record, but were eliminated from the playoffs after losing to the New England Patriots in the Divisional round.

Jackson had the best statistical season of his career in 2012. In comparison, Johnathan Joseph was named to the Pro Bowl, although he had only five more combined tackles than Jackson, and had two interceptions to Jackson's four. He was ranked the seventh-best cornerback in coverage rating (+13.4) according to Pro Football Focus. Football Outsiders Almanac 2013 ranked him twelfth in success rate (59%) among all qualified cornerbacks and the QB rating for opposing quarterbacks targeting Jackson was an average of 69.6.

==== 2013 ====
Jackson and Joseph returned in 2013 as the Houston Texans' starting cornerback duo. In Week 2, Jackson recorded a season-high six solo tackles and made two pass deflections in a 30–24 win against the Titans. During the third quarter, Jackson was flagged for unnecessary roughness after hitting Titans' receiver Kendall Wright, who was deemed a defenseless receiver at the time. Three days later, the NFL fined the former $42,000 for the hit, as it was deemed "dirty", and Wright was diagnosed with a concussion. Jackson missed Weeks 11 and 12 after suffering a fractured rib that limited his ability to play.

Jackson finished the season with 56 combined tackles and nine deflected passes in 14 games and starts. PFF gave him a -4.3 pass coverage grade and he allowed a 106.1 QBR. He was ranked 81st (42%) in success rate by Football Outsiders. The Houston Texans finished the season with a 2–14 record; head coach Gary Kubiak was fired in Week 15.

==== 2014 ====
Jackson started the 2014 season-opener against the Washington Redskins and made eight combined tackles in the 17–6 victory. The next week, he made two solo tackles and intercepted rookie quarterback Derek Carr, returning it 65 yards, in a 30–14 victory over the Oakland Raiders. On October 5, 2014, he recorded a season-high nine combined tackles during a 20–17 loss to the Dallas Cowboys.On December 21, Jackson made one solo tackle and intercepted Baltimore Ravens' quarterback Joe Flacco twice as the Texans defeated the Ravens 25–13. He finished the first season under the Texans' new head coach Bill O'Brien with 56 combined (46 solo) tackles, nine pass deflections, and three interceptions in 13 games with as many starts.

==== 2015 ====
Jackson became an unrestricted free agent during the 2015 off-season and was one of the top free agent cornerbacks.

On March 7, 2015, the Texans signed Jackson to a four-year, $34 million contract with $20 million guaranteed and a signing bonus of $9 million.

Entering training camp, he faced competition from first-round rookie Kevin Johnson, but Jackson and Joseph were able to retain their starting roles entering the regular season. On October 18, Jackson made one solo tackle and left in the second quarter for the rest of the game with a left ankle injury; the Texans won 31–20 over the Jacksonville Jaguars. He missed the next four games due to the injury. On November 29, he returned and made four combined tackles, a pass deflection, and intercepted New Orleans Saints' quarterback Drew Brees in a 24–6 victory. In Week 14, Jackson racked up a season-high nine solo tackles and a pass deflection in a 27–6 loss to the New England Patriots. On January 3. 2016, he made three solo tackles, intercepted quarterback Blake Bortles, and returned it for a 27-yard game-sealing touchdown as the Texans routed the Jaguars 30–6. He finished the season with 58 combined tackles (52 solo), six pass deflections, two interceptions, and a touchdown in 12 games with 10 starts.

Houston finished with a 9–7 record and finished first in the AFC South. In the AFC wild card game, Jackson made seven combined tackles and deflected a pass as they lost to the Kansas City Chiefs 30–0.

==== 2016 ====
For the sixth consecutive season, he and Joseph retained their starting roles to begin the 2016 regular season. He missed Weeks 5 and 6 with a hamstring injury. On November 13, 2016, Jackson recorded six solo tackles and intercepted quarterback Bortles, returning it for a 42-yard touchdown in a 24–21 victory over the Jaguars. This was his second consecutive season with a pick-six off of Bortles. During a Week 14 matchup against the Indianapolis Colts, Jackson made a season-high eight combined tackles in a 22–17 victory. He finished the season with 62 combined tackles (51 solo), four pass deflections, an interception, and a touchdown in 14 games with 13 starts.

After the Texans finished first in the AFC South with a 9–7 record (for the second consecutive season), Jackson made four combined tackles in a 27–14 Wild Card Round victory over the Oakland Raiders. They went on to the Divisional Round, where Houston lost 34–16 to the Super Bowl LI-winning New England Patriots; Jackson made another four combined tackles in the game.

==== 2017 ====
Throughout training camp, Jackson faced stiff competition from third-year Kevin Johnson. The former was ultimately surpassed on the depth chart and was named the Texans' slot cornerback to begin the regular season behind starting outside cornerbacks Johnson and Joseph.

During Houston's 7–29 season-opening loss to the Jaguars, Jackson recorded six combined tackles. On September 14, Jackson caused Cincinnati Bengals' rookie wide receiver John Ross to fumble, which teammate Jadeveon Clowney recovered and returned for 49 yards to set up the Texans' offense on a field goal scoring drive. He was thrown into the starting lineup after Joseph left in the second quarter with a shoulder injury, and Johnson left after suffering a MCL sprain. Jackson led the Texans with seven combined tackles and had his first career sack on Bengals' quarterback Andy Dalton. Jackson remained a starter in the absence of Johnson, who was ruled out for four-to-six weeks. He finished the 2017 with one sack, 73 tackles, one interception, and ten passes defended.

==== 2018 ====
In the offseason following organized team activities, HC O'Brien announced that Jackson would be moved to free safety full-time. The move was made after Jackson's struggles at cornerback the previous season, and starting free safety Andre Hal was diagnosed with Hodgkin's lymphoma.

Despite this statement, Jackson started in all 16 games at right cornerback alongside Joseph at left cornerback in 2018; third-round rookie Justin Reid was free safety for the season, and Johnson only played in one game that season after suffering a concussion in the season opener. He finished the 2018 season with one sack, 87 total tackles, two interceptions, 17 passes defended, two forced fumbles, and one fumble recovery.

=== Denver Broncos ===
==== 2019 ====
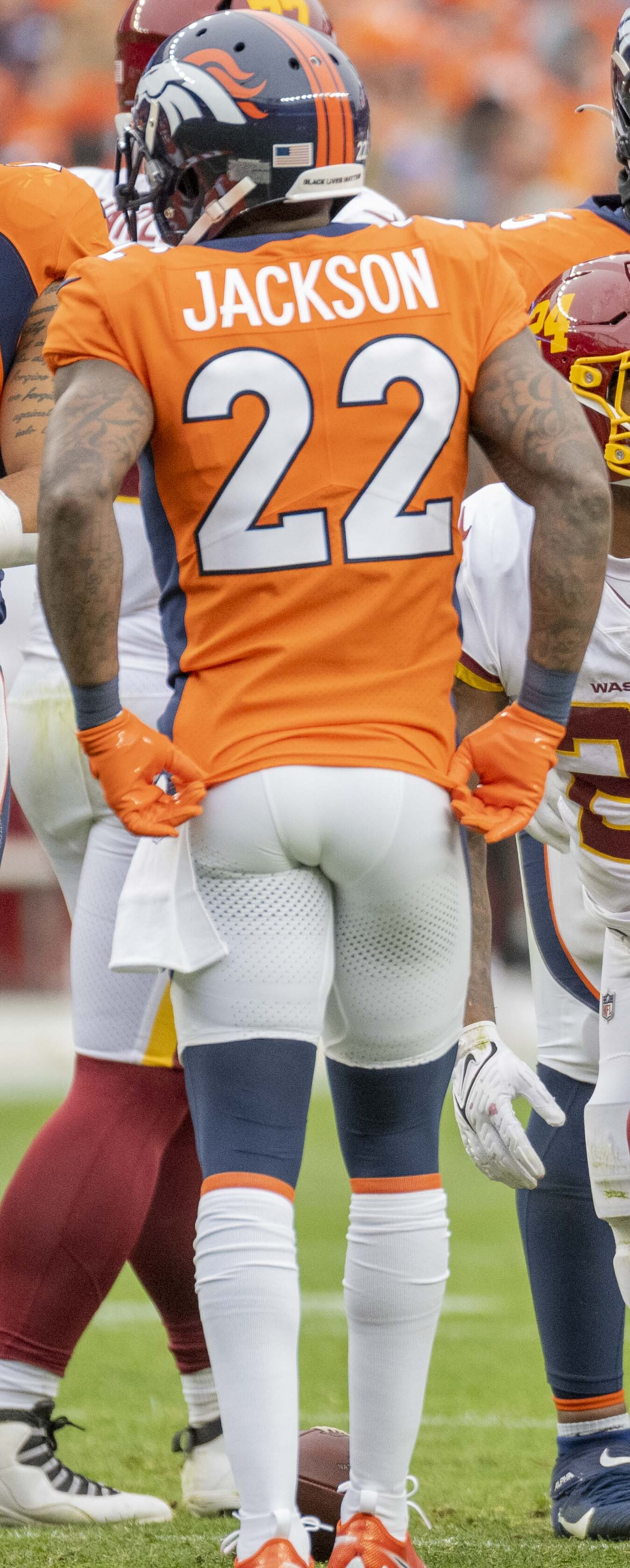
Jackson with the Broncos in 2021

On March 13, 2019, Jackson signed a three-year $33 million deal with the Denver Broncos. New head coach Vic Fangio saw Jackson's unutilized potential as strong safety and converted him to the role. In Week 6 against the Tennessee Titans, Jackson recorded an interception off quarterback Ryan Tannehill in the 16–0 win. This was his first interception of the season and as a member of the Broncos. In Week 14 against his former team, the Texans, Jackson recorded 11 tackles, intercepted a pass thrown by quarterback Deshaun Watson, and received a lateral from teammate Jeremiah Attaochu via a fumble made by wide receiver Keke Coutee; Jackson returned the ball for a 70-yard touchdown during the 38–24 win, earning him AFC Defensive Player of the Week. On December 17, Jackson was suspended for the final two games of the 2019 season, stemming from a September arrest for DUI. He was reinstated on December 30. He finished the 2019 season with 71 tackles, two interceptions, ten passes defended, one forced fumble, and one fumble recovery for a touchdown.

==== 2020 ====
In Week 17 against the Las Vegas Raiders, Jackson recovered a fumble lost by tight end Darren Waller and later intercepted a pass thrown by quarterback Derek Carr in a narrow 32–31 loss. He finished the 2020 season with 89 tackles, one interception, four passes defended, and two fumble recoveries.

==== 2021 ====
On March 17, 2021, the Broncos declined the option on Jackson's contract, making him an unrestricted free agent. On March 24, Jackson signed a one-year, $5 million contract with the Broncos.

In Week 2 against the Jaguars, he recorded an interception and a pass deflection off quarterback Trevor Lawrence in a 23–13 win; teammate and first-round rookie Patrick Surtain II was able to make the same two plays. In Week 6, Jackson recorded 1.0 sack (his only of the season) on quarterback Derek Carr in a 24–34 loss to the Raiders. He finished the 2021 season with one sack, 88 tackles, one interception, and two passes defended.

==== 2022 ====
On April 11, 2022, Jackson signed a one-year deal with the Broncos. He finished the season with three pass deflections and two fumble recoveries in 17 games with as many starts.

==== 2023 ====
On May 15, 2023, Jackson re-signed with the Broncos on another one-year contract. Jackson received a $14,819 fine for an illegal hit on Las Vegas Raiders' wide receiver Jakobi Meyers in their Week 1 game. In a Week 2 loss to the Washington Commanders, he was ejected after an illegal helmet-to-helmet hit against tight end Logan Thomas, resulting in the latter getting a concussion. His hit on Thomas resulted in a $19,669 fine. Jackson received a third fine ($11,473) in as many games for unnecessary roughness in a Week 3 loss to the Miami Dolphins. The league issued him a fine for $43,709, Jackson's fourth for the season, for unnecessary roughness stemming from a late hit on the Thursday Night Football loss to the Kansas City Chiefs. Following his second ejection that season in a Week 7 win for a hit on Green Bay Packers' tight end Luke Musgrave ("defenseless receiver"), the NFL suspended Jackson for four games. They reduced the suspension to two games after Jackson appealed. In his first game back from suspension, Jackson made an illegal hit on Minnesota Vikings' quarterback Joshua Dobbs. Despite not being penalized in the game, the NFL clarified that Jackson's hit was illegal due to him lowering the crown of his helmet before the hit and issued him another four-game suspension the next day. The league denied Jackson's appeal for his second suspension, upholding their original four-game sentence.

The Broncos released Jackson on December 25.

=== Houston Texans (second stint) ===
On December 26, 2023, Jackson was claimed off waivers by the Houston Texans. This move reunited him with head coach DeMeco Ryans, who was his teammate on the Texans during the 2010 and 2011 seasons. He finished the 2023 season with 53 total tackles, two interceptions, and three passes defended.

=== Buffalo Bills ===
On July 30, 2024, Jackson signed with the Buffalo Bills. He was released as part of final roster cuts on August 27. Jackson was signed to the practice squad on August 28. Jackson was elevated from the practice squad on December 14 ahead of the Bills' 48-42 victory over the Detroit Lions, and recorded a combined 3 tackles from 32 snaps.

=== Retirement ===
On October 14, 2026, Jackson signed a ceremonial, one-day contract with the Denver Broncos to retire as a member of the team.

== NFL career statistics ==
Year	Team	GP	Tackles				Interceptions						Fumbles		
Year	Team	GP	Cmb	Solo	Ast	Sck	Int	Yds	Avg	Lng	TD	PD	FF	FR	Yds
2010	HOU	16	71	58	13	0.0	2	23	11.5	23	0	10	1	0	0
2011	HOU	15	42	37	5	0.0	1	0	0.0	0	0	6	1	0	0
2012	HOU	16	53	47	6	0.0	4	71	17.8	63	1	16	0	0	0
2013	HOU	14	56	51	5	0.0	0	0	0.0	0	0	9	0	1	0
2014	HOU	13	57	48	9	0.0	3	97	32.3	65	0	9	0	0	0
2015	HOU	12	58	52	6	0.0	2	77	37.5	50	1	6	1	1	34
2016	HOU	14	62	51	11	0.0	1	42	42.0	42T	1	4	0	0	0
2017	HOU	16	73	54	19	1.0	1	2	2.0	2	0	10	1	0	0
2018	HOU	16	87	70	17	1.0	2	24	12.0	13	0	17	2	1	0
2019	DEN	13	71	48	23	0.0	2	28	14.0	24	1	10	1	0	0
2020	DEN	16	89	67	22	0.0	1	13	13.0	13	0	4	0	2	2
2021	DEN	15	88	62	26	1.0	1	7	7.0	7	0	2	0	0	0
2022	DEN	17	94	55	39	0.0	0	0	0.0	0	0	3	0	2	2
2023	DEN	8	51	36	15	0.0	2	5	2.5	5	0	3	0	0	0
2023	HOU	2	2	1	1	0.0	0	0	0.0	0	0	0	0	0	0
2024	BUF	1	3	1	2	0.0	0	0	0.0	0	0	0	0	0	0
Career		203	954	737	217	3.0	22	389	17.7	65	4	110	7	7	38

== Executive career ==
=== Denver Broncos ===
On May 11, 2025, it was announced that Jackson would attend the Denver Broncos' rookie minicamp to work as a personnel helper for GM George Paton.

On February 24, 2026, it was reported that Jackson was working as a southwest area scout for the Broncos during the NFL Combine. After the 2026 offseason, he moved on from his role.
