= Alvin Copeland =

American high school basketball and track coach

Biographical details
- Education: Fort Valley State University

Coaching career (HC unless noted)
- 1973–2011: Northeast High School (Macon, Georgia)

Head coaching record
- Overall: 881 wins (girls' basketball)

Accomplishments and honors

Championships
- 5 Georgia girls' basketball state championships 8 Georgia track and field state championships

Alvin Copeland is an American former high school basketball, track and field, and cross-country coach best known for his more than four decades at Northeast High School in Macon, Georgia. Copeland won 881 games as the school's girls' basketball coach and led Northeast teams to multiple state championships in basketball and track and field.

Copeland was inducted into the Georgia Sports Hall of Fame as a member of its 2026 class. He had previously been inducted into several athletic halls of fame, including the Macon Sports Hall of Fame and the Georgia Athletic Coaches Association Hall of Fame.

== Early life and education ==
Copeland was raised in Valdosta, Georgia. He attended Fort Valley State University, where he played football.

== Coaching career ==
Copeland joined the faculty of Northeast High School in Macon and began his coaching career there in 1973. He coached girls' basketball as well as boys' and girls' track and field and cross country.

=== Girls' basketball ===
Copeland led the Northeast girls' basketball program to its first state championship in 1975. The team subsequently won state championships in 1981, 1982, 1985 and 2002.

By the time he retired in 2011, Copeland had accumulated 881 victories as a girls' basketball coach. His career win total ranked among the highest in the history of girls' high school basketball in Georgia and nationally.

The 2002 championship was Northeast's most recent state championship in any sport as of 2025, according to The Macon Melody.

=== Track and field ===
Copeland also led Northeast to significant success in track and field. His boys' teams won state championships in 1975 and 1977, while the girls' program won six state championships, beginning in 1979.

In 2002, Northeast won both the girls' basketball state championship and a girls' track and field state championship under Copeland during the same academic year.

Among the athletes Copeland coached was Brenda Cliette Thomas, who became an Olympic reserve athlete and later served as fire chief in Macon.

Copeland was inducted into the Georgia Sports Hall of Fame as a member of its 2026 class. He had previously been inducted into several athletic halls of fame, including the Macon Sports Hall of Fame and the Georgia Athletic Coaches Association Hall of Fame.

Copeland also led Northeast to significant success in track and field. His boys' teams won state championships in 1975 and 1977, while the girls' program won six state championships, beginning in 1979.

In 2002, Northeast won both the girls' basketball state championship and a girls' track and field state championship under Copeland during the same academic year.

Among the athletes Copeland coached was Brenda Cliette Thomas, who became an Olympic reserve athlete and later served as fire chief in Macon.

== Athletic administration ==
In addition to coaching, Copeland served as athletic director at Northeast High School. He was named Georgia's state Athletic Director of the Year in 2007.

The basketball court or gymnasium at Northeast High School was later named in Copeland's honor.

== Honors ==
Copeland has received numerous honors for his coaching career. He was inducted into the Southern Intercollegiate Athletic Conference Hall of Fame in 1997, the Macon Sports Hall of Fame in 2004 and the Georgia Athletic Coaches Association Hall of Fame in 2012.

In 2024, Copeland was among the inaugural group of retired coaches inducted into the Georgia Basketball Coaches Association Hall of Fame.

In 2026, he was inducted into the Georgia Sports Hall of Fame. The Hall cited his five girls' basketball state championships, eight track and field state championships and 881 basketball victories as major accomplishments of his career.

The Georgia Sports Hall of Fame and local media also recognized Copeland at FanFest, where his career and contributions to Bibb County athletics were highlighted.

== Legacy ==
Copeland spent more than four decades associated with Northeast High School and became one of the most successful high school coaches in Middle Georgia. His 881 basketball victories place him among the winningest girls' basketball coaches in Georgia history.

An annual track and field meet in Macon has also been held under the name Alvin Copeland Invitational.

== See also ==
- Georgia Sports Hall of Fame
- Fort Valley State University
- Macon, Georgia
