= Hugh Robertson (basketball) =

American basketball player (born 1989)

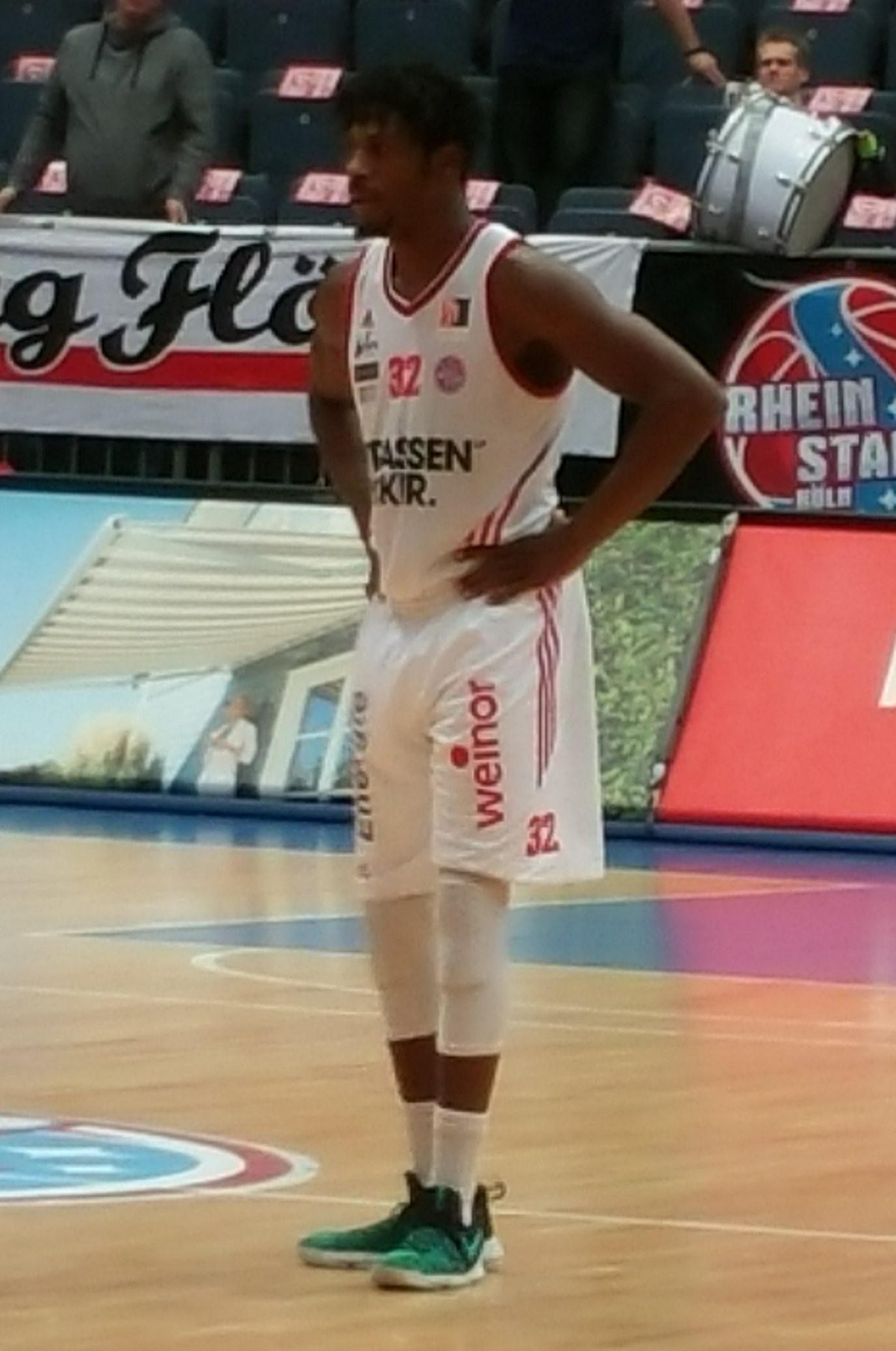
- Robertson with RheinStars Köln in 2017

Personal information
- Born: September 15, 1989 (age 37) Macon, Georgia
- Listed height: 6 ft 6 in (1.98 m)
- Listed weight: 205 lb (93 kg)

Career information
- High school: Northeast (Macon, Georgia)
- College: Tallahassee CC (2008–2010); South Florida (2010–2012)
- NBA draft: 2012: undrafted
- Playing career: 2012–2020
- Position: Shooting guard
- Number: 10

Career history
- 2012–2014: Hopsi Polzela
- 2014: Tadamon Zouk
- 2014–2015: Cognac BB
- 2015–2016: Helios Suns Domžale
- 2016–2017: RheinStars Köln
- 2017: Rethymno Cretan Kings
- 2018: Niners Chemnitz
- 2018: RheinStars Köln
- 2018–2020: Leuven Bears

Career highlights
- Belgian League MVP (2020); Belgian League scoring champion (2020); Slovenian League champion (2016); Slovenian Supercup winner (2016); Alpe Adria Cup winner (2016)

Hugh Gibson Robertson (born September 15, 1989) is an American retired basketball player. Standing at 6 ft 6 in (1.98 m), he played the shooting guard position. After playing two years of college basketball at Tallahassee Community College, and two years at South Florida, Robertson entered the 2012 NBA draft, but he was not selected in the draft's two rounds.

== High school career ==
Robertson played high school basketball at Northeast High School in Macon, Georgia. He was selected to the second team Preseason All-Middle Georgia and averaged 18.3 points and 9.2 rebounds per game.

== College career ==
As a senior at Tallahassee Community College, Robertson was ranked as the nation's No. 2 junior college prospect at the shooting guard/small forward position. He played 31 games, producing 11.6 points, 4.7 rebounds and 2.1 assists per game. He also led the Eagles to the 2010 FCCAA Championship game and a 25-6 overall record being selected to the 2010 FCCAA All-Tournament Team.

After two years at Tallahassee, Robertson was transferred to South Florida. During his Junior year, he appeared in 33 games, averaging 8.3 points, 4.3 rebounds and 1.8 assists per game. At his final year at college, his numbers dropped, averaging 6.5 points and 4.3 rebounds in 36 games.

== Professional career ==
After going undrafted in the 2012 NBA draft, Wright joined Hopsi Polzela of the Slovenian League. He stayed at the team for two years before joining Tadamon Zouk of the Lebanese League. The next season, he returned to the Slovenian League and joined Helios Suns Domžale. With Domžale, Robertson won the Slovenian League, the Slovenian Supercup and the Alpe Adria Cup.

On June 19, 2016, he joined RheinStars Köln of the 2. Basketball Bundesliga. The next year, he left Germany and joined Rethymno Cretan Kings of the Greek Basket League. He officially left the Greek team on December 19, 2017.

In the 2019–20 season, Robertson played for Leuven Bears in the Belgian Pro Basketball League. He was named the league's Most Valuable Player, becoming the first Leuven player to win the award. He averaged 19.7 points, 6.8 rebounds and 3 assists, until the league was cancelled due to the COVID-19 pandemic.

In September 2020, Robertson retired.
