= St. Stephens, Alabama =

St. Stephens
- CDP
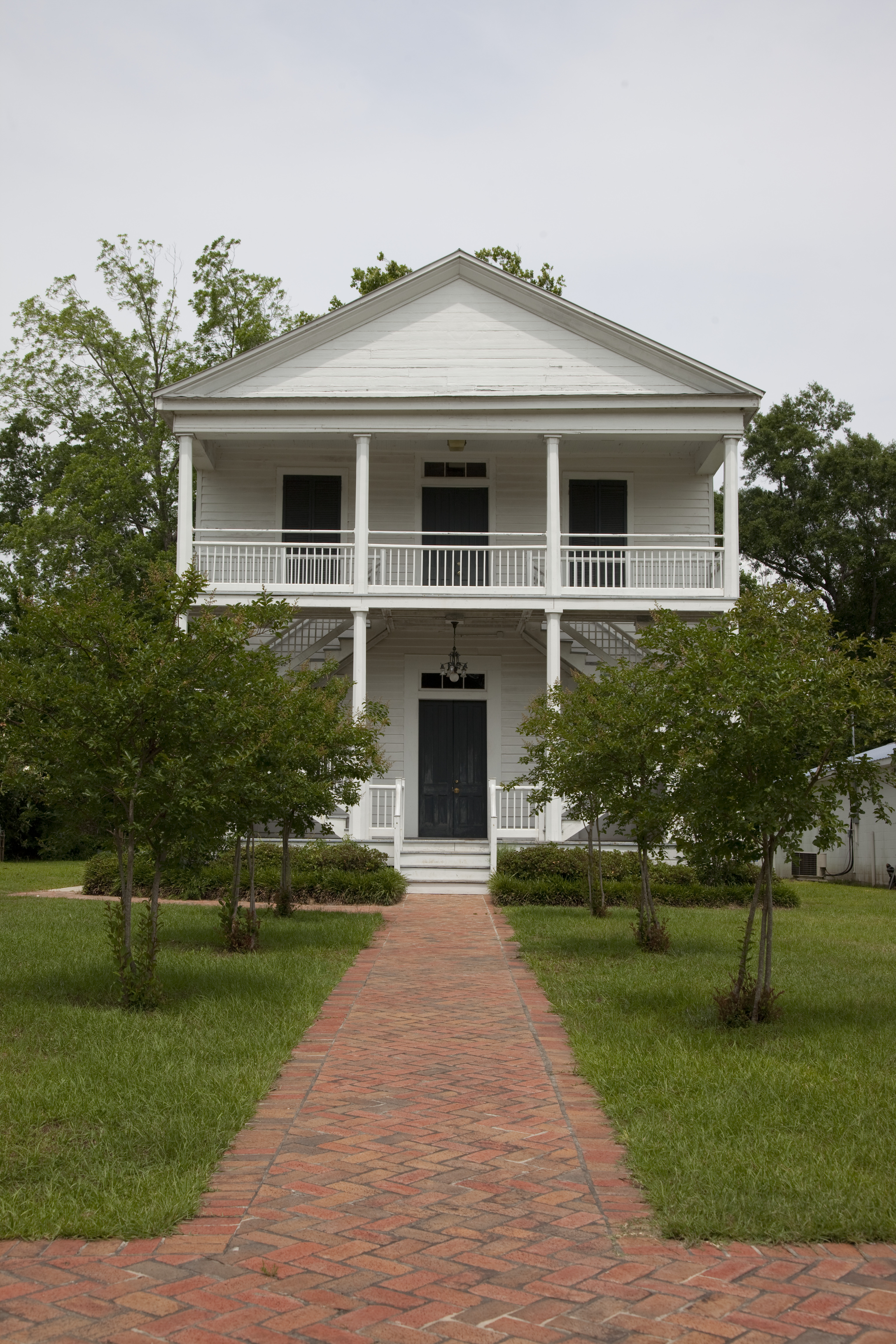
- St. Stephens Courthouse in "New" St. Stephens, completed in 1854.

- Location of St. Stephens in Washington County, Alabama.
- Coordinates: 31°32′51″N 88°03′20″W
- Country: United States
- State: Alabama
- County: Washington

Area
  - Total: 10.01 sq mi (25.93 km^{2})
  - Land: 9.88 sq mi (25.58 km^{2})
  - Water: 0.14 sq mi (0.35 km^{2})
- Elevation: 233 ft (71 m)

Population (2020)
  - Total: 415
  - Density: 42.0/sq mi (16.22/km^{2})
- Time zone: UTC-6 (Central (CST))
  - Summer (DST): UTC-5 (CDT)
- ZIP code: 36569
- Area code: 251
- FIPS code: 01-67584
- GNIS feature ID: 2628605

St. Stephens or Saint Stephens is an unincorporated census-designated place in Washington County, Alabama, United States. As of the 2020 census, St. Stephens had a population of 415. Located near the Tombigbee River in the southwestern part of the state and 67 miles north of Mobile, it is composed of two distinct sites: Old St. Stephens and New St. Stephens. The Old St. Stephens site lies directly on the river and is no longer inhabited. It was the territorial capital of the Alabama Territory. Now encompassed by the Old St. Stephens Historical Park, it is listed on the National Register of Historic Places.

Changes in the territorial capital and transportation resulted in the Old St. Stephens site being bypassed by development. "New" St. Stephens developed two miles inland around a railway station, but adjacent to the old site. It is the location of the post office, Baptist and Methodist churches, and residences. It has one building listed on the National Register and another on the Alabama Register of Landmarks and Heritage.

== Demographics ==
Historical population
Census	Pop.	Note	%±
1890	387		—
2010	495		—
2020	415		−16.2%
U.S. Decennial Census

St. Stephens first appeared on the 1890 U.S. Census as an unincorporated village. It did not reappear again until 2010 when it was classified as a census designated place in the 2010 U.S. census.

St. Stephens CDP, Alabama – Racial and ethnic composition Note: the US Census treats Hispanic/Latino as an ethnic category. This table excludes Latinos from the racial categories and assigns them to a separate category. Hispanics/Latinos may be of any race.
Race / Ethnicity (NH = Non-Hispanic)	Pop 2010	Pop 2020	% 2010	% 2020
White alone (NH)	310	279	62.63%	67.23%
Black or African American alone (NH)	178	126	35.96%	30.36%
Native American or Alaska Native alone (NH)	0	3	0.00%	0.72%
Asian alone (NH)	2	1	0.40%	0.24%
Native Hawaiian or Pacific Islander alone (NH)	0	0	0.00%	0.00%
Other race alone (NH)	0	0	0.00%	0.00%
Mixed race or Multiracial (NH)	2	5	0.40%	1.20%
Hispanic or Latino (any race)	3	1	0.61%	0.24%
Total	495	415	100.00%	100.00%

== History ==
Old St. Stephens was situated on a limestone bluff that the Native Americans called Hobucakintopa. It was located at a point on the Tombigbee River where rocky shoals ended navigation for boats traveling north from Mobile, 67 miles to the south. As early as 1772, British surveyor Bernard Romans noted that "sloops and schooners may come up to this rapid; therefore, I judge some considerable settlement will take place."

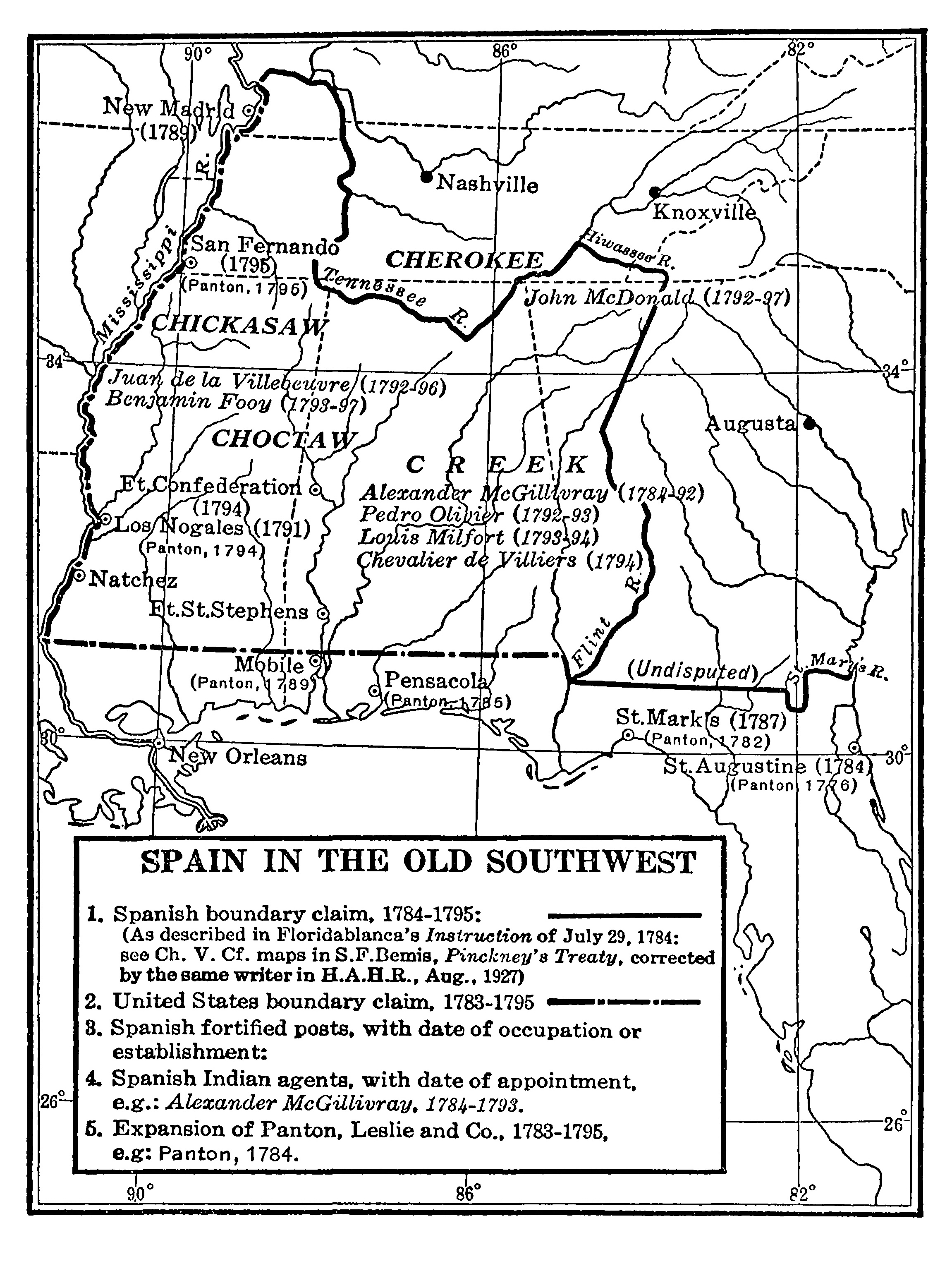
Map of Spain in the Old Southwest, including site of Ft. St. Stephens

By 1789, when the territory was again under Spanish control, the governor of Mobile, Juan Vincente Folch, established a fort and outpost here. By 1796 over 190 white residents, mostly settlers from the United States, and their 97 or so enslaved African-American workers, were living around the fort. Under the Treaty of San Lorenzo following the American Revolutionary War, Spain transferred the fort to the United States on February 5, 1799. This region was included in the Mississippi Territory.

The Choctaw Federal Trading House was established in 1803 at St. Stephens, named for the dominant Native American tribe in the area. Americans traded manufactured goods such as tools and cloth for deerskins. George Strother Gaines was appointed by the federal government to head the Choctaw Agency in 1805 as the federal representative to the people. He continued to use the old Spanish blockhouse as the agency's store and established a land office (which was moved from nearby Fort Stoddert) in the former warehouse. He used the home of the former Spanish commandant as his own residence. In 1811 Gaines constructed what may have been the first brick building built by Americans in (today's) Alabama; it served as a warehouse.

In 1804 Ephraim Kirby was appointed superior court judge of the Mississippi Territory by President Thomas Jefferson. In a letter to the president, Kirby described the residents of St. Stephens as "illiterate, wild and savage, of depraved morals, unworthy of public confidence or private esteems, litigious, disunited, and knowing each other, universally distrustful of each other." Pioneer minister Lorenzo Dow saw these weak points as a challenge, especially when he was asked to leave town. Dow, in a dramatic manner, prophesied the town's demise within a century, that it would become a "roosting place for bats and owls" and a ruin in which "no stone would lie upon another."

Settlers living around Fort St. Stephens requested official recognition from the Mississippi Territorial legislature, which chartered the town of St. Stephens on January 8, 1807. The charter was amended on December 18, 1811, and the settlement was officially renamed Saint Stephens. By 1815, the Mississippi Territorial legislature surveyed the town site and lots were sold. Approximately 40 houses were reported in the town in 1816.

Following Mississippi's statehood in 1817, the Alabama Territory was established. St. Stephens served as its territorial capital from 1817 to 1819, stimulating rapid town growth. By 1819 St. Stephens boasted over 500 homes. Its approximately 20 stores and commercial establishments included two hotels, legal and medical offices, and a theatre.

- Old St. Stephens Site
- U.S. National Register of Historic Places
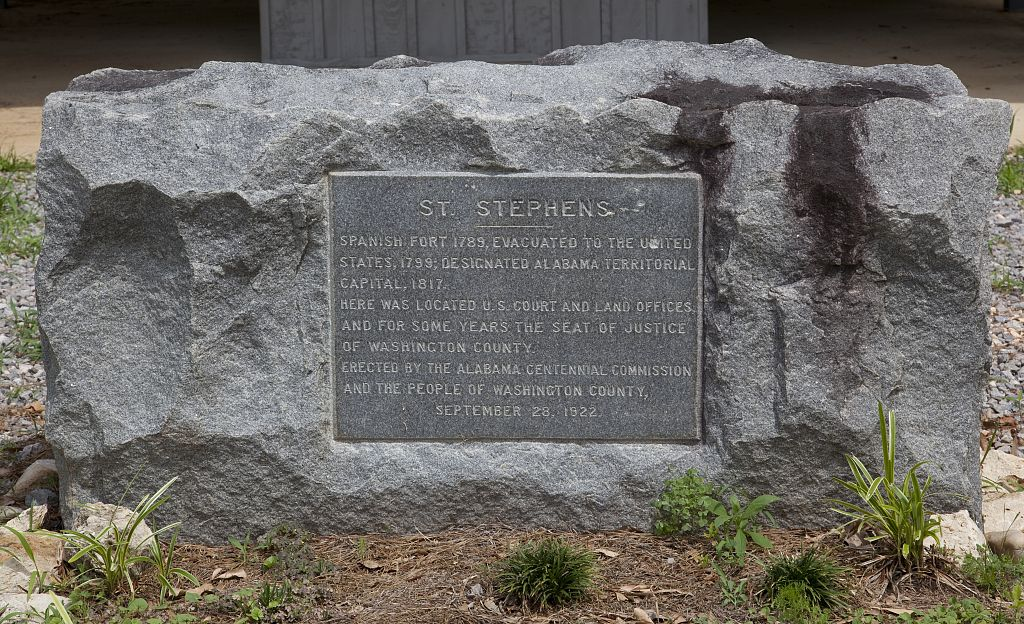
- Marker placed by the Alabama Centennial Commission in 1922
- Nearest city: St. Stephens, Alabama
- Area: 74 acres (30 ha)
- NRHP reference No.: 70000111
- Added to NRHP: December 29, 1970

Among the prominent citizens of St. Stephens was Henry Hitchcock, first attorney general of Alabama and later chief justice of the state Supreme Court. A post office was established in 1818, and George Fisher carried mail between St. Stephens and Mobile. Thomas Eastin published the Halcyon and Tombeckbe Advertiser, the fourth newspaper established in the Alabama Territory. Eastin described St. Stephens as a town of elegant tree-shaded homes, spacious streets, and genteel citizens. Washington Academy, a private boys school founded in 1811, was located on a prominent hill in town. The Tombecbe Bank, the first to be chartered in the state, was established by Israel Pickens, who would later be elected as the third governor of Alabama.

When the first state assembly adjourned at St. Stephens on February 14, 1818, many Alabama residents thought the capital should be moved to a more central location. Tuscaloosa was under consideration when Governor William Wyatt Bibb made the announcement in 1819 that the capital would be moved to Cahaba. This change threatened the future of St. Stephens. In addition, the development of shallow draft boats permitted travelers to pass over the shoals and venture further upriver past the town. Lastly, yellow fever outbreaks caused high mortality in the town.

Railway construction bypassed the town, and a station was established about two miles west of the river. Within two decades, most of the remaining residents had moved around the station to settle New St. Stephens. By 1833 the old town site was reduced in population to a small village; by the time of the American Civil War, it had largely been superseded by the new town.

The old site was listed on the National Register of Historic Places on December 29, 1970. The St. Stephens Historical Commission, which oversees the Old St. Stephens Historical Park, was incorporated in 1988, with a mission to promote and sponsor historical research and archaeological studies of Old St. Stephens. In 1999, the Alabama Historical Commission gave it a grant for archaeological studies. The goal was to complete a map of the old town site, denoting the location of streets, building foundations, cellar depressions, and cisterns, and to excavate some of the old building sites.

"New" St. Stephens has one building listed on the National Register of Historic Places, the St. Stephens Courthouse. Listed on July 3, 1997, it has been restored by the St. Stephens Historical Commission to serve as a visitor center and local history museum near the entrance road to the Old St. Stephens Historical Park. Additionally, the St. Stephens Methodist Church building, completed in 1857, was listed on the Alabama Register of Landmarks and Heritage on March 25, 1976.

== Notable people ==
- Hattie Canty, labor activist
- Israel Victor Welch, member of the Provisional Congress of the Confederate States from 1862 to 1865

== See also ==
- List of current and former capital cities within U.S. states
