= Alexander II Magnet School (Macon, Georgia) =

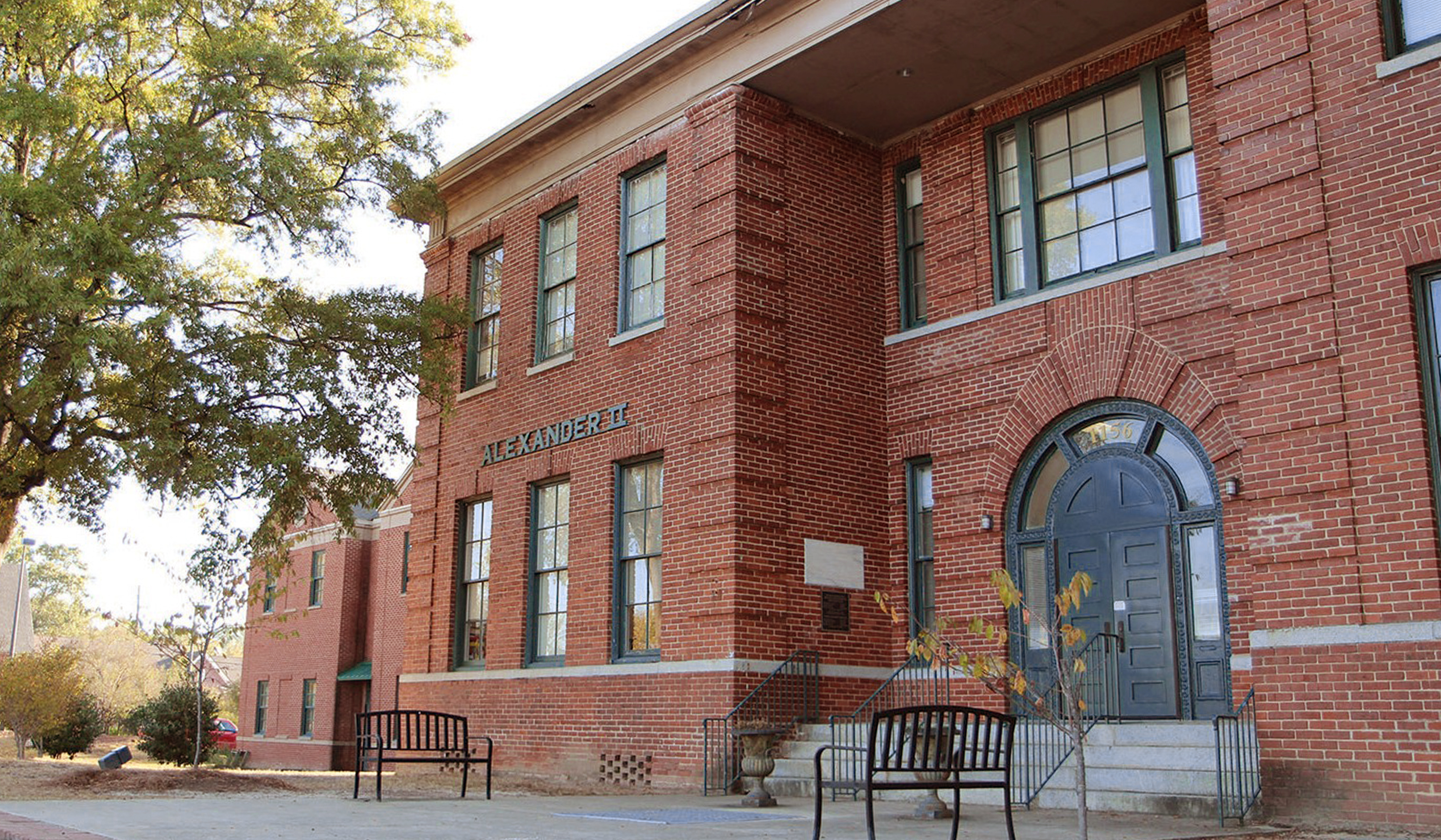

Location
- 1156 College Street; Macon, Bibb, Georgia 31216; United States
- 32°49′58″N 83°38′42″W

Information
- Other names: Alexander II, Alex II
- School type: State elementary magnet school
- Motto: Our challenge is for every student to exceed expectations.
- Opened: 1902; 124 years ago
- Founder: Elam Alexander
- School district: Bibb County Public School District
- NCES District ID: 1300420
- NCES School ID: 130042000198
- Principal: Donna Cline
- Grades: K-5
- Website: alexii.bcsdk12.net

Alexander II Magnet School is a historic public elementary school located in Macon, Georgia of the United States. It was established at the beginning of the 20th century and provides primary education for grades K-5 as part of the Bibb County School District. The school's mission statement is "Utilizing a curriculum that is rich in math, science, and technology, we seek to motivate all students to become confident, self-directed lifelong learners."

== History ==
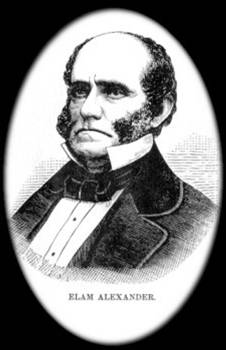

=== Founder ===
Elam Alexander (1796–1863) was an architect, entrepreneur, and founding father of the city of Macon. He became a successful businessman after permanently moving from his birthplace, Iredell County, North Carolina, to Macon in 1826. For over the next 30 years, Alexander was responsible for the development of several of Macon's most iconic and historical buildings and institutions during the city's early expansion period. As a strong advocate for public education within the community, Alexander funded and helped build a number of public educational institutions across Macon—later referred to as Alexander Free Schools. Alexander left instructions in his will to form the Alexander Free School Board trust, later named the Elam Alexander Trust, to continue his lifelong work of promoting education throughout Bibb County.

=== Early history ===
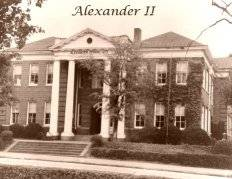

The establishment of Alexander II primary school commenced under the directive of the Alexander Free School Board at its present-day location, College Street, Macon, Georgia in 1901. After a year of construction, the school was opened to the public in the year of 1902.

Throughout the next century, the school would continue to expand and develop as a public institution with the help and funding of the Bibb County's Board of Education and the Elam Alexander Trust—Alexander Free School Board. These projects included the construction and investiture of classrooms, a school library, an auditorium, and an administrative center.

=== Alexander II Magnet School ===
Three years after the United States Congress recognized the curricular classification system of magnet schools in 1976, the Alexander II officially became the very first specialized magnet school in the state of Georgia. The school re-titled itself as Alexander II Magnet School in 1979.

The school was recognized as a protected and historic site by the state of Georgia when it was listed by the National Trust for Historic Preservation as one of the “Most Endangered Historic places” in June 2000. Since the beginning of the 21st century, Alexander II has been honorably recognized twice by the US Department of Education as a National Blue Ribbon School of Excellence in the years 2006 and 2015.

== Present day ==
Alexander II has over 500 students with a 15:9 student-to-teacher ratio. The school has been placed among the top 20% of public schools in the state of Georgia for overall performance and student academic growth since 2015. The school's mascot is Albert Einstein and its motto is "Our challenge is for every student to exceed expectations." Donna Cline is the school's current principal.

As of 2015, the demographics of the student body were 60% black/African American, 31% white, 3% Hispanic, 1% Asian, and 3% multiracial.
