= Academy for Classical Education =

Charter school in Macon, Georgia, U.S.

Coordinates: 32.9392°N 83.7279°W

Location
- 5665 New Forsyth Rd, Macon, GA 31210; Macon, Bibb, Georgia

Information
- School type: Charter
- Motto: "Scientia Est Potentia" ("Knowledge is power")
- Established: 2014; 12 years ago
- Founders: Laura Perkins, Esterine Stokes
- Head of school: Robby Jones
- Student to teacher ratio: 17/1
- Colors: Green, Royal Blue, Gold
- Athletics conference: Georgia High School Association
- Mascot: Gryphons
- Teams: 21 Teams

Academy for Classical Education is a charter school in Macon, Georgia, that was originally part of the Bibb County School District. The school serves students in kindergarten to 12th grade. The student body is about 70 percent white, 16 percent African American and 8 percent Asian while Macon itself is about 70 percent African American and 25 percent white. It is highly ranked and in 2020 it was designated a National Blue Ribbon School by the United States Department of Education.

The school was established in 2014 and in 2019, it separated from local school district oversight to become a State Commissioned Charter School. While this led to improvements in budget and curriculum, it also led to changes in admission and eligibility. In 2021, U.S. News recognized it as one of the best charter schools in the country.

== Athletics ==
The school supports 21 sports teams in total. The Gryphons participate in region 2-AA in the Georgia High School Association. The school has won a total of 5 state titles and 31 region championships across all sports.

Sport	State Championships
Baseball	
Boys Basketball	
Girls Basketball	
Cheerleading	
Boys Cross Country	
Girls Cross Country	2019
Football	
Boys Golf	
Girls Golf	
Boys Soccer	
Girls Soccer	2019
Softball	2021
Swimming	
Boys Tennis	
Girls Tennis	
Boys Track	
Girls Track	
Volleyball	
Literary	2023
One Act Play	2022
