= St. Stephens Courthouse =

- Washington County Courthouse
- U.S. National Register of Historic Places
- Alabama Register of Landmarks and Heritage
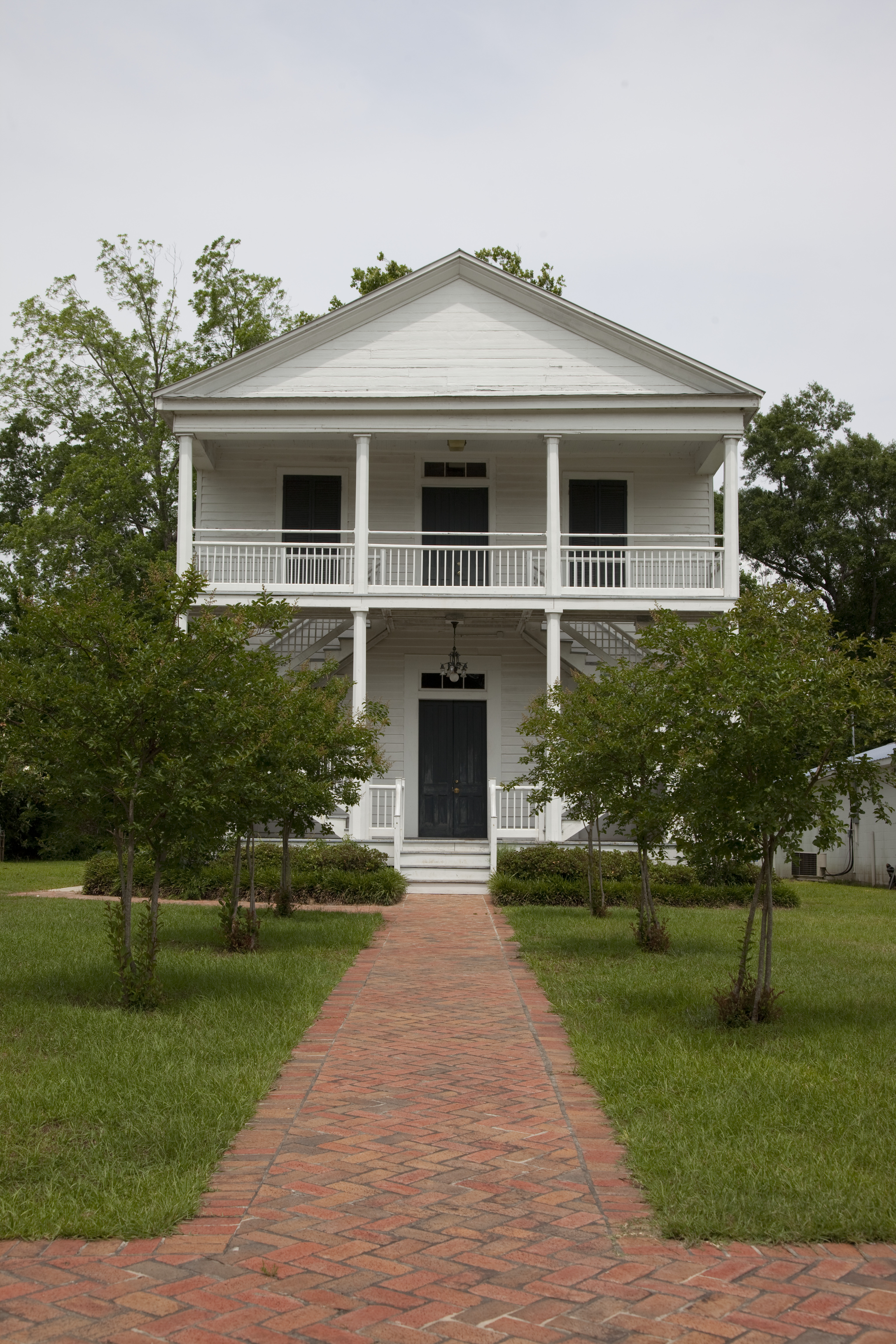

- Location within Alabama Location within the United States
- Location: Washington County 34. 0.5 mi. SE of jct. of Co. Rd. 34 and Old Stephens Rd., St. Stephens, Alabama
- Coordinates: 31°32′24″N 88°3′15″W
- Area: 1 acre (0.40 ha)
- Built: 1853-54
- Architect: Levin Jefferson Wilson
- Architectural style: Greek Revival
- NRHP reference No.: 97000655

Significant dates
- Added to NRHP: July 3, 1997
- Designated ARLH: October 11, 1978

The St. Stephens Courthouse, listed on the National Register of Historic Places as the Washington County Courthouse and also known as the St. Stephens Masonic Lodge, is a historic former courthouse building in St. Stephens, Alabama. The Alabama Legislature authorized construction of the building in 1853 to serve as headquarters for the government of Washington County. The building was completed in 1854 and served as the county courthouse until 1907, when the county seat was moved to Chatom. It served a variety of purposes after that, until being restored in 2000 by the St. Stephens Historical Commission for use as a visitor center and local history museum.
