= Thomas Canty (judge) =

American judge

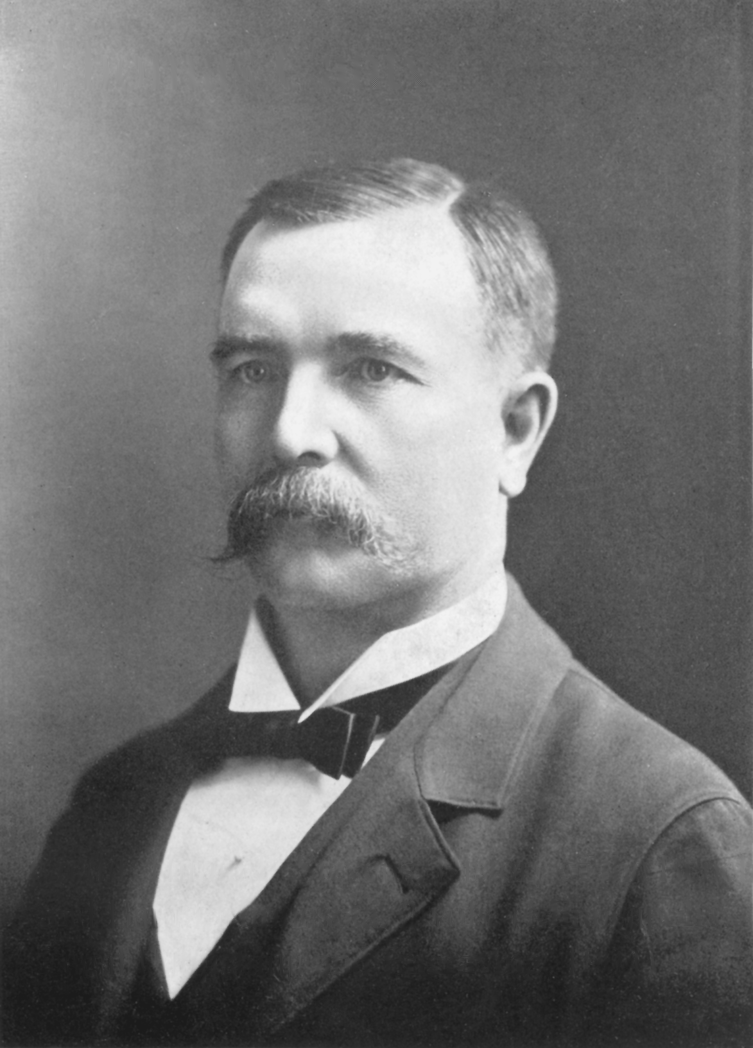
John Thomas Canty

John Thomas Canty (April 24, 1854 – May 1, 1920) was an American jurist.

== Career ==
Born in London, United Kingdom, Canty emigrated with his parents to the United States and settled in Detroit, Michigan and Lawler, Iowa. Canty moved to Minneapolis, Minnesota in 1880 and was admitted to the Minnesota bar in 1881. Canty served as a Minnesota district court judge for Hennepin County, Minnesota. He then served on the Minnesota Supreme Court from 1894 to 1899. Canty emigrated to Brazil to develop plantations and colonization projects. Canty died at his home in Currantinha, Brazil after getting lost while on an exploration, for three days, and being without food or water dying as a result from the effects.
