= Southwest Magnet High School =

Location
- 1775 Williamson Road; Macon, Georgia 31206; United States
- Coordinates: 32°48′21″N 83°40′25″W

Information
- School district: Bibb County School District
- CEEB code: 111952, 111963
- Principal: A. Bernard Young
- Teaching staff: 51.00 FTE
- Grades: 9–12
- Enrollment: 820 (2023–2024)
- Student to teacher ratio: 16.08
- Colors: Red, white, blue
- Team name: Patriots
- Website: southwest.bcsdk12.net

Southwest Magnet High School, also known as Southwest-Macon and Southwest Magnet High School and Law Academy, is a high school in Macon, Georgia, United States, serving students in grades 9–12. It is a unit of the Bibb County School System.

== Notable alumni ==
- Bobby Bryant, former NFL cornerback, Minnesota Vikings
- Milt Cuyler, former professional baseball player (Detroit Tigers, Boston Red Sox, Texas Rangers); current Hitting Coach of the Gulf Coast Twins
- Terry Fair (1960–2020), American-Israeli professional basketball player
- Jeff Malone, professional basketball player
- Norm Nixon, professional basketball player
- Sharone Wright, professional basketball player
