= Canty House =

Historic house in West Virginia, United States

- U.S. National Register of Historic Places
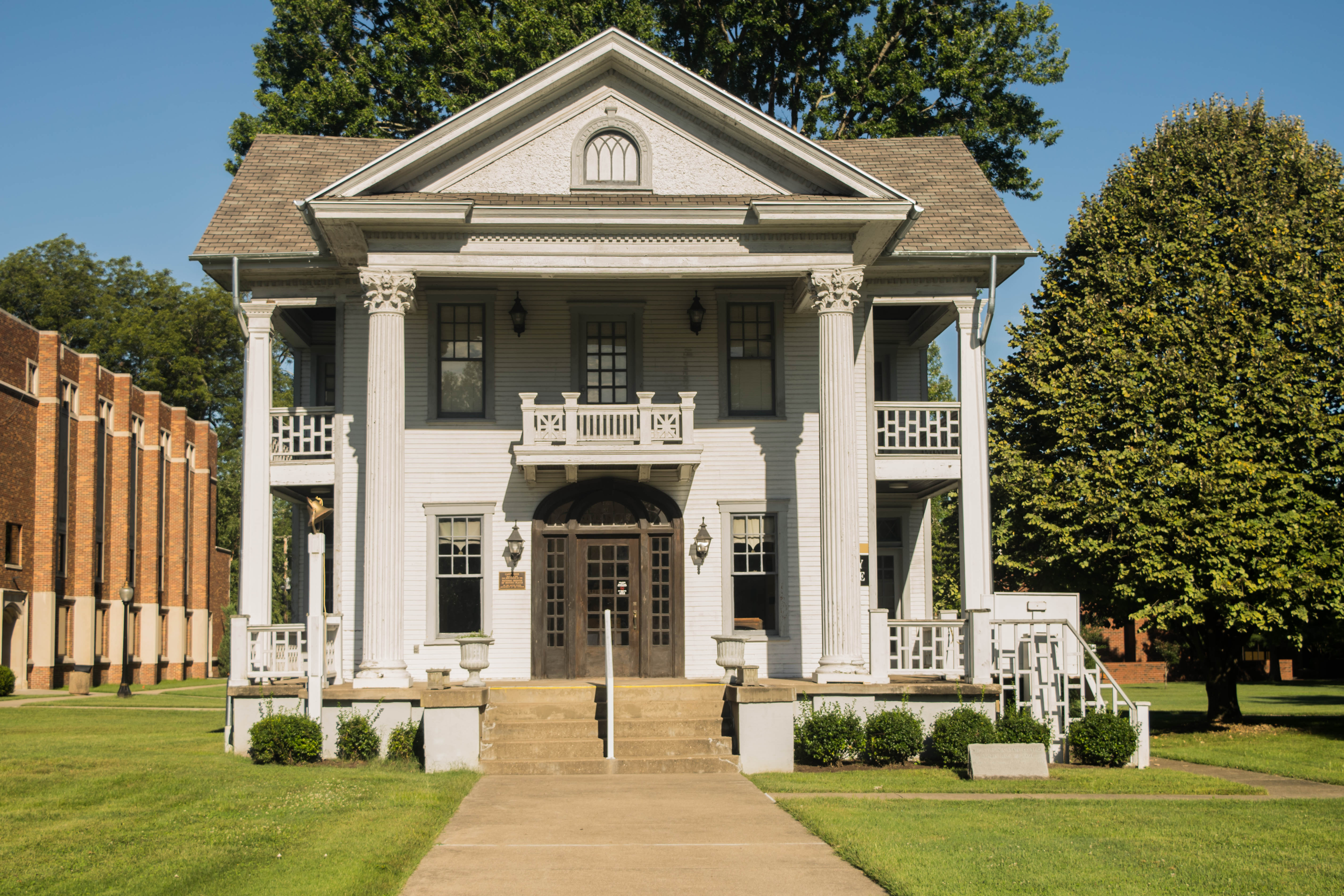

- Location within West Virginia Location within the United States
- Location: WV 25, Institute, West Virginia
- Coordinates: 38°22′57″N 81°45′48″W
- Area: 0.4 acres (0.16 ha)
- Built: 1900
- Built by: James M. Canty
- Architectural style: Classical Revival
- NRHP reference No.: 88001587
- Added to NRHP: September 23, 1988

Canty House, also known as "The Magnolia," is a historic home located on the campus of West Virginia State University at Institute, Kanawha County, West Virginia. It was built about 1900, as a simply designed, two-story frame farm house. In 1923, it was remodeled to its present form in the Classical Revival style. It has flanking two-story side galleries and a center pedimented pavilion. It features a two-story portico supported by two Corinthian order columns. It was originally the home of "Colonel" James M. Canty, one of the early instructors at the West Virginia Colored Institute.

It was listed on the National Register of Historic Places in 1988.
