= Canti (surname) =

Canti is a surname. Notable people with the name include:

- Aldo Canti (born 1961), Olympic sprinter
- Alfonso Canti (1920–1996), Italian weightlifter
- Claudio Canti (born 1965), Sammarinese football defender
- Dominique Canti (born 1967), Sanmarinese sprinter
- Giovanni Canti (painter) (died 1716), Italian painter
- Ronald Canti (1883–1936) British bacteriologist

== See also ==
- Canty (surname)
- Giovanni Canti, Italian music publishing firm named for its founder
