= Bibb County School District (Georgia) =

School district in Georgia (U.S. state)

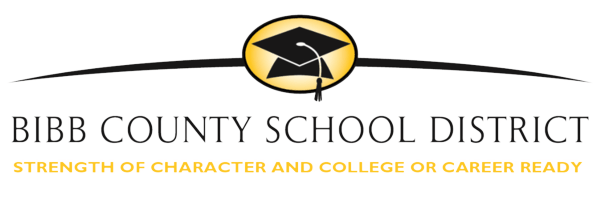

Address
- 484 Mulberry Street Macon, Georgia, 31201-7931; United States
- Coordinates: 32°50′12″N 83°37′34″W

District information
- Grades: Pre-kindergarten – 12
- Superintendent: Dr. Dan A. Sims
- Accreditation: AdvancED

Students and staff
- Enrollment: 21,334 (2024–25)
- Faculty: 1,547.90 (FTE)

Other information
- Website: bcsdk12.net

Bibb County School District is a school district which operates the public schools in Bibb County, Georgia, United States.

Its boundaries parallel that of the consolidated city-county.

== List of schools ==
=== Elementary schools ===
There are 21 elementary schools.

- Alexander II Magnet School
- Bernd Elementary School
- Bruce Elementary School
- Burdell-Hunt Magnet School
- Carter Elementary School
- Hartley Elementary School
- Heard Elementary School
- Heritage Elementary School
- Ingram-Pye Elementary School
- Dr. Martin Luther King Jr. Elementary School
- Lane Elementary School
- Porter Elementary School
- John R. Lewis Elementary School, named for U.S. congressman John R. Lewis
- Skyview Elementary School
- Southfield Elementary School
- Springdale Elementary School
- Rosa Taylor Elementary School
- Union Elementary School
- Veterans Elementary School
- Vineville Academy of the Arts
- Williams Elementary School

=== Middle schools ===
There are six middle schools.

- Appling Middle School
- Ballard-Hudson Middle School - built in 1949 after the merger of Ballard High School (originally Lewis High School, established in 1868 by the American Missionary Association) and Hudson High School, a public industrial high school
- Howard Middle School
- Miller Magnet Middle School
- Rutland Middle School
- Weaver Middle School

=== High schools ===
There are six high schools.

- Central High School
- Howard High School
- Northeast Magnet High School
- Rutland High School
- Southwest Magnet High School
- Westside High School

=== Charter schools ===
- Academy for Classical Education (ACE)
- Cirrus Academy (K-8)

=== Specialty schools ===
- Elam Alexander Academy
- Northwoods Early Childhood Academy

== Segregation ==
Bibb County Schools were de jure segregated (that is segregated under state law), with black students attending separate schools. Schools were racially integrated after court orders ending de jure segregation. The school system experienced de facto re-segregating circa 2017.
