= Hattie Canty =

African-American labor activist (1933–2012)

- Born: June 10, 1933; St. Stephens, Alabama
- Died: July 12, 2012 (aged 79); Las Vegas
- Citizenship: American
- Occupation: Labor activist

Hattie Canty (June 10, 1933 – July 12, 2012) was an African American labor activist in Las Vegas, Nevada. She has been called “one of the greatest strike leaders in U.S. history.”

== Early life and family ==
Canty was born in 1933 in rural St. Stephens, Alabama. She later moved with two children to San Diego, California where she worked as a cook and a housekeeper. In 1961, Canty moved to Las Vegas, Nevada. In 1972 she took as a job as a maid at Thunderbird Hotel. After her husband's death in 1975, she was left to support eight children on her own income. Canty found work first as a janitor at Clark County School District and later as a maid in private homes. Eventually, she found work at Maxim Hotel and Casino (later the Westin Las Vegas), which provided her and her children with access to health insurance.

== Labor organizing in Las Vegas ==
It was during her employment at Maxim Hotel that she became involved in the labor movement. She joined the Las Vegas Hotel and Culinary Workers Union Local 226 and was elected to their executive board. In 1984, Canty was part of planning a walkout strike of Las Vegas casino workers who demanded improved conditions and insurance benefits. The strike lasted for 75 days. In 1990, she was elected president of the Las Vegas Hotel and Culinary Workers Union Local 226. As president, she led a number of publicized strikes In 1991, Canty led a strike of 550 culinary workers from New Frontier Hotel and Gambling Hall in protest of unfair labor conditions. The strike was the longest labor strike in American history and lasted for six and a half years.

Canty helped to found the Culinary Training Academy of Las Vegas in 1993. The academy is still in operation and trains several thousand people every year for work in the hospitality industry. Their mission is “to reduce poverty and eliminate unemployment by providing employability and vocational skills to youth, adults, and displaced workers.” Its founding has been noted as one of Canty's crowning achievements.

== Death and legacy ==
Canty died in Las Vegas in 2012.

Canty is known for her work fighting for a living wage as well as her advocacy for minority involvement in the labor movement and workforce advancement. She organized a diverse labor union of workers from 84 different countries. Canty made the observation that “coming from Alabama, this seemed like the civil rights struggle... the labor movement and the civil rights movement, you cannot separate the two of them."
