= Howard High School (Macon, Georgia) =

Public secondary high school in Macon, Georgia, United States

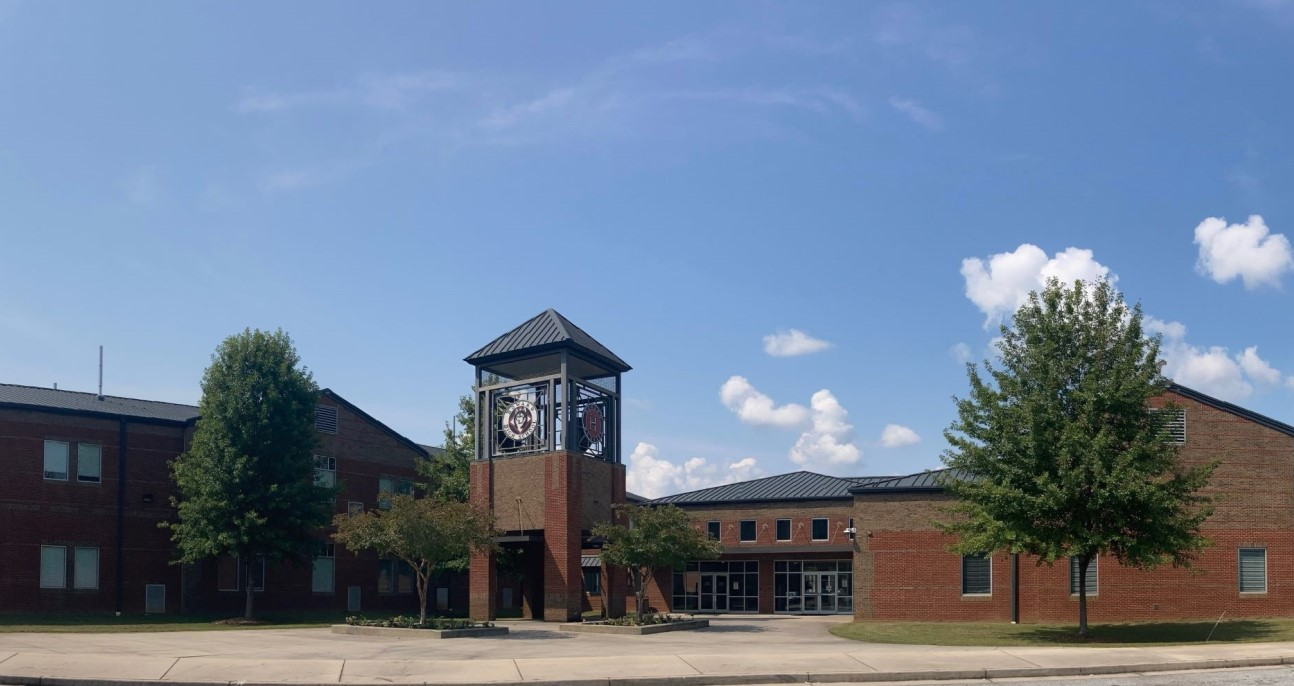

Location
- 6400 Forsyth Rd; Macon, Georgia 31210; United States
- 32°54′12″N 83°46′21″W

Information
- School type: Public
- Motto: Follow the PACK
- Established: 2008 (18 years ago)
- School district: Bibb County School District
- CEEB code: 111974
- Principal: Michael Scott
- Teaching staff: 69.30 (FTE)
- Grades: 9-12
- Enrollment: 1,133 (2023-2024)
- Student to teacher ratio: 16.35
- Colors: Black, maroon, white
- Mascot: Husky
- Website: howardhs.bcsdk12.net

Howard High School (HHS) is a public secondary school located in the Bibb County School District in Macon, Georgia, United States. Built on the site of a former Christmas tree farm, it opened in 2008. It offers AP classes, Career and Technology programs, a leadership program, and classes for second language learners.

== Description ==
Howard High School in Bibb County School District is located in a racially and socioeconomically diverse community in a "rural fringe" region of middle Georgia, southeast of Atlanta. It is a Title I School. It serves students in grades 9 through 12, with a total student population of 1,210 students in the 2020–2021 school year, and a student-teacher ratio of 17.26. Minority enrollment is 81% of the student body (majority Black), which is higher than the Georgia state average of 62% (majority Black). All students "are eligible to participate in the Free Lunch and Reduced-Price Lunch Programs under the National School Lunch Act of 1946".

HHS offers programs and courses in Advanced Placement, work-based learning, English for Speakers of Other Languages, Leadership Enterprise for a Diverse America, and Career and Technology.

HHS was the only high school in Bibb County in 2011 to make "Adequate Yearly Progress", a designation that determines whether schools meeti standards under the No Child Left Behind Act. It relies on "test participation, academic achievement and other indicators, such as the attendance or graduation rates at a school".

Middle Georgia's "Climate Star Ratings" are based on four measures of school climate that include a combination of hard data and surveys: "surveys of parents, students and teachers; discipline data; substance-abuse data and survey results; and attendance". HHS received a rating of 3 stars (out of 4) in 2014.

According to U.S. News & World Report's 2017 national rankings, Howard High School in Bibb County earned a silver medal, as No. 55 in Georgia and No. 2,000 in the nation. In 2022, Howard High School was ranked no. 1 in Macon in 2022, with an 83% graduation rate, a 15.9 college readiness score, and an enrollment of 1,210. In the overall Georgia ranking, the school ranked no. 137.

Georgia's School Grades report for 2020-2021 presented a performance snapshot of HHS including these points:

- "Its four-year graduation rate is 85.4%, which is higher than 31% of high schools in the state and higher than its district."
- "51.3% of graduates are college ready."

In February 2022, the CBS station WMAZ-TV highlighted Howard High School's newly opened "Howling Huskie" coffee shop as "real-life coffee shop experience while students get real-life work experience". HHS students in the Career, Technical and Agricultural Education (CTAE) program run the café.

== History ==
Opened in 2008, the $28 million school complex was dedicated in 2009, "the result of a long grassroots campaign to build a high school in the fast-growing northern part of Bibb County". In 1999, the Bibb County School District had bought a Christmas tree farm on Forsyth Road, and secured funding with a sales tax approved by voters to build schools in the northern and southern parts of the county. A second sales tax initiative, passed in 2004, was needed to complete construction on Howard High in north Bibb County.

In 2011, athletic facilities under construction at HHS included "a field house for its football team, as well as a new tennis court, baseball and softball fields and other facilities, to add to its existing practice fields."
