= Anthony Canty =

German basketball player (born 1991)

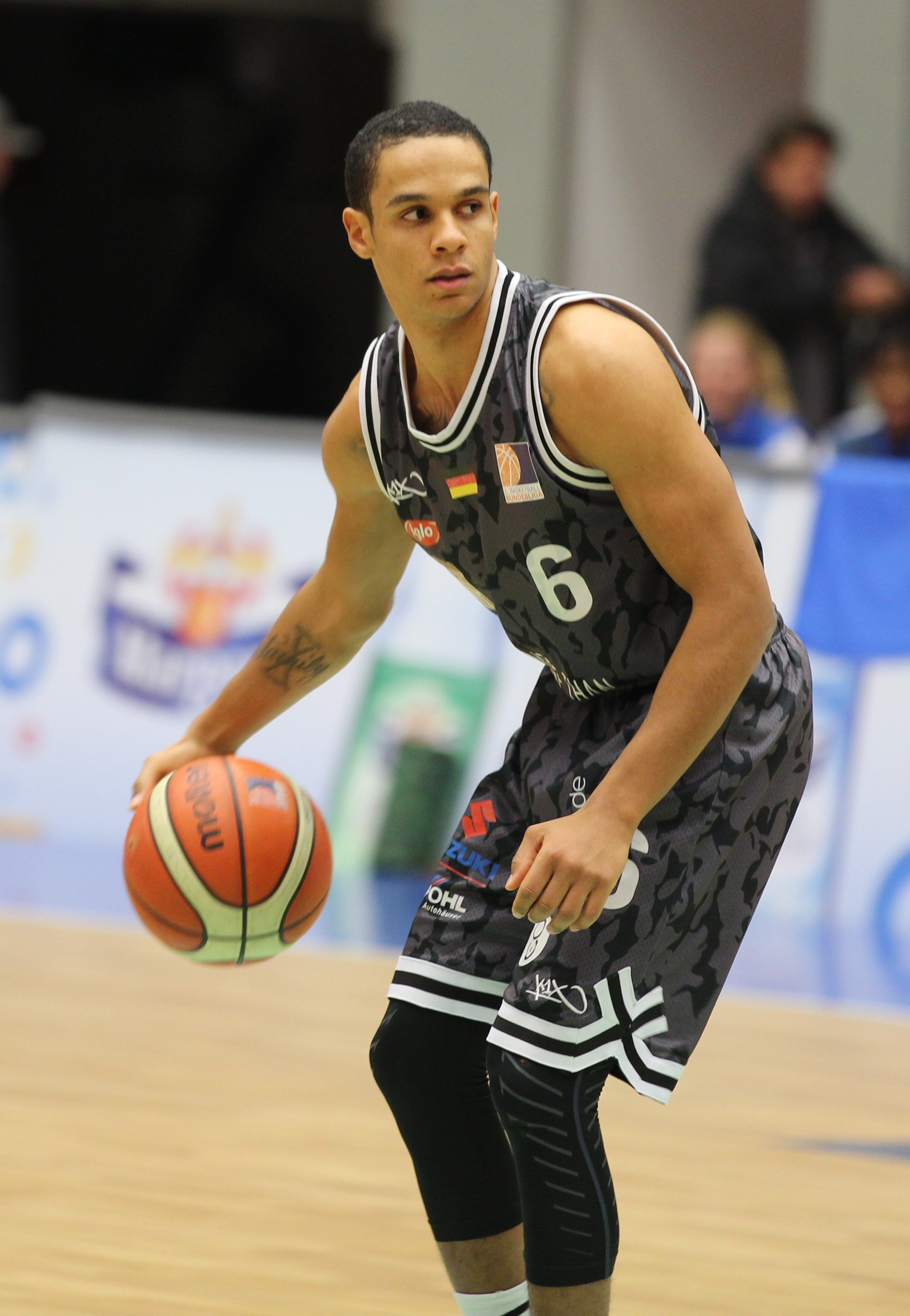
- Canty with the Hamburg Towers, 2016

No. 6 – Eisbären Bremerhaven
- Position: Point guard
- League: Basketball Bundesliga

Personal information
- Born: 12 February 1991 (age 34) Berlin, Germany
- Listed height: 6 ft 0 in (1.83 m)
- Listed weight: 158 lb (72 kg)

Career information
- NBA draft: 2013: undrafted
- Playing career: 2009–present

Career history
- 2009–2013: Eisbären Bremerhaven
- 2010–2011: →Cuxhaven BasCats
- 2013–2015: TBB Trier
- 2015–2018: Hamburg Towers
- 2018–present: Eisbären Bremerhaven

Anthony Canty (born 12 February 1991) is a German professional basketball player for Eisbären Bremerhaven of the German Basketball Bundesliga.

== Professional career ==
At age 18, Canty joined Eisbären Bremerhaven, playing 4 games during the 2009–10 season.

Canty spent intermittent stints with other teams between his career with Bremerhaven. His time with the Cuxhaven BasCats was played during the 2010–11 season. He played a total of 22 games during which he averaged 5.6 points, 1.5 rebounds and 1.2 assists.

In 2013, Canty declared for the NBA draft and was not selected. He resumed his career in German professional basketball.

Canty's next tenure was with the TBB Trier from 2013–15, playing two seasons. He played a total of 26 games, playing his longest minutes (13.06) during the 2014–15 season. He averaged 3.3 points, 1.4 rebounds and 1.0 assists.

Canty played for the Hamburg Towers for two seasons from 2015–17. He played 50 total games and averaged 9.6 points, 2.4 rebounds and 2.4 assists during the 2015–16 season. During the 2016–17 season, Canty averaged 15.3 points, 3.0 rebounds and 4.1 assists.

In 2018, he returned to play full-time for Eisbären Bremerhaven.
