= Westside High School (Macon, Georgia) =

Public high school in Macon, Georgia, United States

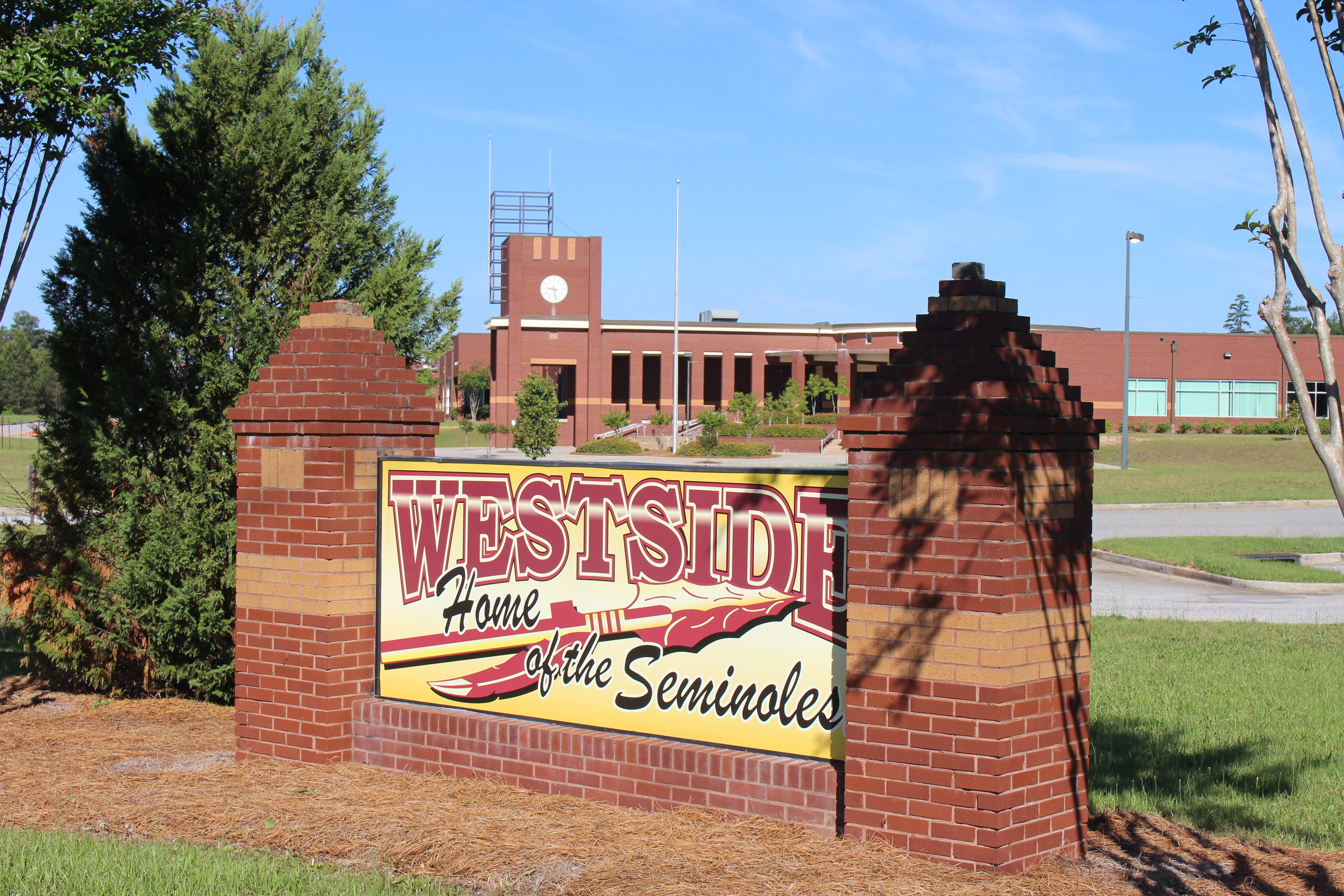

Location
- 2851 Heath Road; Macon, Georgia 31206; United States; 32°48′58″N 83°44′52″W

Information
- Type: Public
- Motto: "We Are Westside! We are the Future!"
- Established: 1997 (29 years ago)
- School district: Bibb County School District
- CEEB code: 111967
- Principal: Crystal Graham Childers.
- Teaching staff: 59.50 (FTE)
- Enrollment: 1,010 (2023–2024)
- Student to teacher ratio: 16.97
- Campus type: Suburban
- Colors: Garnet and gold
- Athletics: Baseball, basketball, softball, soccer, swimming, tennis, track, cross country, and wrestling
- Athletics conference: Georgia High School Association (GHSA)
- Mascot: Seminoles
- Website: westside.bcsdk12.net

Westside High School is a public high school located in Macon, Georgia, United States. The school opened in 1997 and serves grades 9 through 12. It is the largest school in the Bibb County School District.

== Athletics ==
The Westside Seminoles has competed in Division AAAA Region 2 of the Georgia High School Association since the 2012–2013 school year.
