= Northeast High School (Macon, Georgia) =

Northeast Health Science Magnet High School

Location
- 1646 Upper River Road; Macon, Georgia 31211; United States
- Coordinates: 32°51′59″N 83°37′15″W

Information
- School district: Bibb County Public Schools
- CEEB code: 111953
- Principal: Donna Walker-Thompson
- Teaching staff: 52.10 (FTE) (as of 2024-2025)
- Grades: 9-12
- Enrollment: 794 (as of 2024-2025)
- Student to teacher ratio: 15.24 (as of 2024-2025)
- Colors: Red, black and gold
- Mascot: Raiders
- Website: northeast.bcsdk12.net

Northeast Health Science Magnet High School is a high school in Macon, Georgia, United States. It is part of the Bibb County School District.

Northeast consists of the combination of former Mark Smith High School, H. S. Lasseter High School, and Peter G. Appling High School.

Northeast's feeder schools include Peter G. Appling Middle School, Florence Bernd Elementary School, Burdell-Hunt Magnet Elementary School and Dr. Martin Luther King, Jr. Elementary School.

== Notable alumni ==
- Bill Berry, founding member of R.E.M.
- Craig Hertwig, professional football player
- Al Lucas, professional football player
- Mike Mills, founding member of R.E.M.
- Lydia Meredith author and activist
- Hugh Robertson, professional basketball player
- Corey Williams, NBA basketball player
