= James Canty III =

American chess player and streamer (born 1992)

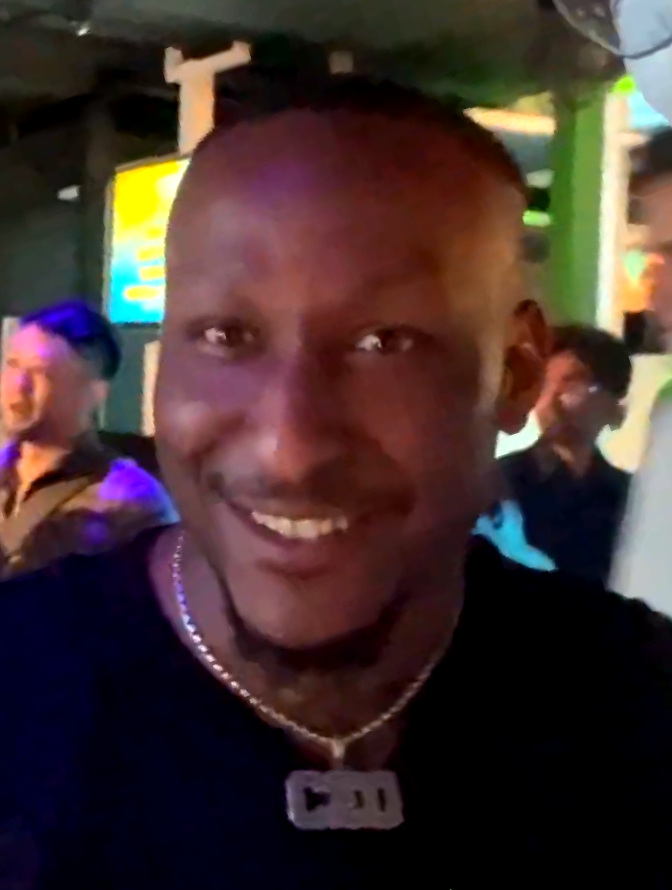
- Canty in 2024

Personal information
- Born: July 6, 1992 (age 34) Detroit, Michigan

Chess career
- Country: United States
- Title: FIDE Master (2022)
- Peak rating: 2353 (November 2015)

Twitch information
- Channel: GMCanty
- Followers: 55,800
- Last updated: February 28, 2024

James H. Canty III is an American chess player and streamer.

== Career ==
Canty began playing chess at age 8 after being introduced to the game by his father, and was able to beat him within a year. He attended Bates Academy, a Detroit primary school for gifted students, where he joined the school's chess team and trained under Harold Steen.

He became a USCF Master at age 17 and has won a number of chess championships in Michigan, also qualifying for the Denker Tournament of High School Champions twice.

He was one of many chess streamers who became more popular during the COVID-19 pandemic.

In September 2025, he became the Super Heavyweight Chessboxing World Champion by defeating Evgenii Isaev in the final round of the 7th World Chessboxing Championships in Loznica, Serbia.
