= National Register of Historic Places listings in Putnam County, West Virginia =

Location of Putnam County in West Virginia

This is a list of the National Register of Historic Places listings in Putnam County, West Virginia.

This is intended to be a complete list of the properties and districts on the National Register of Historic Places in Putnam County, West Virginia, United States. The locations of National Register properties and districts for which the latitude and longitude coordinates are included below, may be seen in an online map.

There are 7 properties and districts listed on the National Register in the county.

This National Park Service list is complete through NPS recent listings posted March 6, 2026.

Contents: Counties in West Virginia

Barbour - Berkeley - Boone - Braxton - Brooke - Cabell - Calhoun - Clay - Doddridge - Fayette - Gilmer - Grant - Greenbrier - Hampshire - Hancock - Hardy - Harrison - Jackson - Jefferson - Kanawha - Lewis - Lincoln - Logan - Marion - Marshall - Mason - McDowell - Mercer - Mineral - Mingo - Monongalia - Monroe - Morgan - Nicholas - Ohio - Pendleton - Pleasants - Pocahontas - Preston - Putnam - Raleigh - Randolph - Ritchie - Roane - Summers - Taylor - Tucker - Tyler - Upshur - Wayne - Webster - Wetzel - Wirt - Wood - Wyoming

== Current listings ==
	Name on the Register	Image	Date listed	Location	City or town	Description
1	Asbury House	Asbury House	March 21, 1997 (#97000266)	2922 Putnam Ave. 38°26′02″N 82°01′08″W	Hurricane	
2	Buffalo Indian Village Site		January 25, 1971 (#71000883)	Address Restricted	Buffalo	
3	Buffalo Town Square Historic District	Buffalo Town Square Historic District	August 16, 1991 (#91001009)	Junction of WV 62 and High St. 38°37′04″N 81°58′49″W	Buffalo	
4	Eleanor Historic District		May 4, 2023 (#100008824)	Fir, Gum, Beech, Dogwood, Cherry, Chestnut, Cypress, Ivywood, Hemlock, Juniper, Kapok, Locust, Maple, and Nutmeg Sts., Park Rd., Eleanor and Ash Cirs., Roosevelt Blvd. 38°32′16″N 81°55′31″W	Eleanor	
5	James W. Hoge House	James W. Hoge House	July 27, 2007 (#07000783)	Hoge Ln. 38°31′56″N 81°53′22″W	Winfield	
6	Putnam County Courthouse	Putnam County Courthouse	July 5, 2000 (#00000775)	3389 Winfield Rd. 38°32′01″N 81°53′32″W	Winfield	
7	Winfield Toll Bridge	Winfield Toll Bridge	December 15, 2011 (#11000931)	WV 34 mile 21.34; 38°32′04″N 81°53′53″W	Winfield	

== See also ==
- List of National Historic Landmarks in West Virginia
- National Register of Historic Places listings in West Virginia
