= List of West Virginia tornadoes =

Tornadoes are relatively uncommon in West Virginia, averaging roughly two per year. Although tornadoes have occurred in every month of the year in West Virginia; they are most common between the months of April and July. The strongest tornadoes confirmed in West Virginia were two F4 tornadoes, both in the northern part of the state and both occurring on June 23, 1944.

== Climatology ==
As of April 2026, there have been at least 193 tornadoes confirmed in the state of West Virginia since 1875. Recorded events have increased in frequency due to more cameras and cell phones, as well as drone surveying tools. In 2024, there were 18 tornadoes in the state, breaking the record for most annual tornadoes, previously set in 1998 with 14 tornadoes. From 1993 to 2022, the state averaged two tornadoes per year.

There are five West Virginia counties that have never reported a tornado. Conversely, Kanawha County has experienced the most events, with 16 tornadoes since 1875.

== Events ==
=== Pre-1950 ===
- August 11, 1875 – The first ever recorded tornado event occurred when a tornado touched down in Ritchie County.
- June 23, 1944 – A tornado outbreak produced at least 3 major tornadoes in West Virginia, including the deadliest ever recorded in the state, the 1944 Shinnston tornado.

=== 1960–1969 ===
- February 25, 1961 – The only known tornado to ever occur in West Virginia during the month of February struck Fayette County as an F2.

=== 1970–1979 ===
- April 4, 1974 – Six tornadoes were confirmed in the early morning hours of April 4; all of the tornadoes were in southern West Virginia. The highest rating was an F3. There was one fatality in Fayette County.

=== 1990–1999 ===
- July 1996 – Three tornadoes touched down within two weeks of each other. The first tornado occurred on July 19 in Preston County. The other two occurred on July 30. One in Wetzel County and the other in Marion County. All three tornadoes were rated F1.
- January 1998 – Two tornadoes touched down within a day of each other. The first was an F2 in Wood County on January 8. The second was an F1 on January 9 in Marshall County.
- June 2, 1998 – Six tornadoes touched down across West Virginia. At the time, it tied the record set in 1974 for the largest tornado outbreak ever to occur in the state. A record which would stand until a tornado outbreak in April 2024 produced 10 tornadoes.

=== 2000-2009 ===
- May 23, 2000 – A brief F1 tornado occurred in Tyler County in the Kidwell area.
- August 9, 2000 – Three tornadoes touched down in western West Virginia. The first one was an F1 tornado that touched down in Lawrence County, Ohio before crossing the Ohio River into Cabell County causing damage in the Lesage area. The second tornado was an F0 tornado that occurred near Winfield in Putnam County. No structures were damaged but debris was blown onto roadways in the tornado's path. The third tornado was another F1 tornado that occurred near Branchland in Lincoln County. The NCDC report stated that "Trees were chopped off midway up their trunk, plus bark was peeled off of other trees. Dwellings suffered roof damage. At least 2 mobile homes were destroyed along Peyton Branch Road."
- May 21, 2001 – An F0 tornado touched down near the Wadeville area of Wood County. Two barns were damaged and a mobile home was destroyed.
- April 28, 2002 – An F1 tornado touched down about one-half-mile northeast of the town of St. Joseph in Marshall County. It traveled about 1 mile (1.6 km) before dissipating. The tornado destroyed a barn and damaged several others. Shingles were blown from a house. There were numerous trees toppled or snapped. This storm was also responsible for producing very large hail.
- July 2003 – Two tornadoes touched down only a day apart. The first tornado was an F0 that occurred on July 9 in Jefferson County, causing damage to trees and buildings along a 4-mile (6.4 km) stretch. The second tornado occurred in Wood County the next day, on July 10. This tornado was an F2 that caused significant damage to the Lubeck area. No deaths or injuries occurred.
- May 21, 2004 – An F0 tornado touched down in Berkeley County causing minor tree damage in the Arden area.
- September 17, 2004 – Three tornadoes touched down in the Eastern Panhandle of West Virginia. The strongest tornado was rated an F2. Six people were injured when the tornado crossed I-81.
- June 27, 2007 – An EF1 tornado touched down in the Letart area of Mason County. This was the first tornado in West Virginia to be rated using the Enhanced Fujita Scale.
- March 9, 2008 – An EF0 tornado touched down in Youngs Bottom in Kanawha County, the tornado downed several trees, caused structural damage to several structures, and rolled a camper into a telephone pole. A pontoon boat was lifted onto a fence.
- May and July 2008 – Two tornadoes touched down in Preston County within two months of each other. The first one happened on May 31 in the Arr area; the second tornado touched down on July 30 in the Glade Farms area. Both tornadoes were rated EF0.

=== 2010–2019 ===
- September 16, 2010 – An EF3 tornado occurred in Wood and Wirt Counties. This tornado was the strongest tornado in an outbreak that resulted in five tornadoes in Ohio. One person died on the West Virginia side of the Ohio River. The last direct death from a tornado in West Virginia was in June 1982. A sixth tornado affected Wirt County, West Virginia.
- April 27, 2011 – West Virginia was on the northern fringe of the large severe weather outbreak that occurred across the southern states, northeast into Virginia. A strengthening low pressure center tracked from Arkansas to Ohio. A strong wind flow existed aloft. During most of the daylight hours on April 27, the convection remained weak in West Virginia. As mid and upper level dynamics increased late in the afternoon and early evening, a large area of showers streaked northeast into West Virginia. Heavier convection was embedded on the southeastern inflow flank of this large area of rain. This affected the mountainous counties. Straight line wind damage was common in Raleigh County north into Randolph County. The most damage was in the city of Elkins from straight line winds. A short lived EF1 tornado was confirmed in Nicholas County, which was the only tornado confirmed in West Virginia from the outbreak. This was also the first tornado confirmed in Nicholas County since 1969.
- March 2, 2012 – Three tornadoes occurred in West Virginia. Including an EF3 tornado (the same tornado that severely damaged West Liberty, Kentucky which crossed the state line from Kentucky into West Virginia, causing damage to the Cove Gap area before dissipating in Lincoln County near Ranger. A second EF1 tornado tracked through the central part of Lincoln County. The third tornado was a long tracked EF3 tornado that damaged Salyersville, Kentucky and briefly crossed into Mingo County as it was dissipating. There were no fatalities in West Virginia from this tornado outbreak.
- June 2014 – A brief EF1 tornado touched down on June 4 and damaged a structure and also caused considerable tree damage in the Ona area of Cabell County. Four days later on June 8, another EF1 tornado touched down in Berkeley County.
- June 18, 2015 – An EF1 tornado briefly touched down in Upshur County causing damage to trees and to a couple of buildings in the Queens area.
- December 23, 2015 – A short-lived EF0 tornado struck Wood County. This tornado was only the third tornado on record to strike West Virginia in the month of December, and the first since 1978.
- June 16, 2016 – A brief EF0 tornado impacted Monongalia County near the community of Cassville.
- June 21, 2016 – Three tornadoes struck West Virginia. Including an EF1 tornado near Richwood in Nicholas County, an EF0 tornado in Greenbrier County, and another EF1 tornado in Barbour County.
- June 23, 2016 – A brief EF1 tornado touched down in the Kenna area of Jackson County. The brief tornado lifted and rolled a single-wide trailer, injuring its two occupants; minor damage occurred elsewhere along its path. The tornado was part of the same storm system that caused devastating flooding across the state.
- July 4, 2016 – Three tornadoes touched down in western West Virginia. All of them were rated EF0. The tornadoes occurred in Wayne County near Fort Gay; in Lincoln County near Yawkey; and in Kanawha County near South Charleston.
- June 23, 2017 – Three tornadoes touched down in northern West Virginia. The tornadoes were associated with the remnants of Tropical Storm Cindy.
- July 5, 2017 – A short lived EF0 tornado touched down near Charles Town in Jefferson County.
- June 27, 2018 – A short lived weak EF0 tornado touched down in Monongalia County. Winds were estimated to be between 65 and 70 mph.
- June 24, 2019 – Two tornadoes touched down in Kanawha County; an EF1 tornado touched down near Alum Creek and traveled northeast dissipating near the Kanawha River. Shortly after, a second tornado, this one an EF0; caused damage near Yeager Airport.

=== 2020–present ===
- May 3, 2021 – A short lived EF1 tornado touched down in the Ranson community in Jefferson County. Along Robelei Drive just west of West Virginia Route 115/Mildred Street. One homeowner with a personal home anemometer measured an unofficial 68 mph (109 km/h) wind gust. In addition, one person was injured.
- June 14, 2021 – A short lived EF0 tornado touched down in Marion County near Fairmont. Considerable tree damage was reported, especially along Stoney Road.
- July 12, 2022 – Two brief EF0 tornadoes touched down in Hampshire County
- August 1, 2022 – A short lived EF2 tornado touched down along the Marshall-Ohio County line before crossing into Pennsylvania and dissipating shortly thereafter.
- August 7, 2023 – An EF1 tornado touched down near Louisa in Lawrence County, Kentucky before crossing the state line into Wayne County and causing damage near Fort Gay.
- April 2, 2024 – 10 tornadoes touched down throughout the state; making this the largest tornado outbreak in state history. The strongest tornado during this event was a high end EF2 in Fayette County. Many of the tornadoes were as the result of a derecho which moved through the state during the mid-morning hours. Aside from the tornadoes, there was also widespread straight line wind damage as well. No one died but two people were injured by the tornadoes.
- May 9, 2024 – An EF1 tornado struck rural areas of Wood County which flipped a mobile home, causing minor injuries to one person.
- May 26, 2024 – A brief EF0 tornado was confirmed in the Winfield area of Putnam County as a large squall line moved through.
- June 5, 2024 – Three tornadoes hit the Eastern Panhandle of West Virginia in Berkeley and Jefferson Counties. All were rated EF0.
- September 25, 2024 – A brief tornado was captured on video near Hillsboro in Pocahontas County. The tornado was rated EFU because the tornado did not cause any damage; and as such, the maximum winds are unknown. This was the first tornado on record to be confirmed in the county.
- April 29, 2026 – A high end EF1 tornado, with maximum winds of around 110 mph (180 km/h), touched down between US-19 and Whispering Pines Lane in the Pine Grove community of Fayette County. The tornado skipped along in an east-southeasterly direction with the damage path ending near the intersection of Mountain Vista Dr and US-60 in the Lookout community. Interestingly, this tornado crossed US-60 just 1.9 miles (3.1 km) south of where an EF2 tornado crossed on April 2, 2024.
- July 21, 2026 – At least two confirmed tornadoes struck the western side of the state, with one near Sistersville and moving through rural Tyler County, and another confirmed over Pennsboro and moving through rural Ritchie County. Storm damage is still being assessed.

== Climatological statistics ==
The following is a chart showing tornadoes that have impacted West Virginia up to 2024.

Recorded tornadoes affecting West Virginia by month
Month	Number of tornadoes
January	2
February	1
March	12
April	29
May	18
June	55
July	38
August	22
September	11
October	6
November	1
December	3

Recorded tornadoes affecting West Virginia by time period
Period	Number of tornadoes
1800s	8
1900–49	14
1950s	8
1960s	19
1970s	29
1980s	18
1990s	31
2000s	17
2010s	32
2020s	25

== See also ==
- Climate of West Virginia
- Lists of tornadoes and tornado outbreaks
