= Red House, West Virginia =

Red House
- Unincorporated community
- Location within the state of West Virginia
- Coordinates: 38°32′21″N 81°53′48″W
- Country: United States
- State: West Virginia
- County: Putnam
- Time zone: UTC-5 (Eastern (EST))
  - Summer (DST): UTC-4 (EDT)
- ZIP codes: 25168
- GNIS feature ID: 1545453

Red House is a small unincorporated community located in Putnam County in the U.S. state of West Virginia. The community is divided into two distinct areas: Red House (Proper) which follows the Kanawha River Valley along WV 62, and Red House Hill along WV 34 which is in the hills just off the Kanawha River Valley. The Red House Post Office is still in service and was founded on September 26, 1840. Some say the town was named for a red house which stood at the town site, while others believe nearby red rock formations account for the name.

== Geography ==
Red House is located on WV 62 which generally follows the Kanawha River, between Hometown and Eleanor, and consists primarily of single family homes.

The Red House Hill area is primarily a mix of hilly 20 to 100 acres (8.1 to 40.5 hectares) farms (including cattle, horses, corn, etc.), and small land plots whose owners are commuters to the Charleston and Huntington metropolitan and surrounding areas.

The closest neighbors to Red House are Confidence, Hometown, Winfield, and Eleanor.

Due to the extremely winding mountain terrain, WV 34 is a very dangerous road for a 21-mile stretch from its junction with WV 62 to Kenna, where it intersects with County Route 21, which provides access to I-77. Because of the winding nature of WV 34 and the proximity to the Putnam County line, the road actually passes through Putnam County, Kanawha County and finally Jackson County, several times along the 21 mile length.

== Education ==
Public education in the area is served by Confidence Elementary School (located in Confidence), Buffalo Elementary School (located in Buffalo), Buffalo High School (also located in Buffalo), George Washington Elementary School (located in Eleanor), George Washington Middle School (also located in Eleanor), and Poca High School (located in Poca).

== Fire service ==
Fire service in the area is primarily provided by the Route 34 Volunteer Fire Department & 2nd due, Eleanor Volunteer Fire Department.

== Churches ==
Five churches exist in Red House: United Brethren Church, (Red House hill); Wade Chapel United Methodist Church, (Red House hill); Riverside Baptist Church, (Red House proper); Lone Oak Church of God, (Red House hill); and Grandview Baptist Church, (Red House hill).
