= Demers =

Demers is a surname. Notable people with the surname include:

- Coralie Demers (born 2010), Canadian artistic gymnast
- Dominique Demers (born 1956), doctor of children's literature, Quebec writer and screenwriter
- Eugene L. Demers (1842–1912), New York politician
- Gaston Demers (1935–2004), Canadian politician
- Isabelle Demers (born 1982), Canadian organist
- Jacques Demers (born 1944), Canadian hockey coach
- John Demers (born 1971), American attorney
- Jason Demers (born 1988), Canadian ice hockey player
- Jérôme Demers (1774–1853), Canadian educator
- Louis Julien Demers (1848–1905), merchant and federal politician from Quebec
- Louis Philippe Demers (1863–1951), lawyer and federal politician from Quebec
- Louis-Philippe Demers (1922–1996), honorable pharmacist from the Quebec region
- Modeste Demers (1809–1871), Canadian bishop
- Nicole Demers (1950–2023), Canadian politician
- Patrick Demers (born 1969), Quebec filmmaker
- Paul Demers (1956–2016), Franco-Ontarian singer native of Gatineau
- Philippe Demers (1919–1999), Canadian politician
- Rock Demers (1933–2021), Quebec film producer, actor and screenwriter
- Sébastien Demers (born 1979), a.k.a. Double Trouble, Canadian boxer
- Stéphane Demers (born 1966), singer and actor from Quebec
- Tony Demers (1917–1997), Quebec ice hockey player

== Other uses ==
- Demers Island, in the Richelieu River in Carignan, Canada

== See also ==
- Demens (disambiguation)
- Demer, a Belgian river
