= Teays Valley, West Virginia =

- Census-designated place
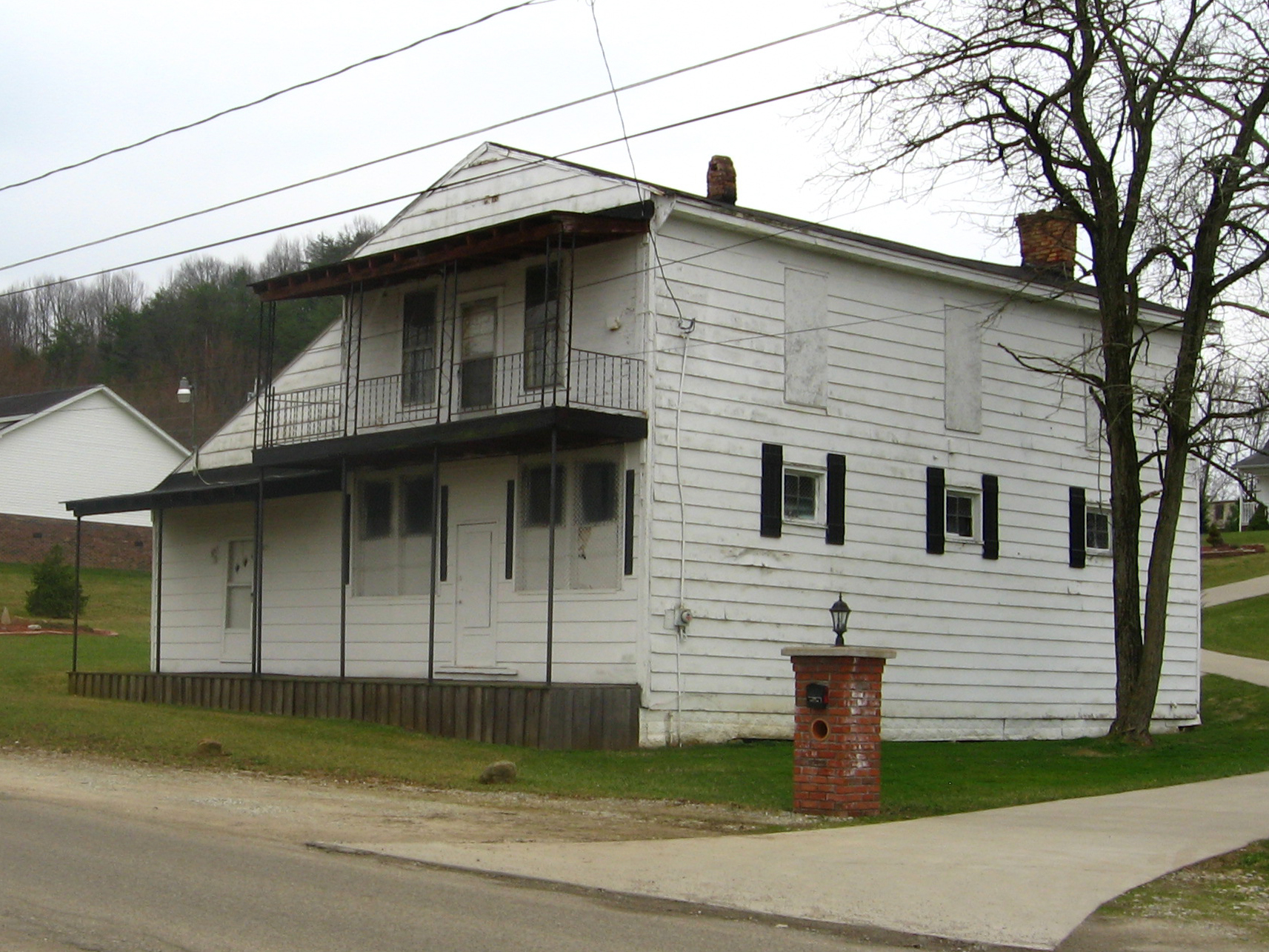
- Former train depot, now demolished

- Location in West Virginia Location in the United States
- Coordinates: 38°26′50″N 81°56′14″W
- Country: United States
- State: West Virginia
- County: Putnam

Area
  - Total: 7.3 sq mi (18.8 km^{2})
  - Land: 7.2 sq mi (18.6 km^{2})
  - Water: 0.12 sq mi (0.3 km^{2})
- Elevation: 666 ft (203 m)

Population (2020)
  - Total: 14,350
  - Density: 2,000/sq mi (772/km^{2})
- Time zone: UTC-5 (Eastern (EST))
  - Summer (DST): UTC-4 (EDT)
- Area code: 304
- FIPS code: 54-79545
- GNIS feature ID: 1867651

Teays Valley (/ˈteɪz/ TAYZ) is a census-designated place in Putnam County, West Virginia, United States. The population was 14,350 at the 2020 census. Located about 20 miles (32 km) west of Charleston and 30 miles (48 km) east of Huntington, it is part of the Huntington–Ashland metropolitan area.

The community is divided by the two magisterial districts of Teays and Scott. It was named for Thomas Teays, a hunter and trapper who once spent a considerable amount of time in the vicinity.

== Geography ==
Teays Valley is located at 38°26′50″N 81°56′14″W (38.447204, -81.937324).

According to the United States Census Bureau, the CDP has a total area of 7.3 square miles (18.8 km^{2}), of which 7.2 square miles (18.6 km^{2}) is land and 0.1 square mile (0.3 km^{2}) (1.34%) is water.

The valley referred to by "Teays Valley" is a portion of the remains of the pre-glacial Teays River. Geologist William G. Tight (1865–1910) named the preglacial Teays River after Teays, which lies in the "riverless" Teays Valley that once was the bottom of the river. Today, the valley's water is shed through a number of creeks which empty into the Kanawha and Mud rivers.

== Demographics ==
Historical population
Census	Pop.	Note	%±
2000	12,704		—
2010	13,175		3.7%
2020	14,350		8.9%
U.S. Decennial Census

=== 2020 census ===
As of the 2020 census, Teays Valley had a population of 14,350. The median age was 42.3 years. 22.4% of residents were under the age of 18 and 21.2% of residents were 65 years of age or older. For every 100 females there were 92.5 males, and for every 100 females age 18 and over there were 89.3 males age 18 and over.

99.0% of residents lived in urban areas, while 1.0% lived in rural areas.

There were 5,790 households in Teays Valley, of which 31.2% had children under the age of 18 living in them. Of all households, 55.1% were married-couple households, 14.8% were households with a male householder and no spouse or partner present, and 24.7% were households with a female householder and no spouse or partner present. About 26.6% of all households were made up of individuals and 13.6% had someone living alone who was 65 years of age or older.

There were 6,157 housing units, of which 6.0% were vacant. The homeowner vacancy rate was 1.7% and the rental vacancy rate was 10.9%.

Racial composition as of the 2020 census
Race	Number	Percent
White	12,949	90.2%
Black or African American	256	1.8%
American Indian and Alaska Native	17	0.1%
Asian	321	2.2%
Native Hawaiian and Other Pacific Islander	2	0.0%
Some other race	111	0.8%
Two or more races	694	4.8%
Hispanic or Latino (of any race)	246	1.7%

=== 2000 census ===
As of the census of 2000, there were 12,704 people, 4,789 households, and 3,749 families residing in the CDP. The population density was 1,730.0 people per square mile (668.3/km^{2}). There were 5,062 housing units at an average density of 689.3/sq mi (266.3/km^{2}). The racial makeup of the CDP was 96.39% White, 0.94% Black or African American, 0.11% Native American, 1.59% Asian, 0.02% Pacific Islander, 0.25% from other races, and 0.70% from two or more races. Hispanics or Latinos of any race were 0.77% of the population.

There were 4,789 households, out of which 39.6% had children under the age of 18 living with them, 67.3% were married couples living together, 9.0% had a female householder with no husband present, and 21.7% were non-families. 19.1% of all households were made up of individuals, and 7.6% had someone living alone who was 65 years of age or older. The average household size was 2.62 and the average family size was 3.00.

The age distribution was 27.2% under 18, 6.4% from 18 to 24, 29.8% from 25 to 44, 24.1% from 45 to 64, and 12.4% who were 65 or older. The median age was 38 years. For every 100 females, there were 92.0 males. For every 100 females age 18 and over, there were 87.6 males.

The median income for a household in Teays Valley was $53,053, and the median income for a family was $62,711. Males had a median income of $52,083 versus $27,036 for females. The per capita income for the CDP was $24,236. About 6.5% of families and 8.1% of the population were below the poverty line, including 9.6% of those under age 18 and 8.0% of those age 65 or over.

== Education ==
The Putnam County Schools operates public schools in the area. Teays Valley's students are split between the Hurricane attendance area (Hurricane High School, Hurricane Middle School, and West Teays Elementary School) and the Winfield attendance area (Winfield High School, Winfield Middle School, and Scott-Teays Elementary School).

A private K-12 school, Teays Valley Christian School, is also located in the community. The West Virginia International School (ウエストバージニア国際学校 Uesuto Bājinia Kokusai Gakkō), a Japanese weekend school, holds its classes at Scott Teays Elementary School in Scott Depot. The school office is in Building 6 of the West Virginia Department of Education facility in Charleston.

== Fire department ==
The Teays Valley area is primarily protected by the Teays Valley Fire Department. The department was founded in 1964 by the Scott/Teays Lions Club as an all volunteer department. In March 2013 the TVFD became a combination fire department consisting of 24/7 coverage by a paid staff supplemented by a group of dedicated volunteers.

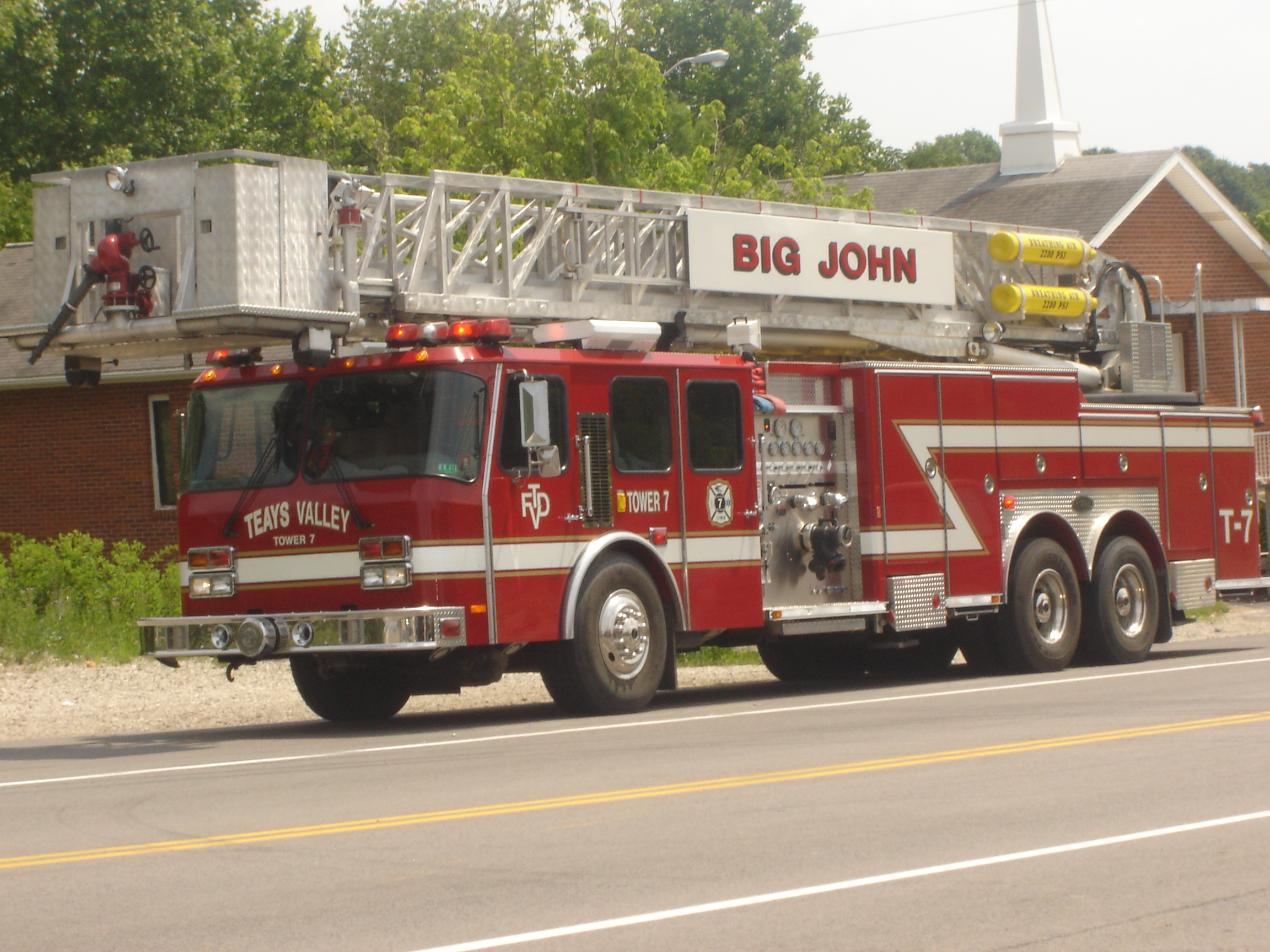
Truck 7

Engine 71 (Retired)

== Notable person ==
- Jack Whittaker, winner of the largest undivided lottery prize in history and the third-largest jackpot in U.S. history, lived in Teays Valley at the time of his win.
