= 2016 West Virginia flood =

2016 flood in West Virginia and Virginia, USA

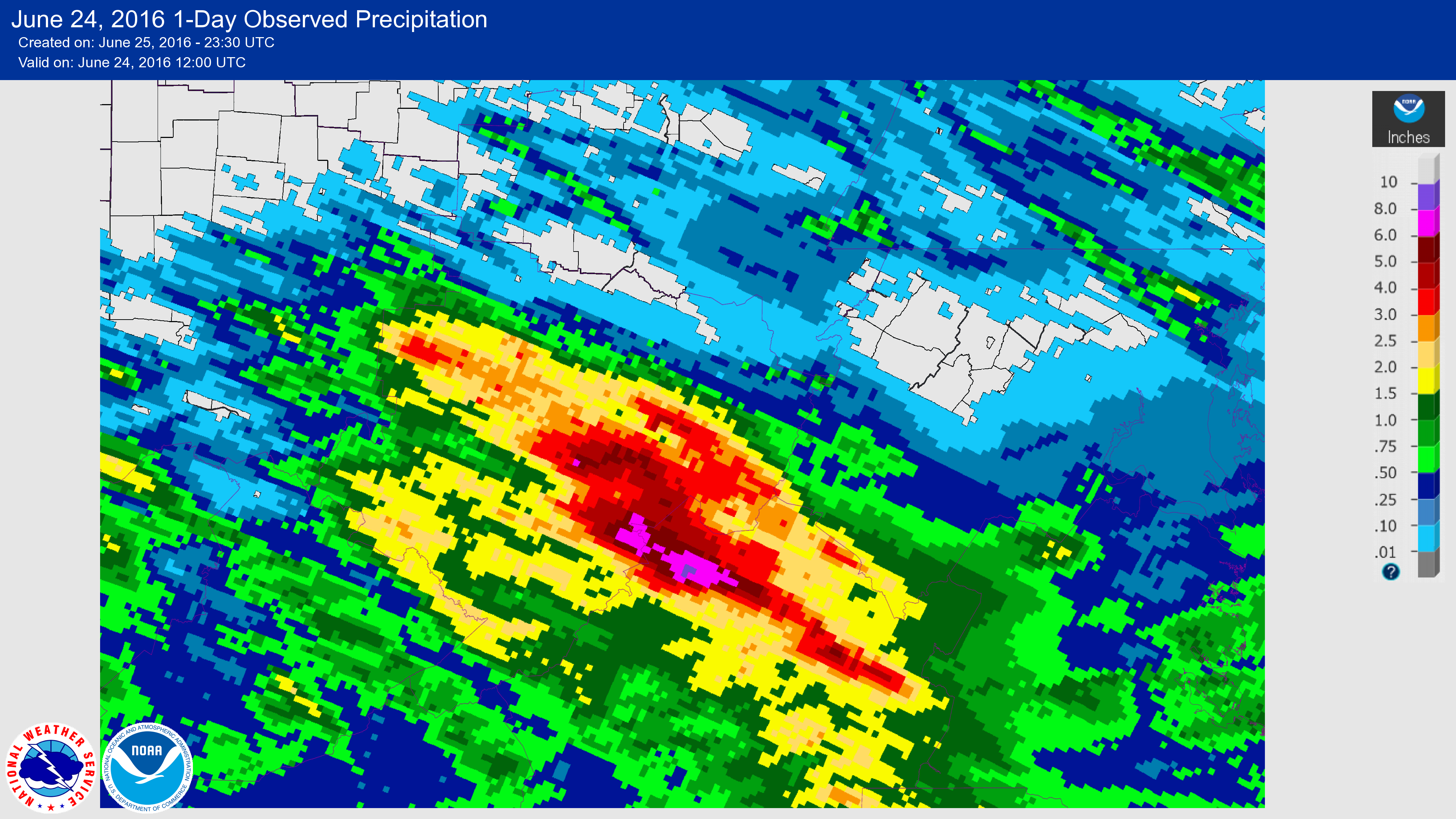
- Rainfall accumulations across West Virginia from 8:00 a.m. on June 23 to 8:00 a.m. on June 24 (12:00–12:00 UTC)
- Date: June 23–24, 2016
- Location: West Virginia and Virginia, United States
- Deaths: At least 23
- Property damage: $1.1 billion (2016 USD)

On June 23, 2016, a flood hit areas of the U.S. state of West Virginia and nearby parts of Virginia, resulting in 23 deaths. The flooding was the result of 8 to 10 inches (200 to 250 mm) of rain falling over a period of 12 hours, resulting in a flood that was among the deadliest in West Virginia history. It was also the deadliest flash flood event in the United States since the 2010 Tennessee floods until both were surpassed by the 2022 Appalachian floods.

== Flood event ==
On June 23, 2016, thunderstorms brought torrential rain to much of West Virginia, resulting in accumulations of up to 10 in (250 mm) in 12–24 hours. According to meteorologists at the National Weather Service, this rainfall qualifies as a 1,000 year event for parts of Kanawha, Fayette, Nicholas, Summers and Greenbrier counties. Rainfall totals included 9.37 in (238 mm) in Maxwelton and 7.53 in (191 mm) in Rainelle. Two-day accumulations in White Sulphur Springs reached 9.17 in (233 mm). In addition to the torrential rain, the storms produced an EF1 tornado near Kenna in Jackson County. The brief tornado lifted and rolled a single-wide trailer, injuring its two occupants; minor damage occurred elsewhere along its path.

The tremendous rainfall produced widespread and destructive flash floods in the state. The Elk River rose to an all-time high of 33.37 ft (10.17 m), surpassing the previous record of 32 ft (9.8 m) set in 1888. Greenbrier County was the hardest-hit, with at least 15 deaths confirmed. Greenbrier County Sheriff Jan Cahill described the county as "complete chaos". Flooding in White Sulphur Springs destroyed many homes and swept some clean off their foundations. One home was videotaped floating down Howard's Creek while engulfed in flames. The town of Rainelle was especially hard hit, and was described as looking like "a war zone".

Many people lost everything, and some people lost their lives.... We’re going to need some real help. This is our Katrina.

— Kanawha County Commission president Kent Carper

In Kanawha County, heavy rains washed out a bridge leading to a shopping center near Interstate 79 in Elkview, stranding approximately 500 people for nearly 24 hours. A 47-year-old woman drowned near Clendenin when rising waters from Wills Creek overcame her car. Despite numerous attempts, emergency responders were unable to reach her before her vehicle was swept away. Three other deaths took place near Clendenin, including a hospice patient who drowned after rescuers could not reach her home. At least six people died in Kanawha County.

A 4-year-old boy drowned in Ravenswood, Jackson County, after he was swept away by a swollen creek; the creek, normally only ankle-deep, had risen to 6 ft (1.8 m) due to the rain. An 8-year-old boy drowned in Big Wheeling Creek in Ohio County.

About 500 homes were severely damaged or destroyed in Roane County. In Clay County, the communities of Procious,Camp Creek and others were left in ruins.

At least 60 roads were shut down, many of them swept away. Multiple bridges across the state were destroyed. In Nicholas County, the Cherry River flooded much of Richwood, forcing the evacuation of a nursing home. Homes in low-lying areas of the county were flooded up to the roof. Electric utilities reported at one point that 500,000 customers were left without power from the floods.

Record-high and near-record-high waters were reported along the Greenbrier River at Hilldale (25.9 ft (7.9 m) over flood stage) and Ronceverte (23.3 ft (7.1 m) over flood stage), as well as along the New River at Thurmond (19.3 ft (5.9 m) over flood stage). Summersville Lake increased by 43.5 billion gallons between 8 a.m. June 23 and noon June 24.

On June 27, it was announced that two people on a camping trip in Greenbrier County, who were thought to have been swept away in a camper and presumed dead in the flooding, had been found alive.

== Aftermath ==
Flood deaths by county in West Virginia
County	Deaths	Ref.
Greenbrier	15	
Kanawha	6	
Jackson	1	
Ohio	1	
Total	23	

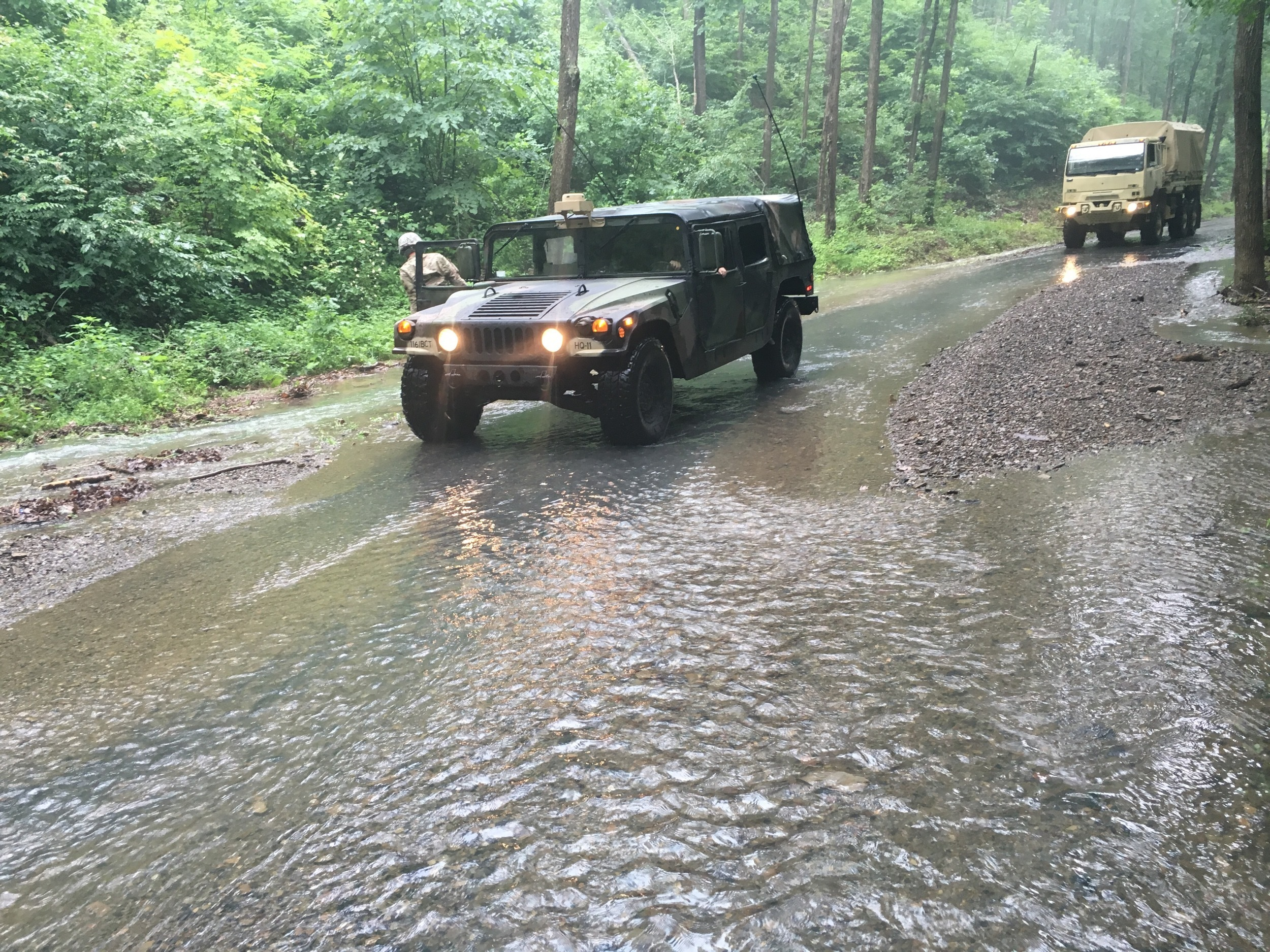
The 116th Infantry Brigade Combat Team of the Virginia National Guard was deployed following floods.

In the wake of the floods, West Virginia Governor Earl Ray Tomblin declared a state of emergency for 44 of the state's 55 counties. He also ordered the deployment of 400 members of the West Virginia National Guard. Search and rescue teams were deployed across the state to assist stranded residents. Numerous swift water and rooftop rescues were conducted. A volunteer firefighter and other residents of White Sulphur Springs used front-end loaders and other heavy machinery to move through debris-laden floodwaters during the overnight of June 23–24 to save 60 people. On June 25, President Barack Obama declared West Virginia a major disaster area, ordering aid to assist victims of the floods in Kanawha, Greenbrier and Nicholas counties. On June 28, Tomblin requested the disaster area be expanded to include Clay, Fayette, Monroe, Pocahontas, Roane, Summers and Webster counties. Five of those counties—Clay, Fayette, Monroe, Roane and Summers — were granted the request.

As a precautionary measure, natural gas service was suspended for White Sulphur Springs in Greenbrier County.

In Fayette County, where there were reports of looters, the sheriff warned would-be thieves that citizens were legally armed and ready to protect what they had left. Law enforcement officials in the county later clarified that such actions were "not sanctioned by the sheriff's department."

In unaffected parts of the state including Morgantown and Martinsburg, residents collected items to donate to the flood-ravaged areas.

The 2016 Greenbrier Classic golf tournament, scheduled to start on July 7, was canceled due to the floods. The Greenbrier Resort, where the tournament is played, was closed indefinitely, though available rooms were offered free-of-charge to flood victims in need of shelter. By June 28, about 200 people displaced by the flood were staying at the resort.

Flooding in Alleghany County, Virginia, prompted deployment of the Virginia National Guard.

=== Impact on resiliency and flood preparedness efforts ===
The National Weather Service has described the magnitude and intensity of the June 2016 rain as a "once in 1,000 years" event. Over 10 inches of rain fell, much of it within 12 to 18 hours. A 2018 report by FEMA on lessons learned suggests that this sort of rain event and flooding may occur more frequently than has previously been expected.

One scientist from West Virginia University who concurs with these conclusions has emphasized the importance of "honest conversations about climate change and what it means for West Virginia" in order to prepare for more intense precipitation events.

The West Virginia State Resiliency Office was created in response to the disaster. In January 2020, the office was described as "barely functioning," and rebuilding from the flood remained incomplete.

== See also ==
- Floods in the United States: 2001–present
- List of United States tornadoes in June 2016
- List of West Virginia tornadoes
