= Teays, West Virginia =

Teays
- Unincorporated community
- Location within the state of West Virginia Teays (the United States)
- Coordinates: 38°26′30″N 81°57′10″W
- Country: United States
- State: West Virginia
- County: Putnam
- Time zone: UTC-5 (Eastern (EST))
  - Summer (DST): UTC-4 (EDT)
- ZIP codes: 25569

Teays, written Seays until circa 1884, is an unincorporated community in Putnam County, West Virginia, United States. The town is centered on the former general store / post office on Teays Lane, which sits across from the site of the Teays railroad depot, which was demolished in the mid-1900s.

Teays is a namesake and part of the census-designated place of Teays Valley, which was in turn named for Thomas Teays, a hunter and trapper who once spent a considerable amount of time in the vicinity.

Geologist William G. Tight (1865–1910) named the preglacial Teays River after Teays, which lies in the "riverless" Teays Valley that once was the bottom of the river.

== Gallery ==
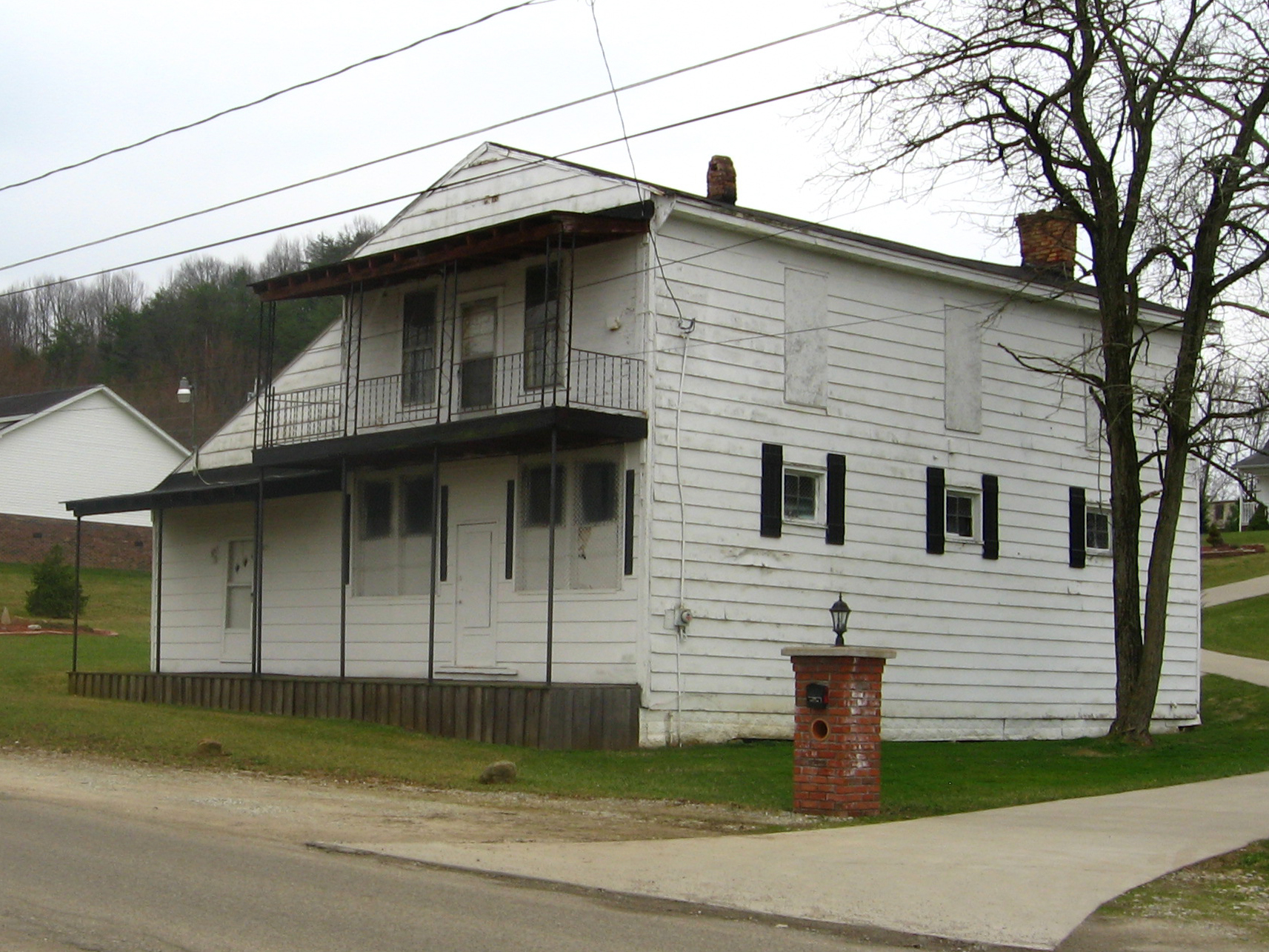
The former Teays, WV general store / post office.
