= Asbury House =

Historic house in West Virginia, United States

- U.S. National Register of Historic Places
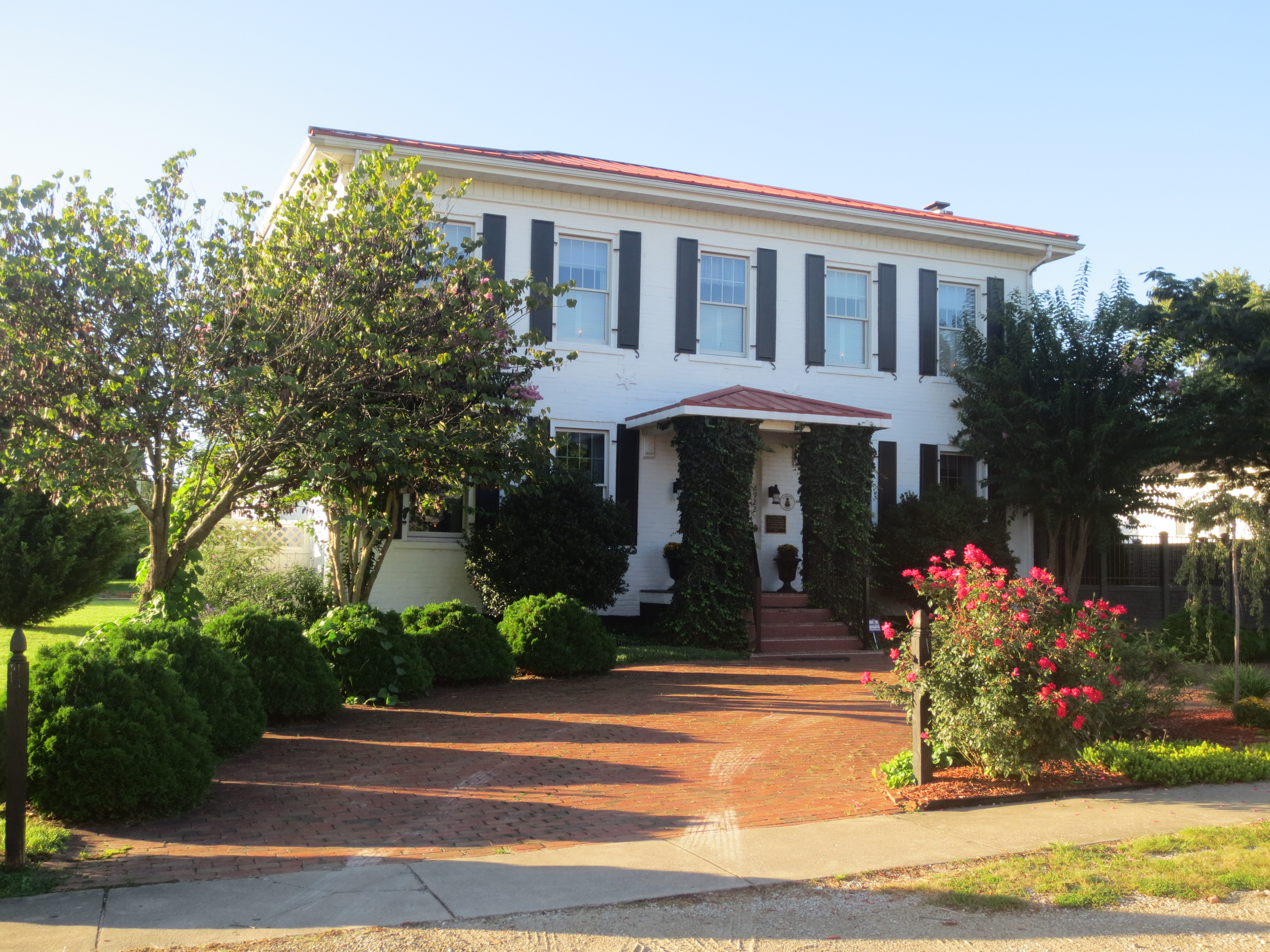

- Location within West Virginia Location within the United States
- Location: 2922 Putnam Ave., Hurricane, West Virginia
- Coordinates: 38°26′2″N 82°1′8″W
- Area: less than one acre
- Architect: MacFarland Connor, William McCallister
- Architectural style: I-house
- NRHP reference No.: 97000266
- Added to NRHP: March 21, 1997

Asbury House is a historic home located at Hurricane, Putnam County, West Virginia. It was built about 1876, and is a two-story brick dwelling in the Greek Revival / I house style. It features a reconstructed small front portico with metal hip roof and columns. In 1969, it was purchased as a parsonage by the Forrest Burdette United Methodist Church. It was moved to a new location in 1994.

It was listed on the National Register of Historic Places in 1997.
