= Confidence, West Virginia =

Unincorporated community in West Virginia, United States

Confidence
- Unincorporated community
- Location within the state of West Virginia Confidence (the United States)
- Coordinates: 38°34′21″N 81°49′43″W
- Country: United States
- State: West Virginia
- County: Putnam
- Time zone: UTC-5 (Eastern (EST))
  - Summer (DST): UTC-4 (EDT)
- GNIS feature ID: 1554182

Confidence is an unincorporated community in Putnam County West Virginia, United States, located on Route 34. The community is served by Confidence Elementary School. Confidence is a part of the Huntington-Ashland Metropolitan Statistical Area (MSA). As of the 2010 census, the MSA had a population of 287,702. New definitions from February 28, 2013 placed the population at 363,000.
