= Ross Booth Memorial Bridge =

- Winfield Toll Bridge
- U.S. National Register of Historic Places
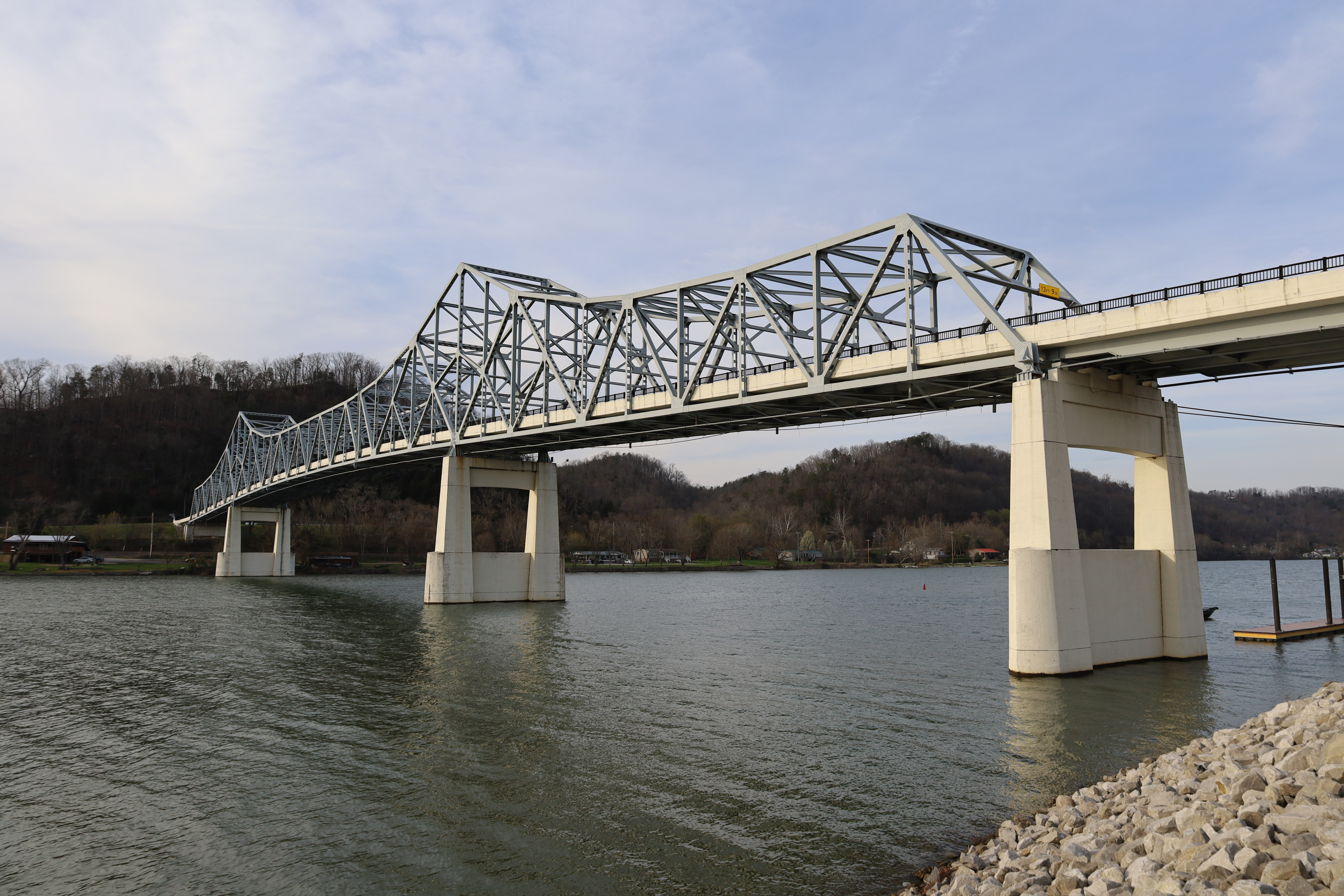
- The bridge in 2022

- Location within West Virginia Location within the United States
- Location: WV 34 mile 21.34, Winfield, West Virginia
- Coordinates: 38°32′04″N 81°53′53″W
- Area: less than one acre
- Built: 1955
- Built by: Harrington and Cortelyou, Inc.; John F. Beasley Construction Co.; Vincennes Steel Company
- NRHP reference No.: 11000931
- Added to NRHP: December 15, 2011

The Ross Booth Memorial Bridge, historically known as the Winfield Toll Bridge, is a historic three-span cantilever Warren Truss bridge located at Winfield and Red House, Putnam County, West Virginia. It was built in 1955, and spans the Kanawha River, carrying West Virginia Route 34. The cantilever through-truss consists of two anchor spans each 245 feet (75 m) in length and the main span 462 feet (141 m) in length between pier center lines. The main span consists of two 128-foot-4-inch (39.12 m) cantilever arms and a 205-foot-4-inch (62.59 m) suspended span.

The West Virginia Department of Highways renovated the bridge in 2010, replacing or repairing many components of the bridge, including replacing the deck and adding a sidewalk, while also taking care to preserve the historical aspects of the bridge. As a result of the refurbishment, the bridge was eligible to be added to the list of the National Register of Historic Places and was officially registered on December 15th, 2011.
