= Lake Monongahela =

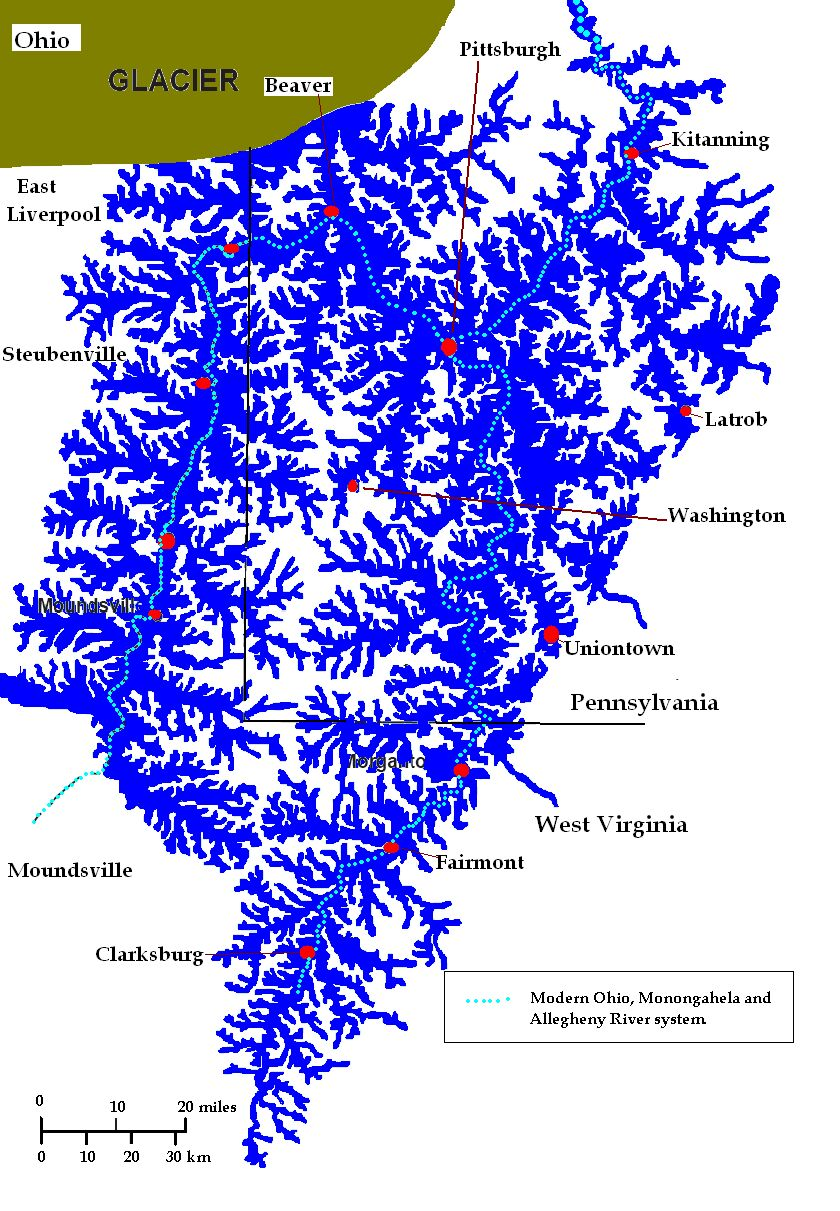
- Lake Monongahela during its most expansive period. Based on the map of John A. Harper; 1997.

- Location within Pennsylvania
- Location: Pennsylvania, Ohio & West Virginia
- Coordinates: 39.97°N 80°W
- Lake type: former lake
- Etymology: Monongahela River
- Primary inflows: Laurentide Ice Sheet
- Primary outflows: Ohio River
- Basin countries: United States
- First flooded: 900,000 years before present
- Max. length: 122 mi (196 km)
- Max. width: 365 mi (587 km); 212 mi (341 km)
- Residence time: 170,000 years in existence
- Surface elevation: c. 1,160 ft (354 m)
- References: Lake Monongahela: Anatomy of an Immense Ice Age Pond; John A. Harper; Bureau of Topographic and Geologic Survey; 1997.

Lake Monongahela was a proglacial lake in western Pennsylvania, West Virginia, and Ohio. It formed during the Pre-Illinoian ice epoch when the advance of the ice sheet southwards blocked the drainage of these valleys to the north. The lake formed south of the ice front continued to rise until it was able to breach a low divide near New Martinsville, West Virginia. The overflow was the beginning of the process which created the modern Ohio River valley.

== Preglacial drainage ==
The Monongahela flowed north from Lewis County to Pittsburgh. Here, the Lower Allegheny joined and they continued westward in the Ohio River valley to Beaver, Pennsylvania. At Beaver, the predecessor of the upper Ohio River joined and together the water flowed northwest, up the Beaver River into Ohio. Using a combination of waterways it crossed the divide into the Lake Erie basin to join the ancestral St. Lawrence River through Canada.

- The “Upper Allegheny” River began in McKean County, south of Bradford flowing north into New York. Possibly following Conawango Creek to the Lake Erie basin to join the ancestral St. Lawrence River through Canada.
- The “Middle Allegheny” River began in Warren County, east of Warren. Following the modern Allegheny River valley, south to Franklin, Venango County it turned to the northwest into the valley of French Creek. Crossing the divide outside of Erie into the Lake Erie Basin, where it joins ancestral St. Lawrence River through Canada.
- The “Lower Allegheny” River originated in the Clarion River valleys in Elk, Forest, and Jefferson Counties. Following the Clarion River, it flowed southward to join the Monongahela River at Pittsburgh.
- The “Ohio River” was a tributary of the Monongahela River, joining the Monongahela at Beaver.

The preglacial Monongahela River drained three fourths of combined drainage of the modern Ohio, Monongahela, and Allegheny Rivers.

== Lake Monongahela ==
Around 900,000 years before present (YBP) the Laurentide Ice Sheet reached southward into western Pennsylvania, blocking the preexisting drainage that flowed northward. The ice dammed these rivers, creating large lakes, forcing the water to find a new drainage pattern, which exists to the present. On the upper Ohio, Monongahela and the Allegheny Rivers this impounded water has become known as Lake Monongahela. The ancestral Monongahela River, referred to as the Pittsburgh River, had flowed northwards from West Virginia, past Pittsburgh, into the Lake Erie basin and out the St. Lawrence River to the ocean. The lake began when the ice dammed the valley near Pittsburgh. The lake changed sizes as the ice front moved and as the volume of water changed. At its largest, it rose to 1,100 feet (340 m) above sea level. Eventually the water found a low divide near New Martinsville, West Virginia, creating an outlet to the south and west into the Teays River. Thus, the upper Ohio network of river valleys came into form.

Once Lake Monongahela formed, the water drowned the existing landforms. The lake did not erode the topography—it simply covered the land with water and lacustrine sediment. The sediment settled on both topographic highs and lows beneath the surface of the lake. Drowned terraces and abandoned meander channels, as well as low hills, slopes, and valley bottoms, received this covering of sediment. As such, sediments found on different terraces can actually be the same age. Marine (1997) found five terrace levels along the rivers, but he had to conclude that the lake deposits found on them resulted from only two episodes of glacial damming. Deposits on the fifth and fourth terrace levels represent damming during a pre-Illinoian glaciation, whereas the third- and second-terrace-level deposits represent damming during Illinoian glaciation. The first terrace (the modern floodplain) consists simply of Wisconsinan outwash and Holocene alluvial deposits, which fill river valleys that had been cut to bedrock by the end of Illinoian time.

I. C. White, the first director of the West Virginia Geological Survey, named this body of water Lake Monongahela (White, 1896). It resembled a man-made lake more than a natural lake. The river system was blocked and the water backed into all the side valleys. This happened at least twice. Each lake left evidence at a different elevation (White, 1896; Leverett, 1934) throughout the valley. As the water rose, it reached the divides of the side valley, until it finally escaped over the divide of the ancestral Ohio River, carving the notch lower. Once flowing over the divide, the water followed the front of the ice sheet, creating the Ohio River. The three Allegheny Rivers shown above merged into one, which joined the Monongahela at Pittsburgh. The newly combined waters moved down the Ohio and then up the ancestral tributary of the Ohio until it flowed over the divide at New Martinsville. The Ohio replaced the Monongahela as the dominant stream.

== Terraces ==
The lake's age has been determined by the lake sediments and terrace deposits. The sediments reveal a change in the magnetic polarity during the life of the lake, with the oldest deposits being between 730,000 and 900,000 years ago. Other terrace deposits show later periods of ponding. Pollen from a pine-spruce forest dominate the oldest sediments. This reflects a climate which would have been created by the proximity of the ice sheet. Younger sediments contain pollen and plant fossils of a hemlock-hardwoods association, reflecting the moderating climate as the ice sheets retreated northward.

White (1896) and Marine (1997) described five terraces that occur along or near the valley walls of the Ohio, Monongahela, and Allegheny Rivers and their major tributaries in Pennsylvania and West Virginia. These relatively flat landforms contain soils composed of highly weathered deposits of clay, silt, sand, and gravel distributed at elevations as high as 300 feet (91 m) above present stream levels. These sediments are lacustrine, or lake-derived, deposition. Campbell (1902) named the Carmichaels Formation are lacustrine sediments exposed at Carmichaels in Greene County, Pa. These deposits are found throughout southwestern Pennsylvania and northern West Virginia. They typically contain reddish-orange to tan clays, silts, and sands. They can contain cobbles and boulders from the local bedrock (Donahue and Kirchner, 1998). The clays are of high quality and were the source for the early pottery industry in the Pittsburgh area. Carmichaels Formation deposits occur on the upper two terrace levels in all the river valleys or on the lower terraces in the Monongahela Valley and in the valleys of the eastern tributaries of the Allegheny River. The other outwash deposits on the Allegheny, Ohio, and Beaver River terraces have no names. These deposits are typically red rust-colored, deeply weathered gravels composed of small, rounded pebbles generally less than 1 inch (2.5 cm) in diameter. Up to 10% of the pebbles are granites and other crystalline rocks. Some are cemented to form sandstones and other conglomerates. Others are loose assortments of silt, sand, and gravel. These outwash deposits occur on several terrace levels.

== See also ==
- Lake Tight
