= Demens =

Demens may refer to:

== People ==
- Kenny Demens (born 1990), American gridiron football player
- Peter Demens (born Pyotr Alexeyevitch Dementyev, 1850–1919), Russian-born co-founder of St. Petersburg, Florida, U.S.

== Other uses ==
- Anomologa demens, a species of moth found in South Africa
- Demens-Rumbough-Crawley House, a historic home in Asheville, North Carolina, U.S.

== See also ==
- Demers (disambiguation)
