= Teays River =

Pre-glacial river in North America

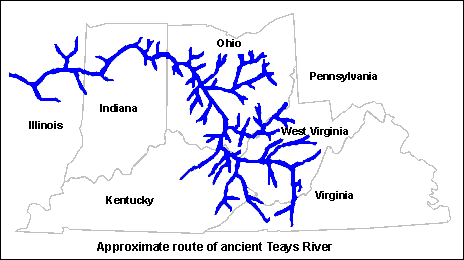
The Teays River network, which existed before disruption by glaciers during the Pleistocene. Reconstruction is based on the discovery of large buried valleys in West Virginia, Ohio, and Indiana and other evidence.

The Teays River /ˈteɪz/ (pronounced taze) was a major preglacial river that drained much of the present Ohio River watershed, but took a more northerly downstream course. Traces of the Teays across northern Ohio and Indiana are represented by a network of river valleys. The largest still existing contributor to the former Teays River is the Kanawha River in West Virginia, which is itself an extension of the New River. The name Teays, from the much smaller Teays Valley still extant above the surface, has been associated with the river and the remainder of its related buried valley since 1910. The more appropriate name would be the Ancestral Kanawha Valley. The term Teays is used when discussing the buried portion of the ancestral Kanawha River. The Teays was comparable in size to the Ohio River. The river's headwaters were near Blowing Rock, North Carolina; it then flowed through Virginia, West Virginia, Ohio, Indiana, and Illinois. (Hansen, 1995). The largest tributary to the Teays River was the Old Kentucky River (Teller 1991), which extended from southern Kentucky through Frankfort and subsequently flowed northeast, meeting other tributaries and eventually joining the Teays. Its mouth was probably coincident with the Mississippi Embayment.

== Creation ==
Scattered glacial erratics in northeastern Kentucky and southern Ohio are pre-Kansan glaciation in age. Only the Nebraskan glaciation is recognized as earlier than the Kansan; these have been designated as remnants of deposits left by the Nebraskan glacier. The ice sheet overrode the preglacial Teays creating ponds or glacial lakes. The back-up of water diverted the upper basin over the surrounding divides into the preglacial Ohio River. Thus the deep stage more likely is post-Nebraskan and pre-Kansan in age rather than preglacial. With the withdrawal of the Nebraskan glacier, which caused integration of the upper Kanawha (Teays) with the preglacial Ohio, a vastly shortened, unnamed descendant of the Teays apparently headed somewhere in west-central Ohio and cut the deep stage across Ohio, Indiana, and Illinois during the long Aftonian interglacial stage, which followed.

If the sequence of bedrock formations of northern Indiana were exposed, the extensive cliffs along the deep stage of the Teays and its tributaries would provide a clearer understanding of the stratigraphy of the area. The entire Silurian section below the Liston Creek limestone and a few feet of the upper Ordovician probably would be visible in the vicinity of La Fontaine. In Wabash County the part of the Teays Valley above the deep stage consists of broad terraces at an altitude of about 600 feet (180 m). From this terrace level the bedrock rises gradually to 700 feet (210 m) on the Lexington pene-plain surface. These terraces probably correspond in age to an erosional surface in the unglaciated areas known as the Parker strath, which was the result an erosion cycle that ended before the Kansan phase of the pre-Illinoian glaciation. More recent correlation places its age as pre-Nebraskan. The Parker strath probably represents an erosional level existent at the beginning of the Pleistocene before the rejuvenation associated with, and following, the Nebraskan glaciation. The general appearance and width of the strath terrace along the Teays Valley in Indiana indicates that it represents only a slight rejuvenation following the Lexington cycle.

In Virginia and West Virginia, the Teays River flowed in the valleys of the modern New River and Kanawha River (Hansen, 1995). The river then flowed west to Scioto County, Ohio, and to Ross County, Ohio, near Chillicothe. The valley then disappears under glacial sediments but can be tracked using water well yields and other means (Hansen, 1995). A total of seven tills have been identified within the Teays River Valley (Andrews, 2004). In portions of Ohio, the buried valley is up to 2 miles (3.2 km) wide and lies beneath 500 feet (150 m) of glacial sediments (Hansen, 1995).

== Course ==
The Teays River was a north- and northwest-flowing river existing before the Pleistocene Ice Ages – before 2.5 million years ago. The river flowed through southwest West Virginia, between Kentucky and Ohio, and northwest across Ohio (see illustration). The Teays then flowed under what is present-day Lafayette, Indiana, and just north of Champaign, Illinois, and likely was coincident with the lower present-day Illinois River.

The Teays River was dissected and largely wiped away by advancing glaciers and their meltwater. These glaciers were the massive continental ice sheets that began to cover large parts of Ohio and other states downstream (west) of Ohio between 2.5 and 3 million years ago. Their presence caused lakes (such as Lake Tight and Lake Monongahela) to form along the Teays and associated rivers. Overflow of these lakes into nearby, lower valleys caused large floods and new rivers to form. These new rivers – formed about 2 million years ago – included the present-day Ohio and Scioto Rivers, which are associated with the most direct evidence of the Teays.

=== West Virginia ===
The Teays River was the main stream of a preglacial river system. Its headwaters was near the eastern escarpment of the Blue Ridge, at the edge of the Piedmont Plateau in North Carolina and Virginia. The New River, the southernmost headwater of the Teays River, arises in Watauga County, North Carolina, in the Blue Ridge. This area is northeast of Asheville. It flows northeasterly direction for some distance and after making a right-angled bend, it trends northward until it makes a 90° turn to the west and joins the Gauley River. Here, it takes a new name as the Kanawha River. This continues to the northwest to Charleston. As New River, it was joined by the Greenbrier and Bluestone rivers. At Charleston, the Kanawha is joined by the Elk River. In its course, the Teays River cut across the folded Appalachians. The valley varies in width, from 0.75 to 1.25 miles (1.21 to 2.01 km), an average of 1 mile (1.6 km). A mile-wide valley can be observed without a stream 30 miles (48 km) from St. Albans to Huntington. No doubt, a large stream once occupied this abandoned valley. Approaching Huntington, the Guyandotte River joins the general path of the ancient river beginning at Barboursville and follows it north until the former river veers west over the south hills of Huntington and joins the Ohio River Valley heading west towards Kentucky. The Ohio River follows the Teays path until leaving the Ohio River in the north end of Catlettsburg where it veers away just south of Ashland to Wheelersburg. The Ohio River has a floor of the original valley as shown by the silted flats south of Ashland and the terraces between Franklin Furnace and Wheelersburg. At Wheelersburg, the Teays River flowed northward past Minford, Stockdale and Beaver, to Waverly, through a high-level, broad, well-defined open valley.

=== Ohio ===
The Teays system in Ohio is known as the Parker Strath. The Teays River extended across Ohio in a northwesterly direction from Huntington, West Virginia. It splits away from the Ohio River near Sciotodale and Wheelersburg and goes north and west through Minford, Stockdale, and Beaver before merging with the Scioto River valley near Waverly and Piketon. This is clearly visible on aerial and satellite imagery. However, its floor exists as broad upland flats, near Omega and Higby. The Scioto River has eroded and partially destroyed the Teays Valley from Waverly to Richmond Dale. It then continues northward to Chillicothe, where it disappears under a layering of Wisconsin glacial drift. Surveying under the drift has revealed that it continues to the border of Indiana, near Grand Lake St. Marys. From Chillicothe, the Teays Valley can be traced in a northwesterly direction past Andersonville, crossing the southwestern part of Pickaway County, past Atlanta. From there, it crosses the northeast corner of Fayette County near Pancoastburg (former Waterloo), extending in a northwesterly direction past London in Madison County, to South Vienna in Clark County. Here the Teays was joined by the Groveport River, which drained central Ohio. From South Vienna, the Teays River continues in a westerly direction, to a point near Springfield, in Clark County, and thence northwestward past Boulusville and St. Paris in Champaign County, and Sidney, Anna and Botkins, in Shelby County, to the southeastern part of Washington Township in Auglaize County, where it was joined from the north by a tributary, Wapakoneta Creek. The Teays continued its course westward past the village of Mercer to Rockford. Continuing west to the Ohio-Indiana state line in Mercer County.

=== Indiana ===
The Teays Valley enters Indiana in Jay County and trends west. It turns to the northwest 3 miles (4.8 km) west of La Fontaine crossing Miami County south of the Wabash River. Reaching under Tippecanoe County, it continues west through southern Benton County and into Illinois (Fidlar, 1948, pp. 12–15).

=== Illinois ===
In Illinois, the valley is called the Mahomet (Horberg, 1945, pp. 349–350). It trends westerly across the state, into the bedrock valley of the Illinois River.

== Entrenched or deep stage ==
The deep stage is used to describe the portion of the Teays Valley and other proglacial valleys carved into bedrock in the Great Lakes region. This includes the Ohio Valley, near Madison, Indiana, before the Pleistocene; the Wabash Valley; and the Mississippi Valley. The floor of the Teays Valley in West Virginia is 200 feet (61 m) above the entrenched Kanawha and Ohio Valley floors, and its bedrock floor is at least 15 feet (4.6 m) above them. The deep stage apparently was cut mainly after the diversion of the upper Kanawha (Teays) drainage to the Ohio River (Stout, Ver Steeg, and Lamb, 1943, pp. 78–79). The lowest bedrock altitude obtained along the course of the Teays Valley across Wabash County was 410 feet (120 m) above sea level in the vicinity of La Fontaine. The average gradient of the Mahomet Valley above Beardstown, Illinois, is about 7 inches per mile (11.1 cm per kilometer). The altitude of the valley floor where it occurs beneath the present floodplain of the Wabash River should be about 410 feet (120 m). The profile of the Teays is a gorge-like valley entrenched within a broad, older valley. Steep walls 200 feet (61 m) high can be recognized along the buried trench. The inner valley has been called the deep stage and is interglacial in age.

== Tributaries ==
=== Ohio valleys ===
In the unglaciated area of southern Ohio, tributaries reflect the adjacent hills, which are considerably reduced: low gradients, broad valleys for the size of the modern streams, and dendritic patterns, all features of maturity. The largest of the tributaries in Ohio are the Marietta River, Hamden Creek, Albany River, Barlow Creek, Portsmouth River, Logan River, Bremen Creek, Putnam Creek, Cambridge River, Groveport River, Mechanicsburg Creek, and Wapakoneta Creek. The Cincinnati River flows northeastward from the southwest corner of Ohio to Dayton, to join the Teays River. At the time a divide existed between the preglacial Teays and the Miami watershed. Well records do not indicate a broad depression, which widens northward and is of sufficient size to have accommodated so large a stream as the Cincinnati River.

=== Preglacial Eel valley ===
The Eel Valley in Wabash County, Indiana, follows a preglacial tributary of the Teays (Horberg, 1945, p. 357). It too has a deep stage. At its junction with the Teays Valley it is just under 400 feet (120 m) above sea level. The tributary does not rise above 500 feet (150 m) through its length in Wabash County.

=== Illinois valleys ===
A tributary from the north enters the Mahomet Valley near Paxton, and important tributaries from the south, north of Danville, and in western Logan and Menard counties.

== Demise ==
The Kanawha (Teays) was forced across a major divide when the return of the Laurentian ice sheet dammed the northward flow of the river. The diversion occurred during the Nebraskan or older pre-Illinoian glaciation. This is based on an analysis of the drift found in the valley from the Kansan or late pre-Illinoian age.

== Present-day remnants ==
Visual remains of the Teays River today include large valleys containing only small streams (such as the mile-wide valley from Huntington to St. Albans in West Virginia and the valley extending north from Wheelersburg in Ohio). These valleys can be seen on aerial and satellite images. However, short segments of some such valleys are still occupied by the Ohio and Scioto Rivers. The Scioto flows through the valley in the opposite direction (south) to that taken by the Teays (north).

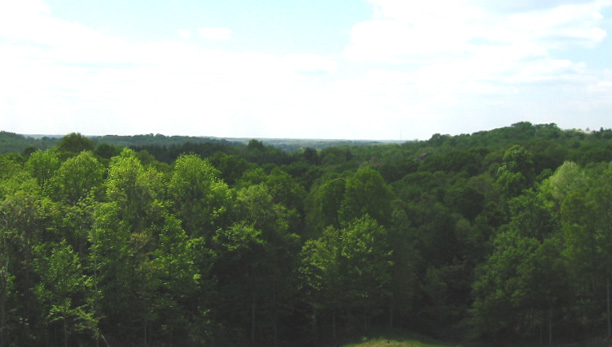
Appalachian Plateau near Athens in southeast Ohio. The plateau was characterized by low, rolling hills and slow-moving rivers until glaciers disturbed regional streams. The distant ridge is actually a flat upland surface beneath Albany. A shallow paleovalley, now filled with proglacial lake sediments, underlies the flat surface. The paleovalley once fed the Teays River and contains river and lake sediments. The valley was abandoned after the Ohio River was formed and surrounding streams cut downward, increasing their valley depths.

The Teays River was dissected and largely wiped away by advancing glaciers and their meltwater. These glaciers were the massive continental ice sheets that began to cover large parts of Ohio and other states downstream (west) of Ohio between 2.5 and 3 million years ago. Their presence caused lakes such as Lake Tight and Lake Monongahela to form along the Teays and associated rivers. Overflow of these lakes into nearby, lower valleys caused large floods and new rivers to form. These new rivers – formed about 2 million years ago – included the present-day Ohio and Scioto Rivers, which are associated with the most direct evidence of the Teays.

The present Ohio-Mississippi river system contains some distinctive relict fish populations descended from Jurassic Period fishes of the Teays, such as the primitive bowfin (Amia calva) and various gars (Lepisosteus spp).

== Discovery ==
The Teays River was discovered and named for the village of Teays, West Virginia, by geologist William G. Tight (1865–1910). The small community of Teays is in the riverless Teays Valley that used to be the bottom of the Teays River.

In 1886, geologist Gerard Fowke recognized that the gorge west of Chillicothe, Ohio, was larger than Paint Creek would have created. He claimed that a large river would have had to exist to create the wide and deep valley. Conventional geologists did not support his claim. In 1903 William G. Tight, a professor at Denison University in Granville, Ohio, saw the same type of valley and small stream running from Charleston to the Ohio River. It had only a minor water course beyond St. Albans, West Virginia. Here, the Kanawha River turns north. Professor Tight sought in vain to persuade the geological community that this valley once carried a mighty river that continued across Ohio, Indiana, and Illinois through a valley now deeply buried under glacial deposits. He called it the Teays River, for a village in West Virginia.

== Namesakes ==
Teays Valley, West Virginia, and Ashville, Ohio's Teays Valley Local School District are named after the former river.

== See also ==
- Lake Tight
- Lake Monongahela
