= West Virginia Route 34 =

State highway in West Virginia, United States

West Virginia Route 34
- WV 34 highlighted in red

Route information
- Maintained by WVDOH
- Length: 51.0 mi (82.1 km)

Major junctions
- South end: WV 3 near Hamlin
- US 60 near Hurricane; I-64 near Hurricane; US 35 from Scott Depot to Winfield; WV 817 near Winfield
- North end: I-77 in Kenna

Location
- Country: United States
- State: West Virginia
- Counties: Lincoln, Putnam, Kanawha, Jackson

Highway system
- West Virginia State Highway System; Interstate; US; State
← US 33	→ US 35

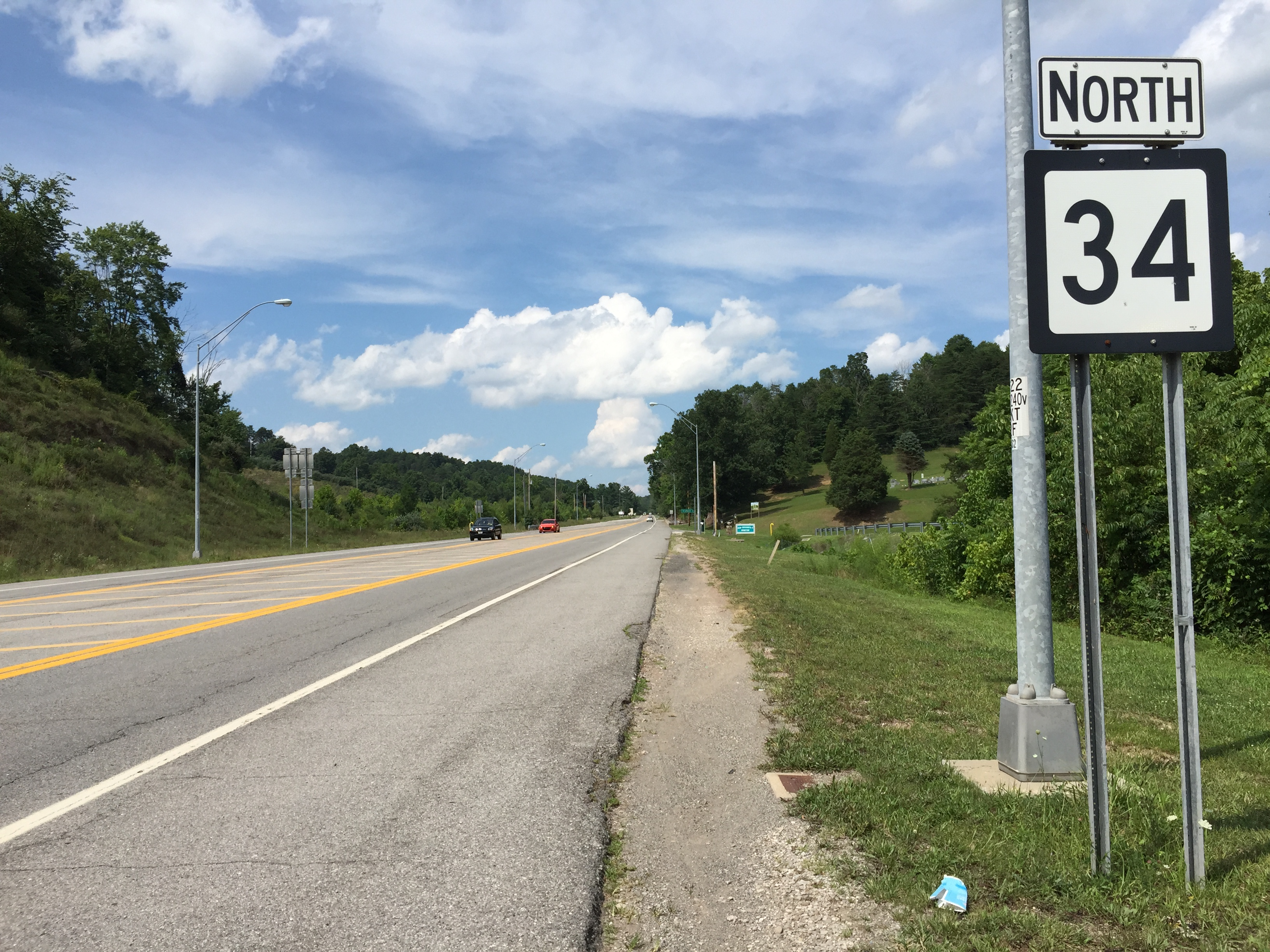
View north along WV 34 at US 35 in Putnam County

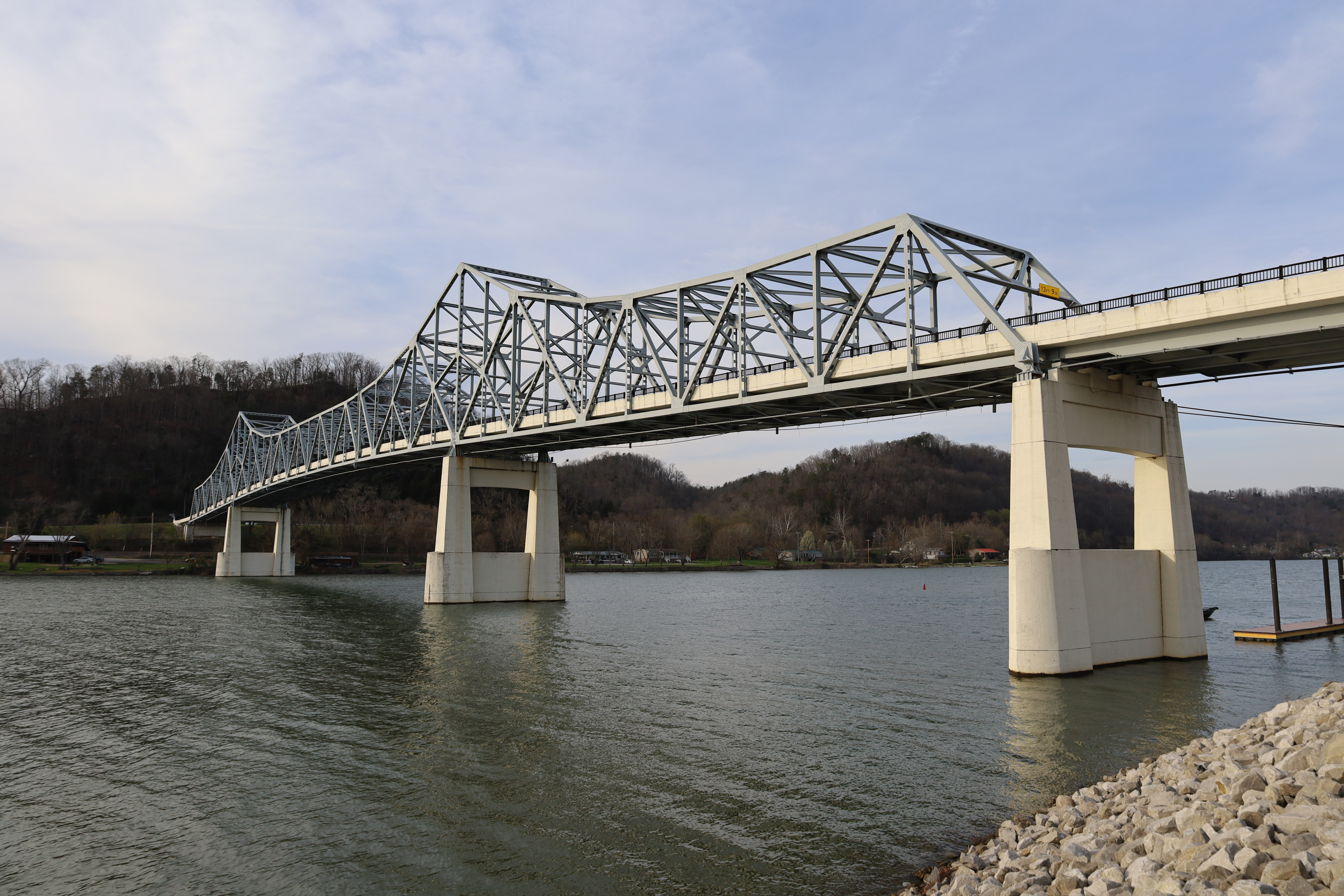
WV 34 crosses the Kanawha River over the Ross Booth Memorial Bridge in Winfield, West Virginia.

West Virginia Route 34 is a north–south state highway in the U.S. state of West Virginia. The southern terminus of the route is at West Virginia Route 3 three miles (5 km) east of Hamlin. The northern terminus is at Interstate 77 exit 124 in Kenna.

The portion of the highway between Scott Depot and Hurricane has seen heavy commercial and residential development since the 1980s. The area, known as Teays Valley, has grown into a major suburb of Charleston, the state's capital.

== Major intersections ==
County	Location	mi	km	Destinations	Notes
Lincoln				WV 3 – Hamlin	
Putnam	Hurricane			US 60 east – St. Albans	south end of US 60 overlap
Putnam	Hurricane			US 60 west – Milton	north end of US 60 overlap
Putnam	Hurricane			WV 34 Alt. south – Hurricane	
Putnam	Teays Valley			I-64 – Huntington, Charleston	I-64 exit 39
Putnam				US 35 to I-64 – Point Pleasant, Charleston	interchange
Putnam				WV 817 north to US 35 north – Point Pleasant	south end of WV 817 overlap
Putnam	Winfield			WV 817 south – Charleston	interchange; north end of WV 817 overlap
Putnam	Winfield			Winfield Toll Bridge over Kanawha River	
Putnam				WV 62 north – Point Pleasant, Eleanor	interchange; south end of WV 62 overlap
Putnam	Red House			WV 62 south – Charleston, Poca	north end of WV 62 overlap
Jackson				CR 21 south	south end of CR 21 overlap; former US 21 south
Jackson	Kenna			CR 21 north	north end of CR 21 overlap; former US 21 north
Jackson				I-77 – Parkersburg, Charleston	I-77 exit 124
1.000 mi = 1.609 km; 1.000 km = 0.621 mi: Concurrency terminus

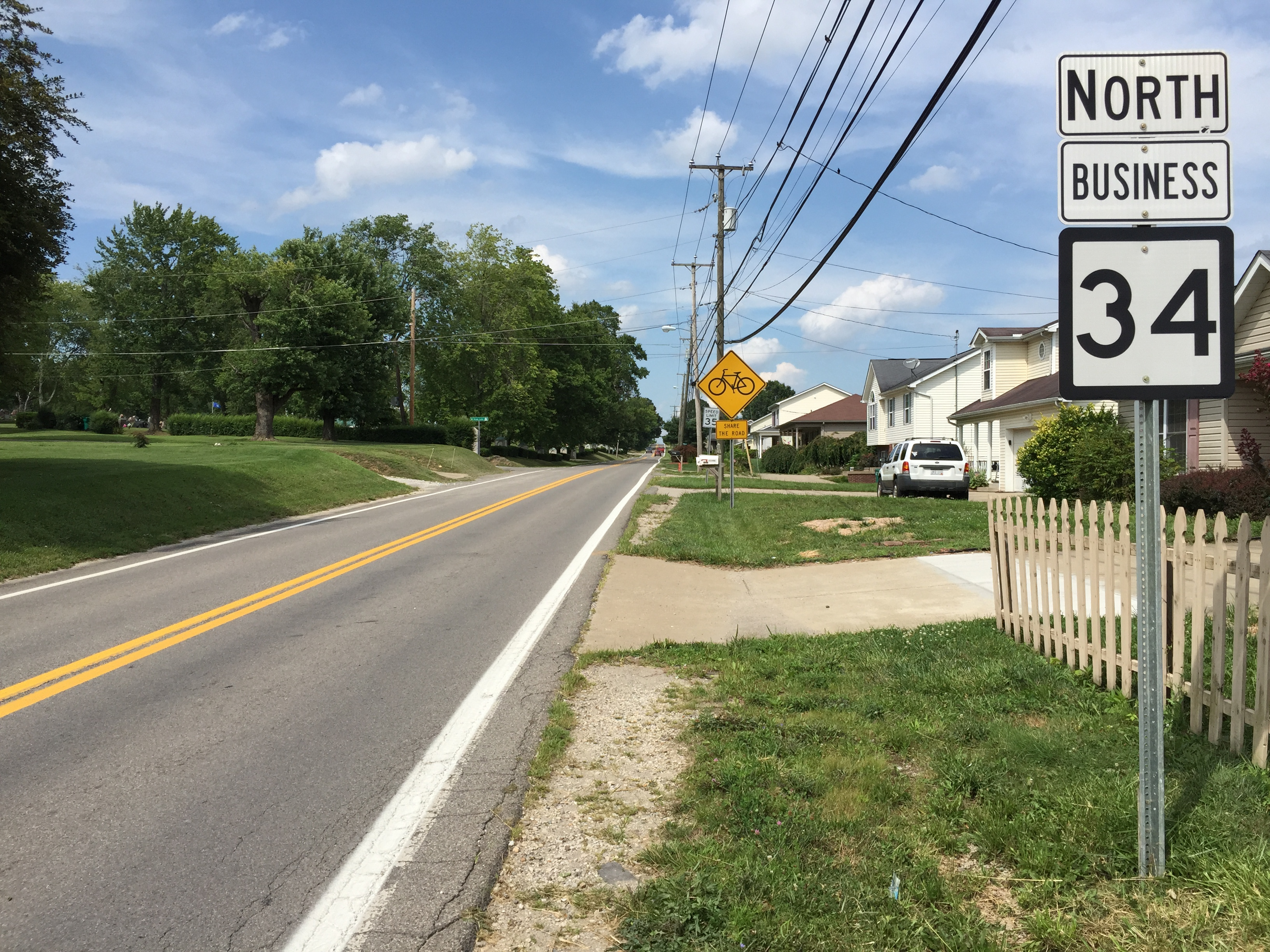
WV 34 Bus. northbound in Hurricane

== West Virginia Route 34 Business ==
WV 34 Bus is a business loop through downtown Hurricane. It follows Main Street from US 60 southwest of Hurricane northeastward to WV 34 just east of downtown Hurricane. Along WV 34 and US 60, it is signed as WV 34 Alternate, but along the route itself, it is signed as WV 34 Business.
