= Lake Tight =

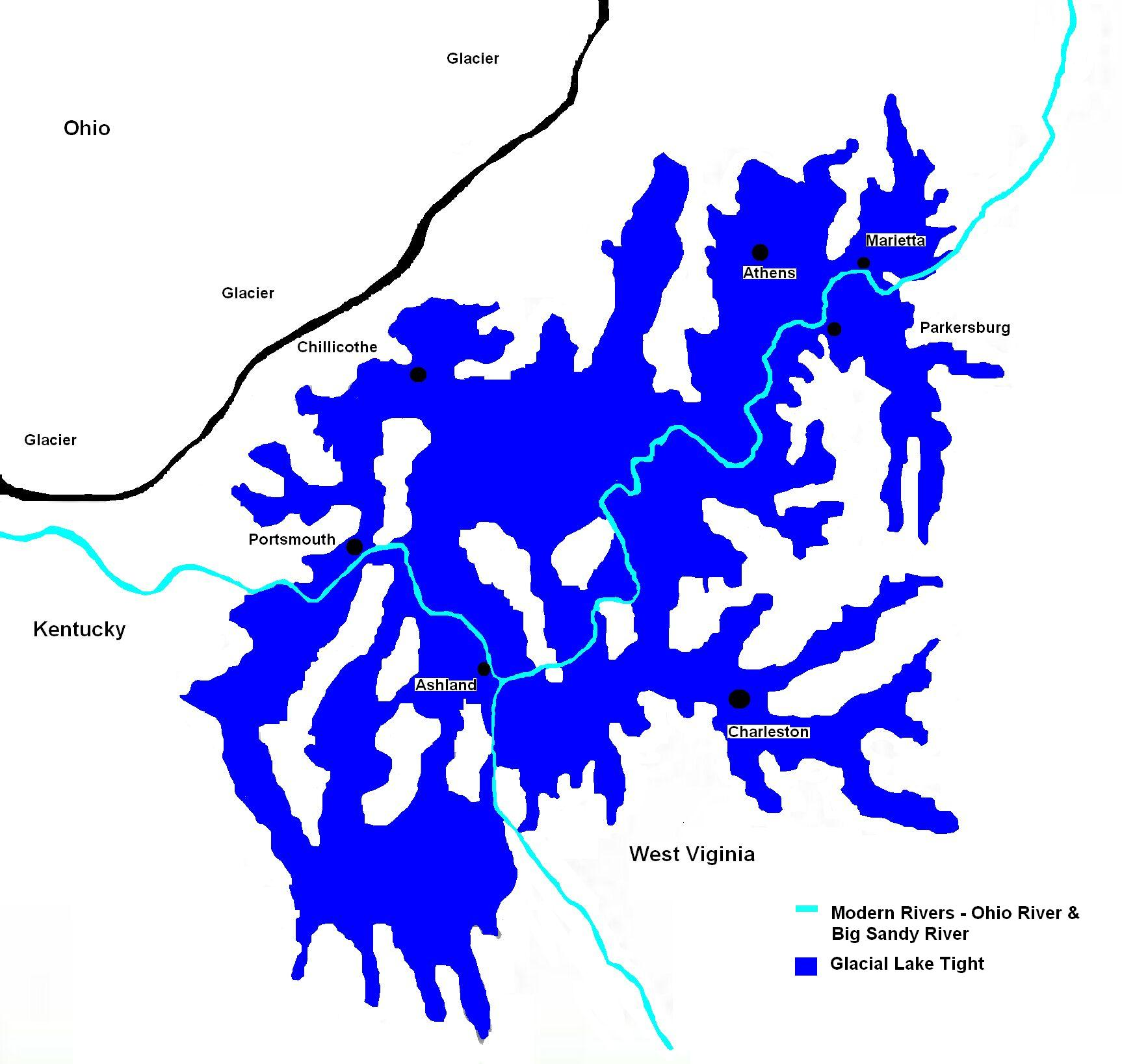
- Extent of Glacial Lake Tight about 500,000 YBP (years before present)

- Location within Ohio
- Location: Ohio & West Virginia
- Coordinates: 38.8°N 82.21°W
- Lake type: former lake
- Etymology: William G. Tight
- Primary inflows: Laurentide Ice Sheet
- Primary outflows: Ohio River
- Basin countries: United States
- First flooded: 2,000,000 years before present
- Max. length: c. 85 mi (137 km)
- Max. width: c. 90 mi (140 km) – 212 mi (341 km)
- Surface area: 9,920 sq mi (25,700 km^{2})
- Average depth: 340 ft (100 m)
- Max. depth: 400 ft (120 m)
- Residence time: 170,000 years in existence
- Surface elevation: c. 1,160 ft (354 m)
- References: Goldthwaite, R. P., "The Teays Valley Problem, a Historical Perspective", pp. 3-8 in Wilton N. Melhorn, 1991, Geology and Hydrogeology of the Teays-Mahomet Bedrock Valley Systems, Geological Society of America Special Paper.

Lake Tight, named for geologist William G. Tight, was a glacial lake in what is present-day Ohio, Kentucky, and West Virginia, during the Ice Age the early Pleistocene before 700,000 years.

== History ==
Lake Tight's origins date to nearly 2 million years before the modern era. As the onset of the ice age began, glaciers spread down south causing large scale deformation of features like the Teays River.

The Teays had been a river for several million years, flowing north out of the Appalachian Mountains in what is now North Carolina. The river's path traveled through modern-day West Virginia, Kentucky, Ohio, Indiana, and Illinois, finally emptying into the Gulf of Mexico, which at the time extended to southern Illinois. The glaciers of the Ice Age soon began to block the Teays, effectively damming the river and forming Lake Tight, near what is now Chillicothe, Ohio.

The lake has been the repeated topic of research over the past 100 plus years. The lakes existence was short; the lake appears to have formed in the Lower or Middle Pleistocene, around 700,000 years before present. At its greatest size, the lake was approximately 900 feet (270 m) deep, and 7,000 square miles (18,000 km^{2}) in size (nearly two-thirds the size of Lake Erie). When the lake finally overflowed, it created new drainage channels and rivers flowing south, in the opposite direction of the Teays River.

A study in 2014 using Geographic Information System (GIS) Technologies, redefined the extent of Proglacial Lake Tight. Using National Elevation Datasets (NEDs) from the USGS, the author incorporated the 275-meter (902-foot) contour elevations into a GIS, spatially correlated the contours with Ohio Department of Natural Resources' GIS glacial, geologic, and topographic datasets, and developed a revised lake boundary that shows the areal extent of Proglacial Lake Tight was approximately 40% larger than has been previously estimated, covering some 25,740 km^{2} (9,940 sq mi). This revised boundary shows that Lake Tight was as large as Lake Erie at its greatest extent. Mapped deposits of the Minford Silt Member of the Teays Formation provide strong evidence for the GIS revised boundary of Proglacial Lake Tight; the Minford's distribution, especially in tributary valleys at the lake's fringes, is compelling evidence for the GIS Lake Tight model.

In 2018, geoscientist James L. Erjavec published a new GIS-based reconstruction of proglacial Lake Tight in The Ohio Journal of Science. The study refined earlier mapping by John F. Wolfe (1942), who delineated the lake's shoreline using the 900-foot contour from approximately 50 U.S. Geological Survey quadrangles. Erjavec's GIS model, employing the 275-meter (902-foot) contour, estimated the ancient lake to be about 43 percent larger—roughly 26,000 km^{2} (10,040 mi^{2})—with a volume of around 1,120 km^{3} (268 mi^{3}). The model provides a spatial framework for analyzing the origin and development of Lake Tight, the effects of pre-Illinoian glaciation, and the evolution of the Ohio River system.

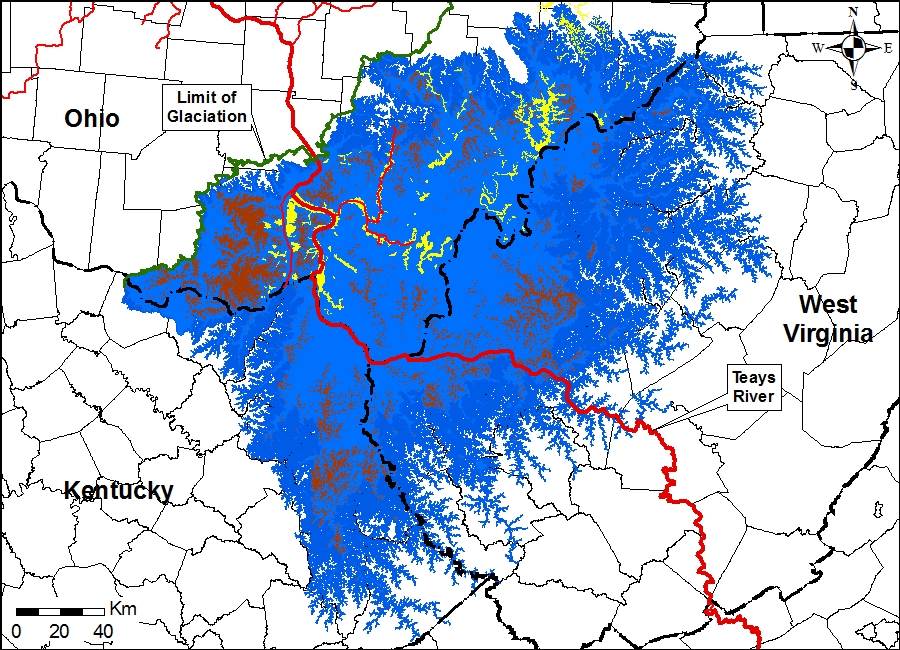
Map of Pleistocene proglacial Lake Tight reconstructed in a GIS environment (Erjavec 2018), showing the estimated extent and spillway elevation of the lake.

== See also ==
- Teays River
- Lake Monongahela
