= James W. Hoge House =

Historic house in West Virginia, United States

- U.S. National Register of Historic Places
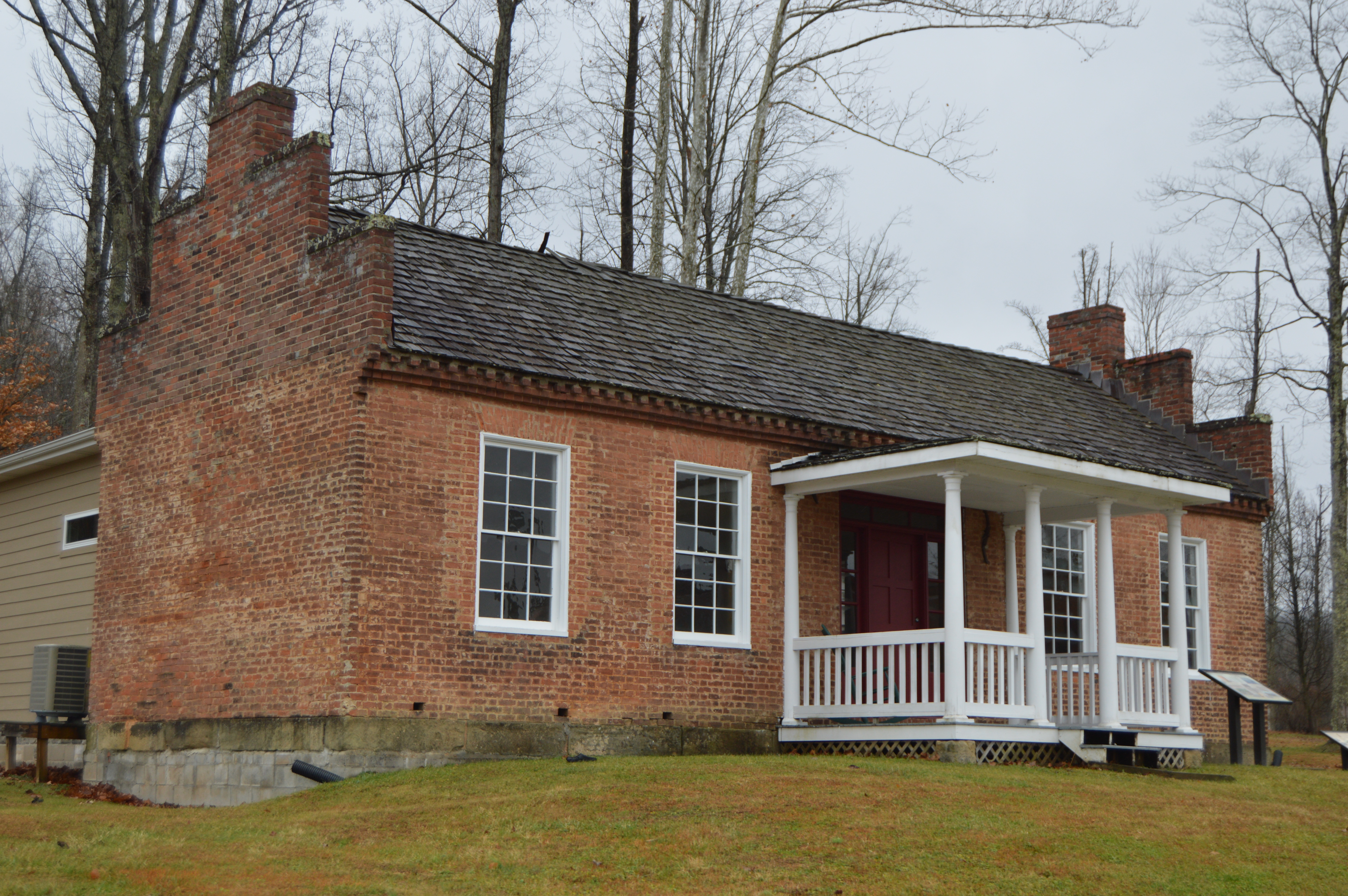
- Front of the house

- Location within West Virginia Location within the United States
- Location: Hoge Ln., Winfield, West Virginia
- Coordinates: 38°31′59″N 81°53′25″W
- Area: 4.5 acres (1.8 ha)
- Built: 1838
- Architectural style: Federal
- NRHP reference No.: 07000783
- Added to NRHP: July 27, 2007

James W. Hoge House is a historic home located in Winfield, Putnam County, West Virginia. It was listed on the National Register of Historic Places in 2007.

== History ==
Its first owner, James W. Hoge, was a lawyer and judge, who represented Putnam County at the Virginia Secession Convention of 1861, voting against the ordinance in April but signing the ordinance later in June. He lived in the house from 1857 until his death in 1882. Charles Brown, who operated a ferry across the Kanawha River using enslaved labor built this house in 1838, and his son Tallyrand inherited it circa 1848 and rented it out until ultimately selling it in 1852, to Capt. John Bowyer (1794–1878), a veteran of the War of 1812 who became Justice of the Peace for Putnam County in 1848, and also served in the West Virginia House of Delegates.

In 2004 it was moved a short distance to its current location in what had been the Hoge family graveyard, to save it from demolition.

The single-story, Federal-style side-gable brick dwelling measures 18 feet by 47 feet, and features stepped parapets at the gable ends and a decorative brick cornice. Also on the property is the Hoge Cemetery, containing approximately 24 graves of Hoge family members, as well as unmarked graves of slaves. Also including in the cemetery is the grave of Philip J. Thurmond (1826–1864), a noted Confederate partisan ranger who was killed during an action at Winfield.
