= Wadeville, West Virginia =

Unincorporated community in West Virginia, United States

Wadesville
- Unincorporated community
- Location within the state of West Virginia Wadesville (the United States)
- Coordinates: 39°9′2″N 81°38′8″W
- Country: United States
- State: West Virginia
- County: Wood
- Elevation: 692 ft (211 m)
- Time zone: UTC-5 (Eastern (EST))
  - Summer (DST): UTC-4 (EDT)
- ZIP codes: 26181
- Area code: 304
- GNIS ID: 1548702

Wadesville is an unincorporated community in Wood County, West Virginia, United States.

The community most likely was named after one Mr. Wade, who was known to have lived near the town site.
