= Saint Joseph, West Virginia =

Saint Joseph
- Unincorporated community
- Location within the state of West Virginia Saint Joseph (the United States)
- Coordinates: 39°43′49″N 80°42′47″W
- Country: United States
- State: West Virginia
- County: Marshall
- Elevation: 1,401 ft (427 m)
- Time zone: UTC-5 (Eastern (EST))
  - Summer (DST): UTC-4 (EDT)
- GNIS ID: 1546246

Saint Joseph is an unincorporated community in Marshall County, in the U.S. state of West Virginia.

== History ==
In the 1840s, German Catholic families emigrated to the United States, bought land from Isaac Hoge, and established a farming community about 6 miles from the Ohio River near Fish Creek in Marshall and Wetzel Counties. It was colloquially called the "German settlement", and its large hilltop church and parochial school were named after St. Joseph. A post office was established in 1877, and remained in operation until 1908. For a while during an oil boom (oil having been discovered under the farms), the town also had a second post office, called Teutonia. Besides the post office, the community had a community hall and country store.
