= Putnam County Courthouse (West Virginia) =

- U.S. National Register of Historic Places
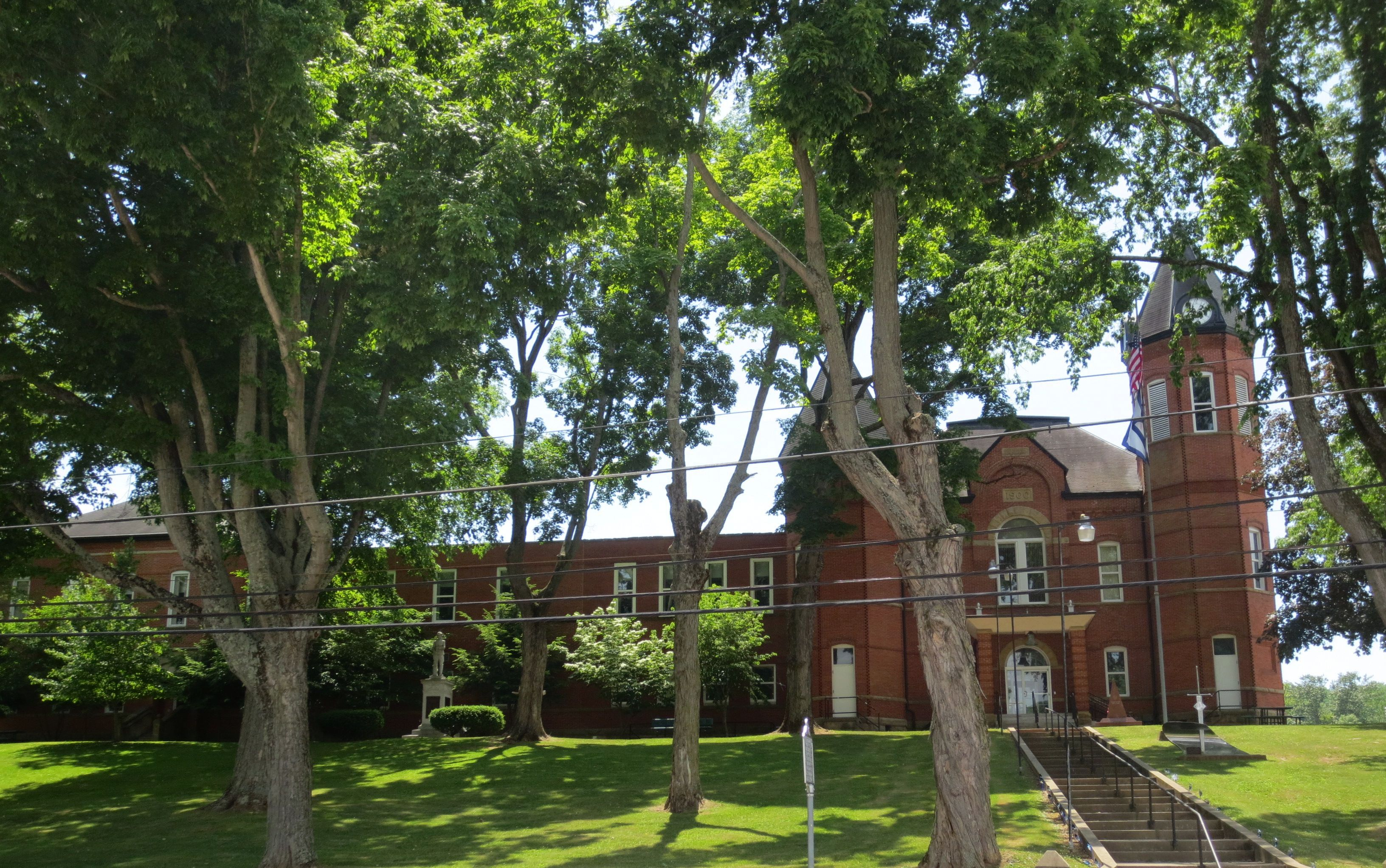

- Location within West Virginia Location within the United States
- Interactive map showing the location of Putnam County Courthouse
- Location: 3389 Winfield Rd., Winfield, West Virginia
- Coordinates: 38°32′1″N 81°53′32″W
- Built: 1900
- Architect: Milburn, Frank Pierce
- Architectural style: Romanesque
- NRHP reference No.: 00000775
- Added to NRHP: July 05, 2000

The Putnam County Courthouse in Winfield, West Virginia was built in 1900 to replace an 1848 structure which partially collapsed in 1899. The Romanesque Revival building was designed by architect Frank Pierce Milburn with a hip roof and octagonal towers at all four corners. It is similar to the Summers County Courthouse in Hinton, West Virginia.
