= Hurricane, West Virginia =

City in West Virginia, US

- City
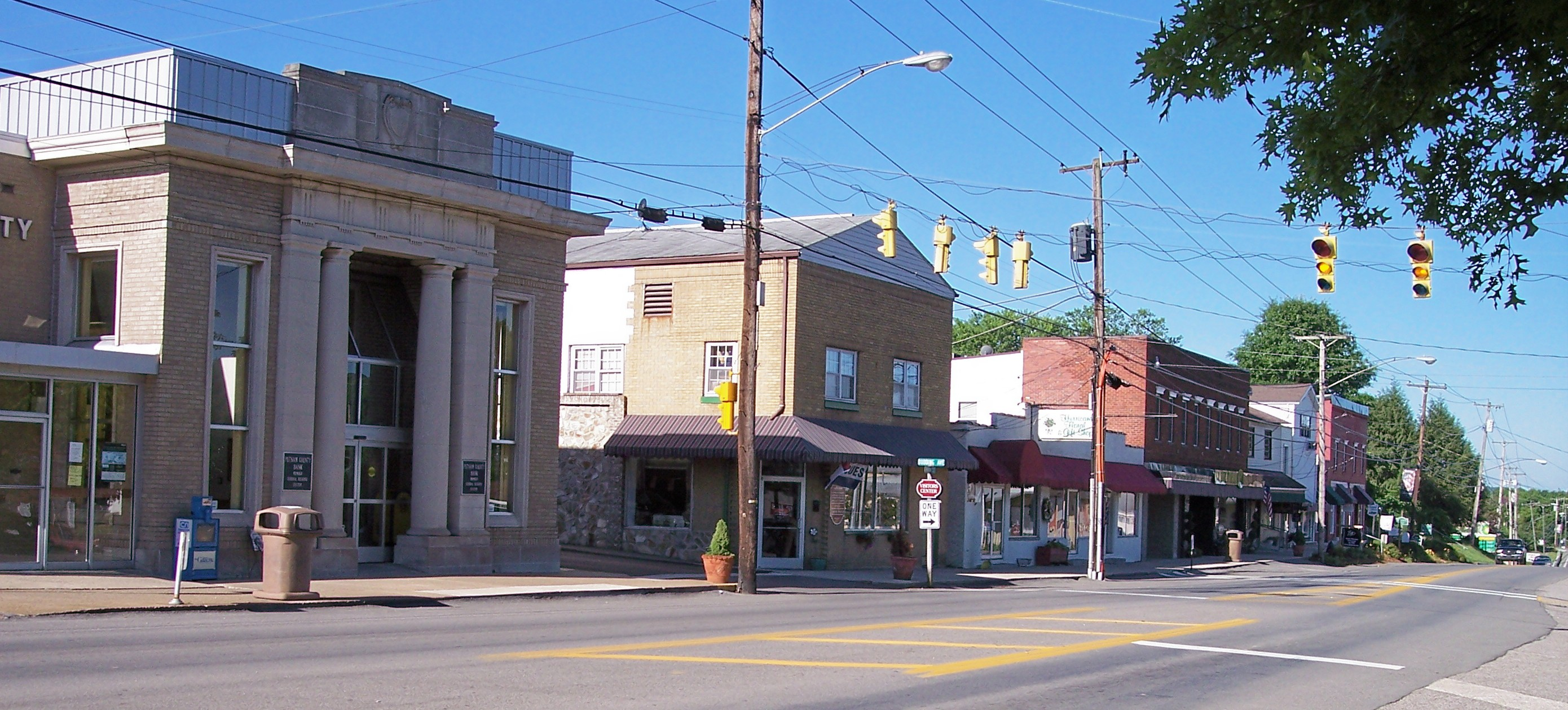
- Main Street in Hurricane in 2007

- Flag

- Location of Hurricane in Putnam County, West Virginia.

- Location within West Virginia Location within the United States
- Coordinates: 38°25′57″N 82°1′11″W
- Country: United States
- State: West Virginia
- County: Putnam
- Incorporated: 1888

Government
  - Type: Mayor–council
  - Mayor: Scott Edwards

Area
  - Total: 3.78 sq mi (9.78 km^{2})
  - Land: 3.75 sq mi (9.70 km^{2})
  - Water: 0.031 sq mi (0.08 km^{2})
- Elevation: 705 ft (215 m)

Population (2020)
  - Total: 6,961
  - Estimate (2021): 6,919
  - Density: 1,717.6/sq mi (663.15/km^{2})
- Time zone: UTC-5 (Eastern (EST))
  - Summer (DST): UTC-4 (EDT)
- ZIP code: 25526
- Area codes: 304, 681
- FIPS code: 54-39532
- GNIS feature ID: 1554759
- Website: http://www.hurricanewv.com/

Audio pronunciation of city's name.

Hurricane (/ˈhərəkɪn/ HUR-uh-kin) (Note: Local residents pronounce the last syllable of the town name approximately like "kin," not "cane" (such as a hurricane, for which the standard American English pronunciation is used).) is a city in Putnam County, West Virginia, United States. The population was 6,977 at the 2020 census. Located roughly equidistant from Charleston and Huntington, it is part of the Huntington–Ashland metropolitan area.

== History ==
Hurricane was named after Hurricane Creek, which was, in turn, named after a group of trees at the arm of the river bent in one direction. A party of surveyors commissioned by George Washington noted the site appeared to have been struck by a hurricane, giving rise to the name. Locals pronounce the town (HURR-i-KINN) not (HURR-i-CANE). Less than 17 miles (27 km) southeast of Hurricane is a post office named Tornado.

A town named Hurricane Bridge was located where West Virginia Route 34 now crosses the creek, near current-day Hurricane. The town can be traced back to an 1811 Virginia map. The town primarily consisted of a large Inn. On March 28, 1863, elements of the Confederate 8th and 16th Virginia Cavalry led by Albert G. Jenkins and Union 13th West Virginia Infantry Regiment led by William R. Brown met at Hurricane Bridge preceding the Jones-Imboden Raid. The Confederates were defeated, but continued on to Point Pleasant, attacking the town in search of munitions and supplies. The engagement later became known as the Battle (or Skirmish) of Hurricane Bridge and directly contributed to the Union Army maintaining control of the James River and Kanawha Turnpike and enabled Federal control of the Kanawha Valley for the remainder of the war.

Hurricane itself can be traced back to 1873, when a railroad track was laid through the town and a small depot was constructed. It was during this period that Main Street developed, along with other businesses in the area. Hurricane was a trading and residential town for tobacco growers and other farmers in the early 1900s. The fire department was established March 2, 1936. It was incorporated as a town in 1888, and as a city in the 1970s.

The three oldest continuously operating businesses are:

- The Hurricane Breeze, a weekly newspaper established October 1900.
- Putnam County Bank, established October 25, 1901.
- Rappold's Barber Shop, established June 1906.

In the early 1990s, the old depot, which once served as the catalyst for the town's development, was torn down and replaced with a small gazebo. It was also during the 1990s that the city began to see a surge in urban growth as several subdivisions were established in the city limits. The population increase resulted in the widening of Route 34, a connecting road to Teays Valley, and an expansion of Hurricane High School.

== Geography ==
Hurricane is located at 38°25′57″N 82°1′11″W (38.432483, -82.019718).

According to the United States Census Bureau, the city has a total area of 3.77 square miles (9.76 km^{2}), of which 3.74 square miles (9.69 km^{2}) is land and 0.03 square miles (0.08 km^{2}) is water. Hurricane is also unique as it sits on a very active rift.

== Demographics ==
Historical population
| Census | Pop. | Note | %± |
|---|---|---|---|
| 1880 | 67 | | — |
| 1890 | 207 | | 209.0% |
| 1900 | 240 | | 15.9% |
| 1910 | 422 | | 75.8% |
| 1920 | 666 | | 57.8% |
| 1930 | 1,293 | | 94.1% |
| 1940 | 1,103 | | −14.7% |
| 1950 | 1,463 | | 32.6% |
| 1960 | 1,970 | | 34.7% |
| 1970 | 3,491 | | 77.2% |
| 1980 | 3,751 | | 7.4% |
| 1990 | 4,461 | | 18.9% |
| 2000 | 5,222 | | 17.1% |
| 2010 | 6,284 | | 20.3% |
| 2020 | 6,961 | | 10.8% |
| 2021 (est.) | 6,919 | | −0.6% |

=== 2020 census ===
As of the 2020 census, Hurricane had a population of 6,961. The median age was 38.9 years. 24.8% of residents were under the age of 18 and 16.0% of residents were 65 years of age or older. For every 100 females there were 94.0 males, and for every 100 females age 18 and over there were 88.9 males age 18 and over.

99.4% of residents lived in urban areas, while 0.6% lived in rural areas.

There were 2,764 households in Hurricane, of which 35.1% had children under the age of 18 living in them. Of all households, 50.3% were married-couple households, 16.2% were households with a male householder and no spouse or partner present, and 27.6% were households with a female householder and no spouse or partner present. About 27.3% of all households were made up of individuals and 12.4% had someone living alone who was 65 years of age or older.

There were 2,967 housing units, of which 6.8% were vacant. The homeowner vacancy rate was 1.6% and the rental vacancy rate was 7.4%.

Racial composition as of the 2020 census
| Race | Number | Percent |
|---|---|---|
| White | 6,409 | 92.1% |
| Black or African American | 85 | 1.2% |
| American Indian and Alaska Native | 11 | 0.2% |
| Asian | 55 | 0.8% |
| Native Hawaiian and Other Pacific Islander | 4 | 0.1% |
| Some other race | 62 | 0.9% |
| Two or more races | 335 | 4.8% |
| Hispanic or Latino (of any race) | 122 | 1.8% |

=== 2010 census ===
As of the census of 2010, there were 6,284 people, 2,499 households, and 1,785 families living in the city. The population density was 1,680.2 inhabitants per square mile (648.7/km^{2}). There were 2,627 housing units at an average density of 702.4 per square mile (271.2/km^{2}). The racial makeup of the city was 96.7% White, 1.0% African American, 0.2% Native American, 0.7% Asian, 0.2% from other races, and 1.2% from two or more races. Hispanic or Latino of any race were 0.9% of the population.

There were 2,499 households, of which 35.2% had children under the age of 18 living with them, 55.0% were married couples living together, 12.2% had a female householder with no husband present, 4.2% had a male householder with no wife present, and 28.6% were non-families. 24.7% of all households were made up of individuals, and 9.5% had someone living alone who was 65 years of age or older. The average household size was 2.51 and the average family size was 3.00.

The median age in the city was 38.1 years. 25.5% of residents were under the age of 18; 6.9% were between the ages of 18 and 24; 27.5% were from 25 to 44; 26.6% were from 45 to 64; and 13.5% were 65 years of age or older. The gender makeup of the city was 47.9% male and 52.1% female.

=== 2000 census ===
As of the census of 2000, there were 5,222 people, 2,098 households, and 1,518 families living in the city. The population density was 1,765.0 people per square mile (681.2/km^{2}). There were 2,258 housing units at an average density of 763.2 per square mile (294.5/km^{2}). The racial makeup of the city was 98.12% White, 0.67% African American, 0.08% Native American, 0.38% Asian, 0.10% from other races, and 0.65% from two or more races. Hispanic or Latino of any race were 0.54% of the population.

There were 2,098 households, out of which 34.4% had children under the age of 18 living with them, 59.2% were married couples living together, 10.1% had a female householder with no husband present, and 27.6% were non-families. 24.8% of all households were made up of individuals, and 9.6% had someone living alone who was 65 years of age or older. The average household size was 2.49 and the average family size was 2.98.

In the city, the population was spread out, with 25.2% under the age of 18, 8.4% from 18 to 24, 30.8% from 25 to 44, 23.1% from 45 to 64, and 12.6% who were 65 years of age or older. The median age was 36 years. For every 100 females, there were 92.6 males. For every 100 females age 18 and over, there were 89.0 males.

The median income for a household in the city was $39,591, and the median income for a family was $43,155. Males had a median income of $34,808 versus $22,972 for females. The per capita income for the city was $20,119. About 8.2% of families and 10.3% of the population were below the poverty line, including 14.6% of those under age 18 and 8.3% of those age 65 or over.

== Culture ==
=== Harrah Organ ===
Hurricane has a massive, six-manual hybrid pipe organ (a combination of pipes and digital voices) with 456 stops, located at the Forrest Burdette Memorial United Methodist Church. Built by Allen Harrah, formerly with Rodgers Organs, it was inaugurated on September 28, 2003. A concert series featuring notable organists from around the U.S., such as Frederick Swann, Paul Jacobs, and Isabelle Demers (Canada) is an ongoing feature.

== Notable people ==
- John "Doc" Holliday, former head football coach at Marshall University
- Lauren Oyler, author and critic
- Tyler Payne, professional baseball player for the Chicago Cubs
- Alex Wilson, MLB relief pitcher for the Boston Red Sox
