= Youngs Bottom, West Virginia =

- Unincorporated community
- Youngs Bottom, West Virginia
- Nickname: The Bottom or the YB
- Location within West Virginia and the United States Youngs Bottom (the United States)
- Coordinates: 38°27′44″N 81°25′35″W
- Country: United States
- State: West Virginia
- County: Kanawha
- Elevation: 640 ft (200 m)
- Time zone: UTC-5 (Eastern (EST))
  - Summer (DST): UTC-4 (EDT)
- GNIS ID: 1556043

Youngs Bottom is an unincorporated community in Kanawha County, West Virginia, United States.
