= Isabelle Demers =

Canadian organist

Isabelle Demers (/dəˈmɛərs/) is a concert organist in Quebec, Canada.

== Life ==
Born in Lachine, Quebec, in 1982, Demers began studying piano at the age of six with Mrs. France David. At the age of 11, she entered the Conservatoire de musique du Québec à Montréal and continued in piano with Madeleine Bélanger and Raoul Sosa. She started studying organ at the age of 16, in private lessons with Yves Garand. The following year, parallel to the piano, she continued to play the organ with Jean Le Buis and Régis Rousseau. She competed in piano and organ in the spring of 2003.

During her stay at the Conservatory, she won many prizes, including second prize in the Montreal Symphony Orchestra Competition in 2000. She is also the recipient of several scholarships from the Wilfrid Pelletier and McAbbie Foundations for her excellent academic results.

In 2003, she received a grant from the Canada Council for the Arts to study piano at the École Normale de Musique de Paris for one year. Having decided to abandon the piano to devote herself to the organ, she auditioned in 2004 at the Juilliard School in New York to do her master's degree. She entered Paul Jacobs's class. She graduated in 2006, at the same time as Daniel Sullivan, Chelsea Chen and Cameron Carpenter. She was awarded the Godfrey Hewitt Fellowship in 2006. Under the supervision of Carl Schachter, she continued her doctoral studies on the motifs used in Bach's St John Passion.

During her studies at Juilliard, she was assistant organist at Trinity Church on Wall Street in New York and participated in several competitions: Miami, Arthur-Poister (Syracuse), Dublin, CCO, NYACOP, Jordan. She played at the 2008 National Convention of the American Guild of Organists, in Minneapolis, and that of Washington, D.C. in 2010.

Following her participation in the "Royal Canadian College of Organists" (RCC/RCCO) national competition in 2005, she was invited to play at the 2009 convention in Toronto.

She was the guest organist at the American Institute of Organbuilders and the International Society of Organbuilders (AIO-ISO) convention held in Montreal in August 2010.

She plays across Canada and the United States and is regularly invited to play at the basilique Notre-Dame de Montréal.

Her virtuoso piano technique and the fact that she plays all her repertoire from memory set her apart in the world of organists.

She currently serves as professor of organ at the Schulich School of Music at McGill University in Montreal.

== Recordings ==
- The new and the old – l’ancien et le nouveau, Acis APL 42386 (2010): J. S. Bach, Prelude and fugue in D major BWV 532 – Prokofiev, 7 pieces from the Romeo and Juliet ballet (transc. Isabelle Demers) – Reger, Introduction, Variations and Fugue on an Original Theme, Op. 73, on the Marcussen organ (1995) in the St. Augustine Chapel of Tonbridge School,(Angland).
