= William G. Tight =

American geomorphologist and educator

William G. Tight

William G. Tight (1865–1910) was an American geomorphologist who became the third president of the University of New Mexico.

Tight was one of the first to decipher the glacial drainage histories of the Illinois, Indiana, Kentucky, Ohio, Virginia and West Virginia area, specifically the long gone Teays River system and Glacial Lake Tight (which takes his name). These discoveries were documented and celebrated in publications and newspaper articles of the time.

== Personal life ==
In 1901 he left his wife and family, a secure job and an unfinished programme of research to become president of the recently formed University of New Mexico in Albuquerque.

He was a member of the Phi Gamma Delta fraternity in college.

== Tenure as President of the University of New Mexico ==
Tight became popular among staff and students for his work developing educational programmes, and directing new building in the pueblo style, still finding time to research the geology and botany of New Mexico. Tight would also introduce the first Greek societies to UNM including the school's first fraternity Alpha Alpha Alpha, which he later tried to convert to a Phi Delta Theta chapter, instead becoming a Pi Kappa Alpha chapter in 1915. Nevertheless, in 1909, he was dismissed by the university's regents in a political move, and to the consternation of the graduating senior class.

More would be known of Tight's life and work had a fire at UNM not destroyed many of his letters and records.
