= Kenna, West Virginia =

- Unincorporated community
- Location within West Virginia Location within the United States
- Coordinates: 38°40′35″N 81°39′36″W
- Country: United States
- State: West Virginia
- County: Jackson
- Time zone: UTC-5 (Eastern (EST))
  - Summer (DST): UTC-4 (EDT)
- ZIP codes: 25248

Kenna is an unincorporated community in southern Jackson County, West Virginia, United States. It lies along West Virginia Route 34 just west of its interchange with Interstate 77, south of the city of Ripley, the county seat of Jackson County. Its elevation is 787 feet (240 m). Although Kenna is unincorporated, it has a post office, with the ZIP code of 25248.

The community was named in honor of John E. Kenna, a United States senator from West Virginia.
