= Winfield, West Virginia =

- City
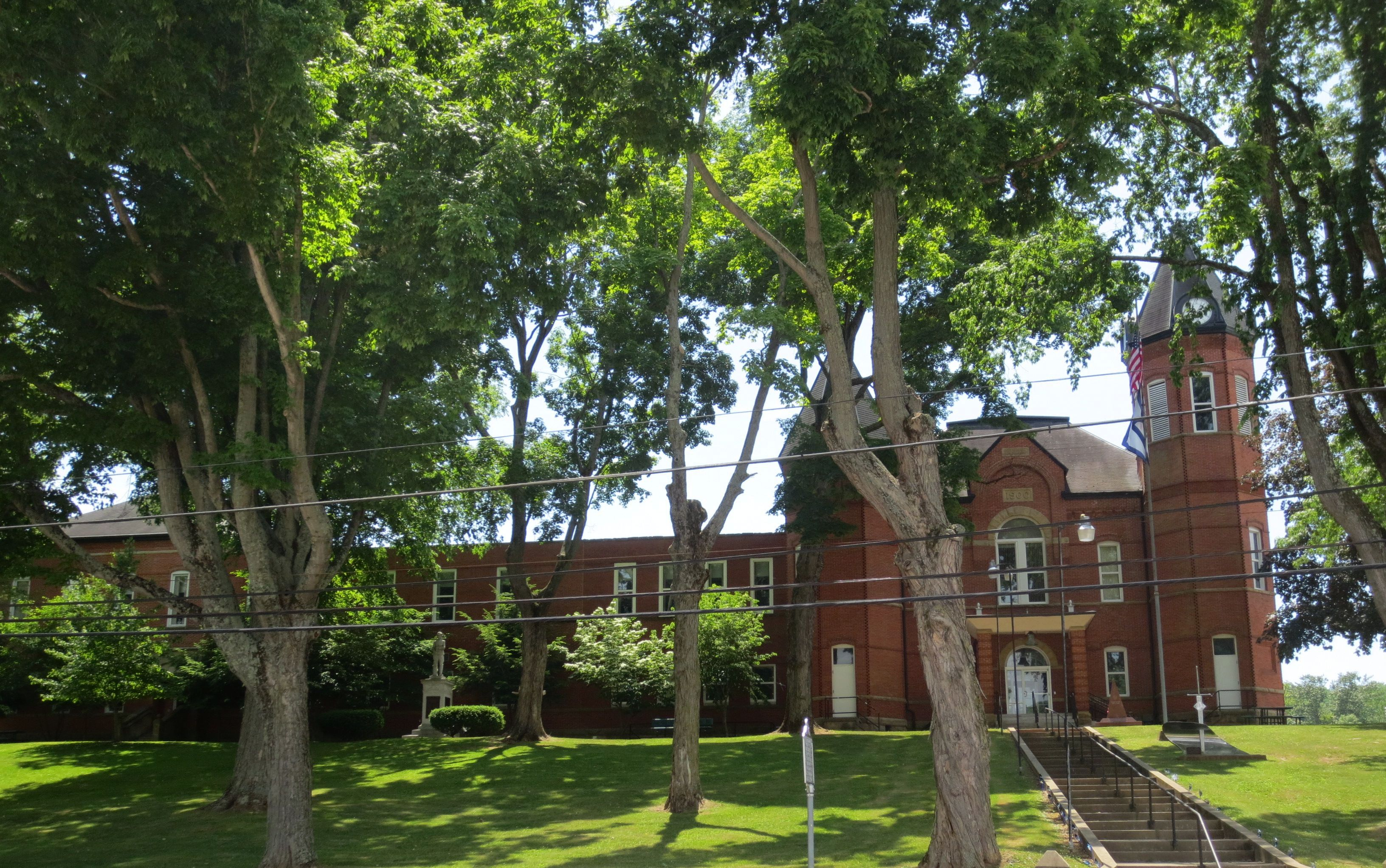
- Putnam County Courthouse
- Interactive map of Winfield, West Virginia
- Location within West Virginia Location within the United States
- Coordinates: 38°32′4″N 81°53′32″W
- Country: United States
- State: West Virginia
- County: Putnam
- Laid out: 1848
- Incorporated: 1868

Government
  - Mayor: Randy L. Barrett

Area
  - Total: 2.43 sq mi (6.29 km^{2})
  - Land: 2.41 sq mi (6.24 km^{2})
  - Water: 0.019 sq mi (0.05 km^{2})
- Elevation: 600 ft (183 m)

Population (2020)
  - Total: 2,397
  - Estimate (2021): 2,390
  - Density: 976.8/sq mi (377.15/km^{2})
- Time zone: UTC-5 (Eastern (EST))
  - Summer (DST): UTC-4 (EDT)
- ZIP code: 25213
- Area code: 304
- FIPS code: 54-87988
- GNIS feature ID: 1556008
- Website: www.cityofwinfield.net

Winfield is a city in and the county seat of Putnam County, West Virginia, United States, along the Kanawha River. The population was 2,397 at the 2020 census. It is part of the Huntington–Ashland metropolitan area.

== History ==
Winfield was established on a 400-acre (160 ha) tract of land owned by Charles Brown. He established a ferry across the river in 1818. The first meeting of the county court was held at the home of Talleyrand P. Brown, in Winfield, on May 22, 1848. The town was incorporated on February 21, 1868, and named in honor of Winfield Scott, the commanding general of the U.S. Army during the Mexican–American War.

The James W. Hoge House, Putnam County Courthouse, and Winfield Toll Bridge are listed on the National Register of Historic Places in 2011.

== Geography ==
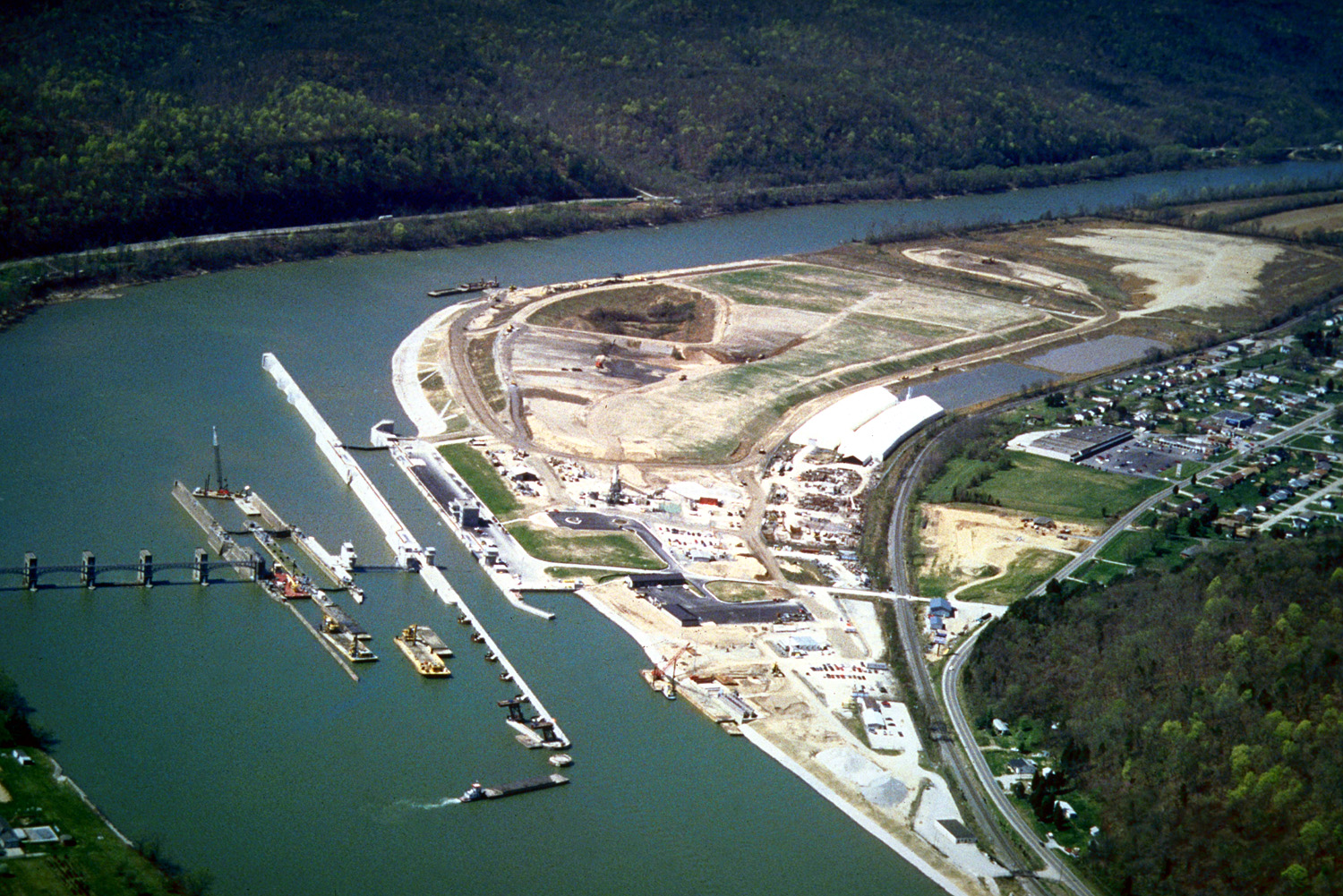
Winfield Lock and Dam on the Kanawha River at Winfield, West Virginia

Winfield is located at 38°32′4″N 81°53′32″W (38.534455, -81.892206).

According to the United States Census Bureau, the town has a total area of 2.43 square miles (6.29 km^{2}), of which 2.41 square miles (6.24 km^{2}) is land and 0.02 square miles (0.05 km^{2}) is water.

Climate data for Winfield (Winfield Locks), West Virginia (1991–2020 normals, extremes 1939–present)
Month	Jan	Feb	Mar	Apr	May	Jun	Jul	Aug	Sep	Oct	Nov	Dec	Year
Record high °F (°C)	80 (27)	81 (27)	87 (31)	93 (34)	96 (36)	102 (39)	101 (38)	103 (39)	102 (39)	96 (36)	87 (31)	80 (27)	103 (39)
Mean maximum °F (°C)	67.2 (19.6)	70.4 (21.3)	77.6 (25.3)	86.2 (30.1)	89.2 (31.8)	92.7 (33.7)	94.5 (34.7)	94.1 (34.5)	92.4 (33.6)	84.7 (29.3)	77.1 (25.1)	68.7 (20.4)	96.0 (35.6)
Mean daily maximum °F (°C)	43.6 (6.4)	47.5 (8.6)	56.3 (13.5)	69.0 (20.6)	76.3 (24.6)	84.0 (28.9)	87.0 (30.6)	86.4 (30.2)	80.7 (27.1)	69.5 (20.8)	57.7 (14.3)	47.3 (8.5)	67.1 (19.5)
Daily mean °F (°C)	33.8 (1.0)	36.8 (2.7)	44.3 (6.8)	55.3 (12.9)	63.9 (17.7)	72.1 (22.3)	75.8 (24.3)	74.9 (23.8)	68.7 (20.4)	57.1 (13.9)	46.0 (7.8)	38.0 (3.3)	55.6 (13.1)
Mean daily minimum °F (°C)	24.0 (−4.4)	26.1 (−3.3)	32.3 (0.2)	41.6 (5.3)	51.4 (10.8)	60.2 (15.7)	64.6 (18.1)	63.4 (17.4)	56.7 (13.7)	44.6 (7.0)	34.3 (1.3)	28.6 (−1.9)	44.0 (6.7)
Mean minimum °F (°C)	6.3 (−14.3)	10.6 (−11.9)	17.7 (−7.9)	27.8 (−2.3)	36.9 (2.7)	49.4 (9.7)	56.2 (13.4)	55.1 (12.8)	44.4 (6.9)	32.1 (0.1)	21.4 (−5.9)	14.3 (−9.8)	3.5 (−15.8)
Record low °F (°C)	−18 (−28)	−9 (−23)	0 (−18)	18 (−8)	27 (−3)	37 (3)	48 (9)	43 (6)	34 (1)	21 (−6)	7 (−14)	−10 (−23)	−18 (−28)
Average precipitation inches (mm)	2.71 (69)	2.93 (74)	3.70 (94)	3.18 (81)	4.07 (103)	3.55 (90)	4.32 (110)	3.68 (93)	2.93 (74)	2.70 (69)	2.58 (66)	3.13 (80)	39.48 (1,003)
Average snowfall inches (cm)	4.1 (10)	2.7 (6.9)	2.6 (6.6)	0.0 (0.0)	0.0 (0.0)	0.0 (0.0)	0.0 (0.0)	0.0 (0.0)	0.0 (0.0)	0.0 (0.0)	0.0 (0.0)	1.3 (3.3)	10.7 (27)
Average precipitation days (≥ 0.01 in)	11.5	11.1	12.4	12.1	12.9	11.9	10.7	9.2	8.1	9.3	9.9	13.1	132.2
Average snowy days (≥ 0.1 in)	2.6	2.0	0.6	0.0	0.0	0.0	0.0	0.0	0.0	0.0	0.0	1.2	6.4
Source: NOAA

== Demographics ==
Historical population
Census	Pop.	Note	%±
1880	305		—
1890	302		−1.0%
1900	338		11.9%
1910	291		−13.9%
1920	253		−13.1%
1930	294		16.2%
1940	318		8.2%
1950	346		8.8%
1960	318		−8.1%
1970	328		3.1%
1980	329		0.3%
1990	1,164		253.8%
2000	1,858		59.6%
2010	2,301		23.8%
2020	2,397		4.2%
2021 (est.)	2,390	▼	−0.3%
U.S. Decennial Census

=== 2010 census ===
As of the census of 2010, there were 2,301 people, 920 households, and 660 families living in the town. The population density was 954.8 inhabitants per square mile (368.7/km^{2}). There were 967 housing units at an average density of 401.2 per square mile (154.9/km^{2}). The racial makeup of the town was 95.2% White, 1.2% African American, 0.3% Native American, 0.7% Asian, 0.7% from other races, and 1.8% from two or more races. Hispanic or Latino of any race were 1.1% of the population.

There were 920 households, of which 35.8% had children under the age of 18 living with them, 56.0% were married couples living together, 10.9% had a female householder with no husband present, 4.9% had a male householder with no wife present, and 28.3% were non-families. 24.1% of all households were made up of individuals, and 8.8% had someone living alone who was 65 years of age or older. The average household size was 2.50 and the average family size was 2.96.

The median age in the town was 40.2 years. 26% of residents were under the age of 18; 6.5% were between the ages of 18 and 24; 25.2% were from 25 to 44; 31% were from 45 to 64; and 11.3% were 65 years of age or older. The gender makeup of the town was 48.2% male and 51.8% female.

=== 2000 census ===
As of the census of 2000, there were 1,858 people, 736 households, and 563 families living in the town. The population density was 694.6 inhabitants per square mile (268.7/km^{2}). There were 777 housing units at an average density of 290.5 per square mile (112.4/km^{2}). The racial makeup of the town was 99.19% White, 0.22% African American, 0.27% Native American, 0.22% Asian, and 0.11% from two or more races. Hispanic or Latino of any race were 0.43% of the population.

There were 736 households, out of which 39.0% had children under the age of 18 living with them, 65.1% were married couples living together, 9.5% had a female householder with no husband present, and 23.5% were non-families. 20.8% of all households were made up of individuals, and 7.3% had someone living alone who was 65 years of age or older. The average household size was 2.52 and the average family size was 2.92.

In the town, the population was spread out, with 25.8% under the age of 18, 6.0% from 18 to 24, 32.2% from 25 to 44, 25.9% from 45 to 64, and 10.1% who were 65 years of age or older. The median age was 38 years. For every 100 females, there were 90.2 males. For every 100 females age 18 and over, there were 86.7 males.

The median income for a household in the town was $51,023, and the median income for a family was $59,196. Males had a median income of $43,885 versus $29,667 for females. The per capita income for the town was $23,564. About 4.5% of families and 4.9% of the population were below the poverty line, including 1.9% of those under age 18 and 5.2% of those age 65 or over.

== Education ==
The Putnam County Schools operates public schools in the area. Schools in the Winfield attendance area include Winfield High School, Winfield Middle School, and Winfield Elementary School.

== Notable people ==
- Michael Barber, former NFL player and College Football Hall of Famer
- Jim Lett, former Major League Baseball Player
- Charles W. Swisher, thirteenth Secretary of State of West Virginia from 1905 to 1909
