= Atkeson =

Atkeson or Attkisson, along with similar spellings, is a surname that originated as a variant of Atkinson, sometimes also spelled Atkenson. While Atkinson originated as a diminutive of Atkin, in Northern England, Atkeson/Attkisson (etc.) now appears to be most common in North America. However, other seemingly similar names, such as Akeson, are more likely to be derived from unrelated surnames such as Åkesson or Akerson (both of which have Swedish origins).

== People with the surname ==
- Carmen Attkisson, stage name Sybil Carmen (1896–1929), US actress and dancer
- Christopher G. Atkeson (b. 1959), US professor of robotics
- Dale Atkeson (1930–2007) American football fullback
- Earl J. Atkisson (1886–1941), US Army officer
- Frank Attkisson (1955–2017), US politician
- Lonna Atkeson (b. 1965), US political scientist
- Ray Atkeson (1907–1990), US photographer
- Samantha Jane Atkeson Morgan (1843–1926), US artist
- Sharyl Attkisson (b. 1961), US journalist
- William O. Atkeson (1854–1931), US politician
- Willie D. Atkeson, after whom Willie D. Atkeson House, in Artesia, New Mexico, was named

== See also ==
- Åkesson
- Atkinson
