= Raymond City, West Virginia =

Raymond City
- Unincorporated community
- Location within West Virginia Location within the United States
- Coordinates: 38°28′52″N 81°48′56″W
- Country: United States
- State: West Virginia
- County: Putnam
- Time zone: UTC-5 (Eastern (EST))
  - Summer (DST): UTC-4 (EDT)
- GNIS feature ID: 1555447

Raymond City is an unincorporated community in Putnam County, West Virginia, United States.

The town is located at the mouth of the Pocatalico River at the Kanawha River on West Virginia Route 62. The community is to the immediate north of the town of Poca.
