= West Virginia Route 869 =

State highway in West Virginia, United States

West Virginia Route 869
- WV 869 highlighted in red

Route information
- Maintained by WVDOH
- Length: 0.94 mi (1,510 m)
- Existed: 1998–present

Major junctions
- West end: US 35 north of Fraziers Bottom
- East end: WV 62 south of Buffalo

Location
- Country: United States
- State: West Virginia
- Counties: Putnam

Highway system
- West Virginia State Highway System; Interstate; US; State
| ← WV 817 | → WV 891 |

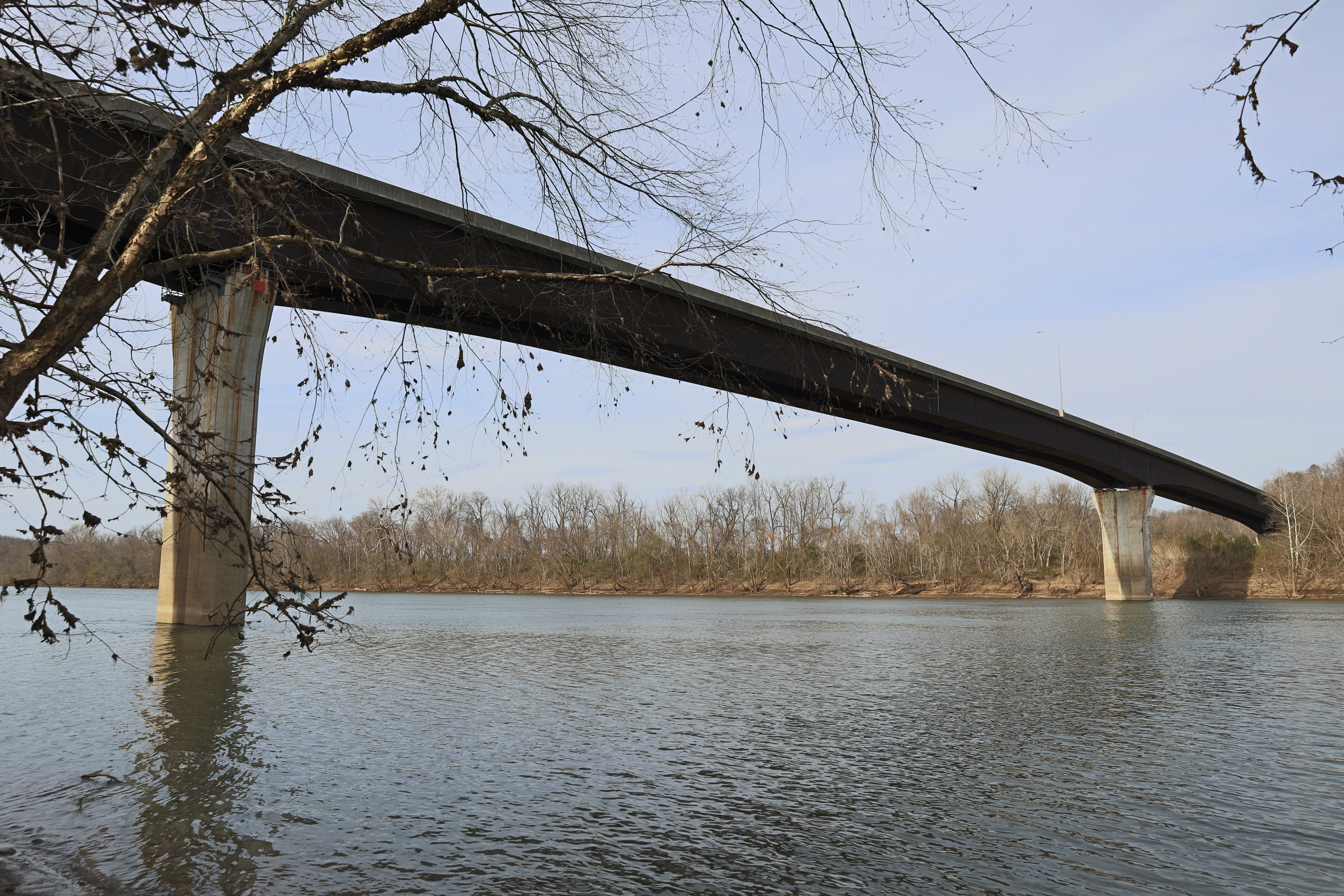
Johnathon Higginbotham Memorial Bridge in 2022

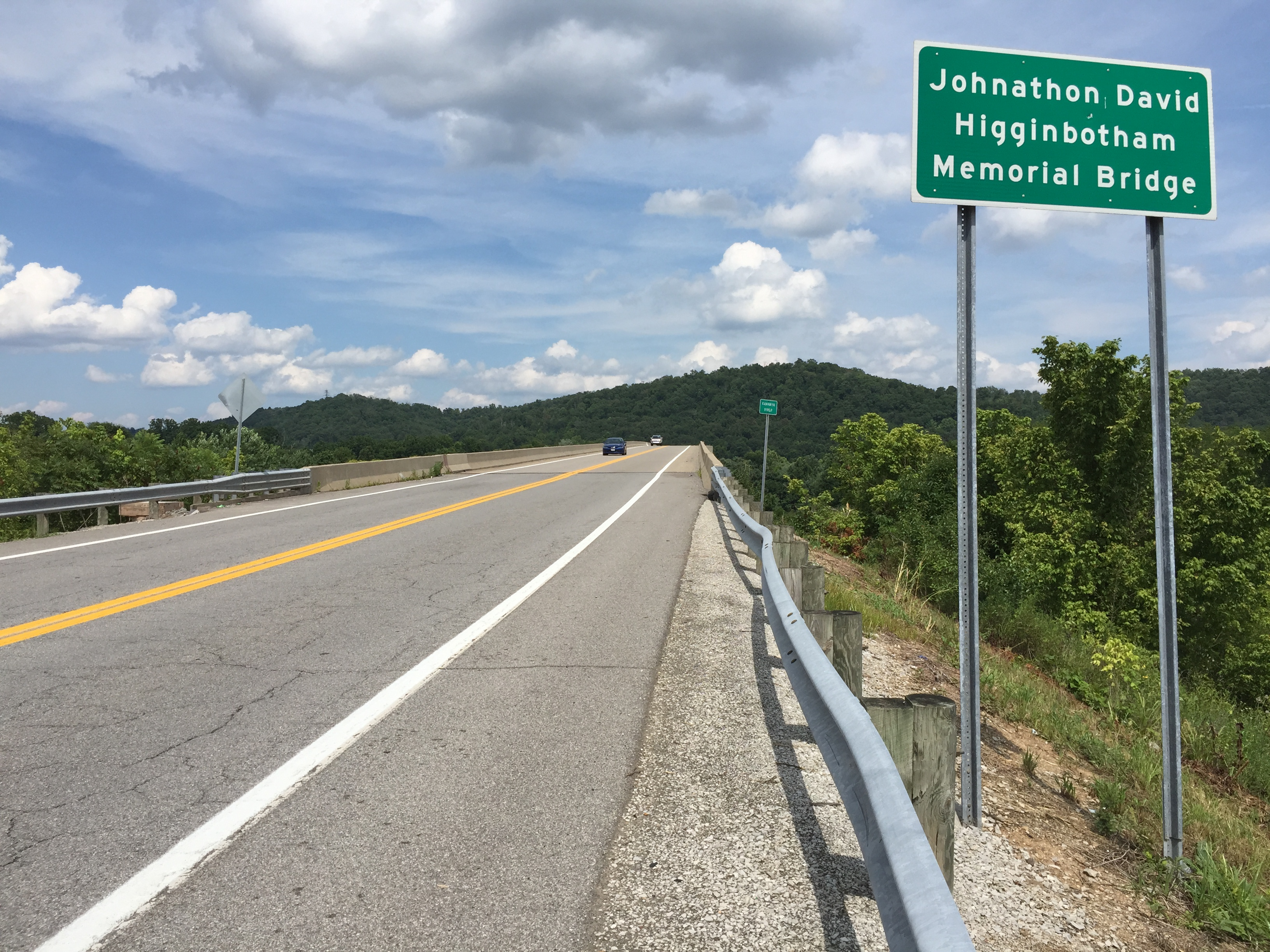
View east along WV 869 at the west end of the bridge over the Kanawha River in Fraziers Bottom

West Virginia Route 869 is a short, one mile (1.6 km) state highway in Putnam County, West Virginia that connects U.S. Route 35 and West Virginia Route 62 via the Lower Buffalo Bridge (officially the Johnathon David Higginbotham Memorial Bridge) over the Kanawha River. The route itself is unsigned on the bridge. The road was commissioned in 1998 to provide an alternate route for the fragile Winfield Bridge for trucks hauling goods for the Toyota Plant in Buffalo.

== History ==
The highway at its western end formerly used a portion of existing US 35 to meet WV 817. WV 817 was formerly signed as US 35, but was resigned as WV 817 when a 4-lane section of US 35 opened.

== Major intersections ==
The entire route is in Putnam County.

| Location | mi | km | Destinations | Notes |
|---|---|---|---|---|
| Fraziers Bottom | 0.00 | 0.00 | US 35 to I-64 – Winfield, Charleston, Point Pleasant | |
| Kanawha River | | | Johnathon David Higginbotham Memorial Bridge | |
| Buffalo | 0.94 | 1.51 | WV 62 – Buffalo, Eleanor | |
1.000 mi = 1.609 km; 1.000 km = 0.621 mi
