= Amherst-Plymouth Wildlife Management Area =

State Wildlife Management Area in Putnam County, West Virginia

Amherst-Plymouth WMA
- IUCN category V (protected landscape/seascape)
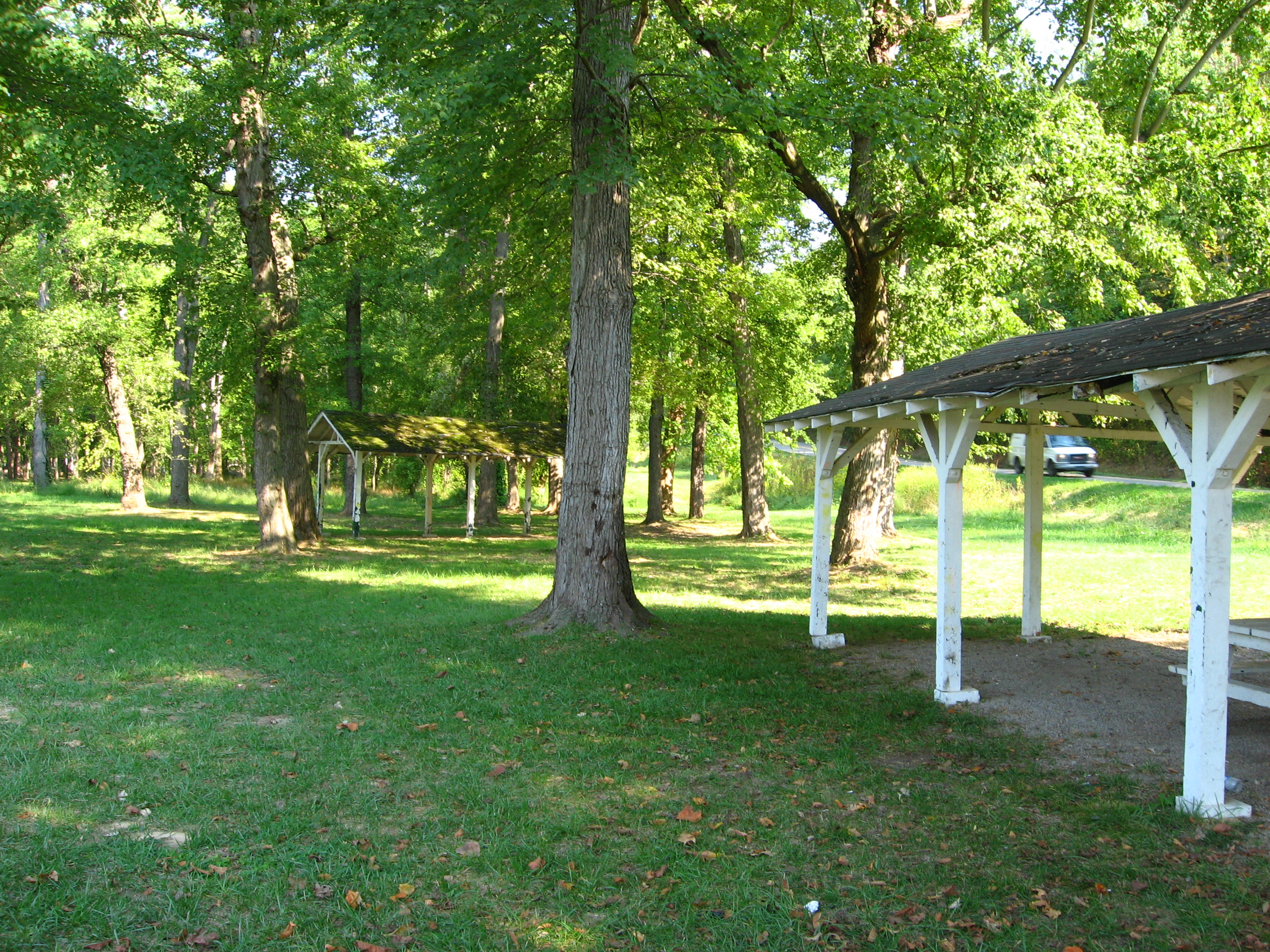
- The community park in Hometown is now part of the Amherst-Plymouth WMA

- Location within West Virginia
- Location: Putnam, West Virginia, United States
- Coordinates: 38°31′16″N 81°51′4″W
- Area: 7,061 acres (28.57 km^{2})
- Operator: Wildlife Resources Section, WVDNR

Amherst-Plymouth Wildlife Management Area is a 7,061-acre (2,857 ha) protected area located in Putnam County, West Virginia. The site is along the banks of the Kanawha River and is popular for hunting Canada geese in the fall. Access is from West Virginia Route 62 between Bancroft and Hometown and from Manilla Creek Road and Heizer Creek Road off WV 62 north of Poca, West Virginia. Manilla Creek Road cuts across the north side of the Amherst-Plymouth WMA, and WV 62 follows the southern edge of the area alongside the Kanawha River.

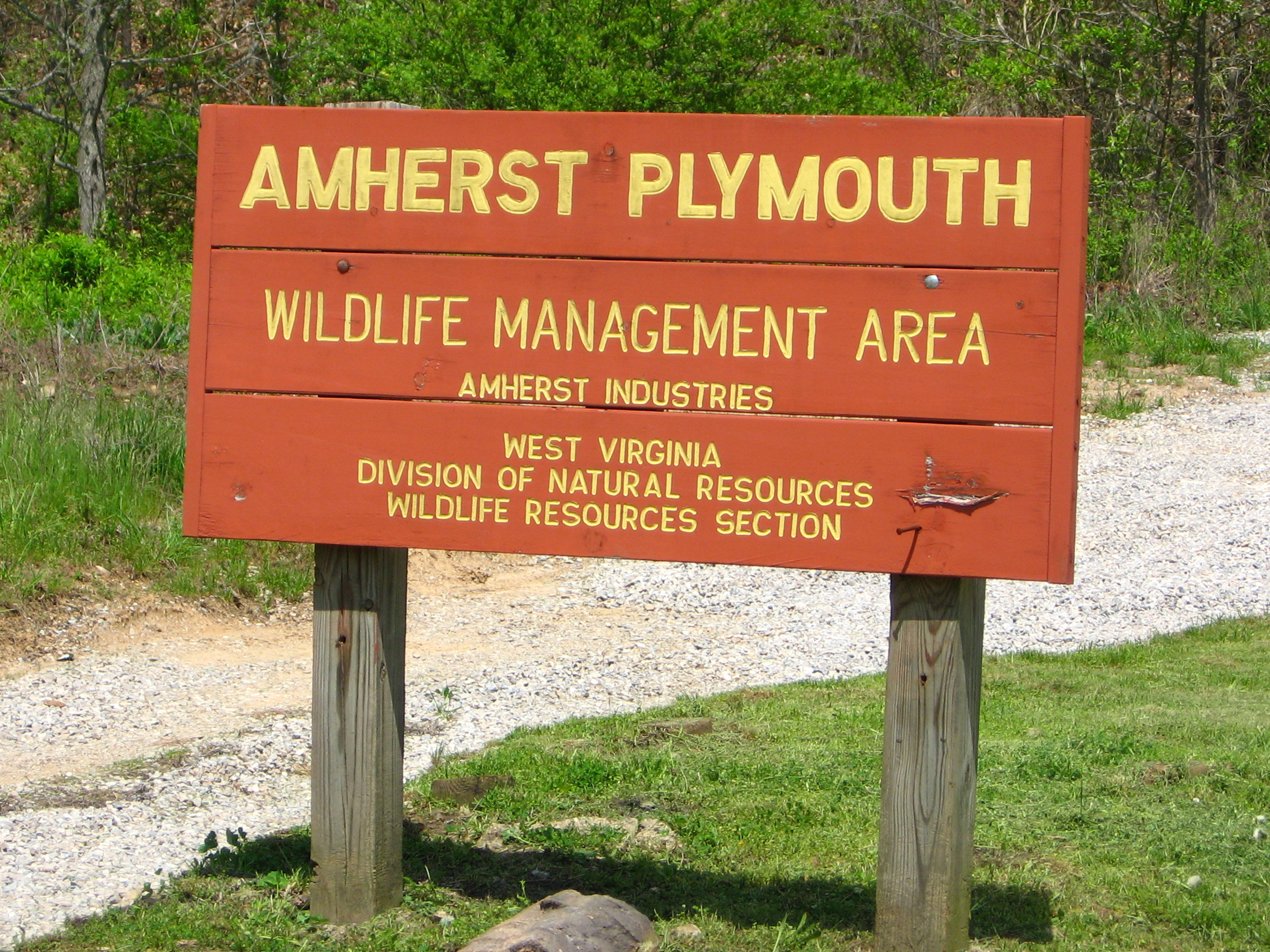
A sign marking an entrance to the WMA

== Hunting and fishing ==
Hunting opportunities include deer, grouse, rabbit, raccoon, squirrel, and turkey. Fishing opportunities from the banks of the Guano Creek backwater and the Kanawha River include hybrid-striped bass, white bass, carp, channel and flathead catfish, freshwater drum, sauger.

== See also ==
- Animal conservation
- List of West Virginia wildlife management areas
- Recreational fishing
