= Robertsburg, West Virginia =

- Unincorporated community
- Location within West Virginia Location within the United States
- Coordinates: 38°39′19″N 81°57′04″W
- Country: United States
- State: West Virginia
- County: Putnam
- Elevation: 581 ft (177 m)
- Time zone: UTC-5 (Eastern (EST))
  - Summer (DST): UTC-4 (EDT)
- Area codes: 304 & 681
- GNIS feature ID: 1558384

Robertsburg is an unincorporated community in Putnam County, West Virginia, United States. Robertsburg is located on the east bank of the Kanawha River along West Virginia Route 62, 3 miles (4.8 km) north-northeast of Buffalo. Robertsburg had a post office, which opened on August 6, 1900, and closed on May 10, 1997.

The community was named after Samuel Roberts, an early settler and pioneer businessperson in the local lumber industry.
