= West Virginia Route 817 =

State highway in West Virginia, United States

West Virginia Route 817

Route information
- Maintained by WVDOH
- Length: 40.3 mi (64.9 km)
- Existed: October 10, 2008–present

Major junctions
- South end: US 60 near St. Albans
- I-64 near Charleston
- North end: US 35 at Point Pleasant

Location
- Country: United States
- State: West Virginia
- Counties: Kanawha, Putnam, Mason

Highway system
- West Virginia State Highway System; Interstate; US; State
← WV 807	→ WV 869

West Virginia Route 817 follows the former path of U.S. Route 35 along the Kanawha River from St. Albans, West Virginia to near Henderson. On October 10, 2008 a new section of US 35 opened to replace this stretch of road. It was expanded as new sections of US 35 were completed, until 35 was completed in November 2021.

== History ==
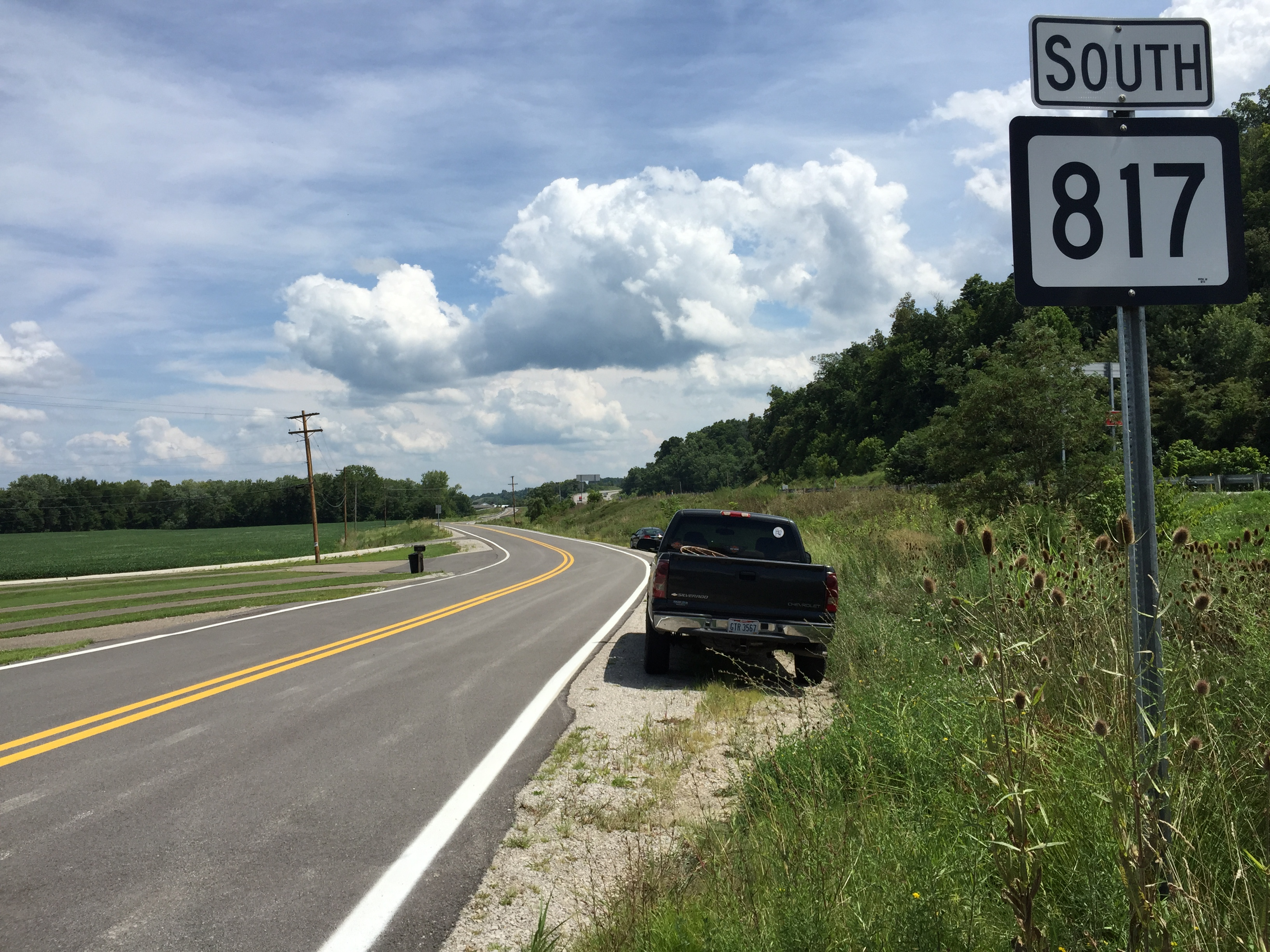
View south along WV 817 at US 35 just southeast of Henderson

Prior to 1969, the route that is now WV 817 was numbered as the original West Virginia Route 17. Following the collapse of the Silver Bridge at Point Pleasant, a new bridge (the Silver Memorial Bridge) was built to carry U.S. Route 35 across the Ohio River. The new bridge was built slightly downstream, now south of the mouth of the Kanawha River. With the new location, West Virginia moved US 35 from the northern bank of the Kanawha River to southern bank, replacing old WV 17. The old path on the northern side of the Kanawha was numbered as West Virginia Route 62.

With its new designation at US 35, this highway became the primary travel route between Charleston and Point Pleasant, and continuing in to Ohio, Columbus and Dayton. Travel on the route continued to build, overwhelming the original 2-lane corridor. The state began planning to construct a replacement 4-lane route, but insufficient funding continually prevented the project. As the state planned to develop land near Buffalo, the old 2-lane US 35 and its slow access to Interstate 64 became a major issue, further increasing the need for a new highway.

When the new U.S. Route 35 highway was opened from Interstate 64 to West Virginia Route 34 on October 10, 2008, West Virginia Division of Highways renamed the old highway as West Virginia Route 817. This number is that of the original West Virginia 17 that was on the route until 1969. When the next section was opened, the old US 35 became WV 817 as well. This number was a change of plans from 2002, when WVDOH planned to keep US 35 on the route from Interstate 64 to U.S. Route 60.
