= West Virginia Route 25 =

State highway in West Virginia, United States

West Virginia Route 25

Route information
- Maintained by WVDOH
- Length: 12.47 mi (20.07 km)

Major junctions
- West end: WV 62 in Rock Branch
- I-64 at Dunbar
- East end: US 60 in Charleston

Location
- Country: United States
- State: West Virginia
- Counties: Putnam, Kanawha

Highway system
- West Virginia State Highway System; Interstate; US; State
← WV 24	→ WV 26

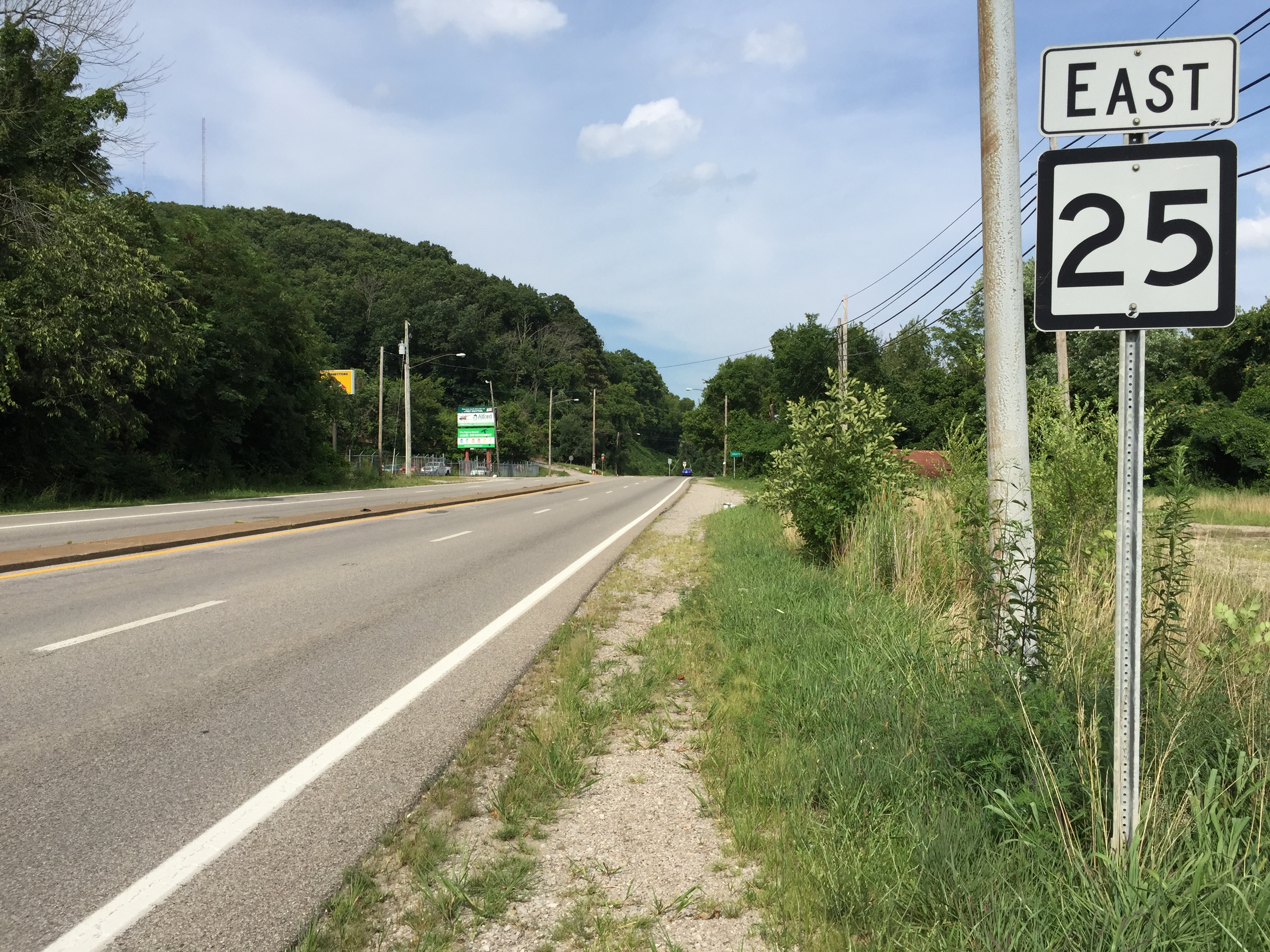
View east along WV 25 at WV 62 in Charleston

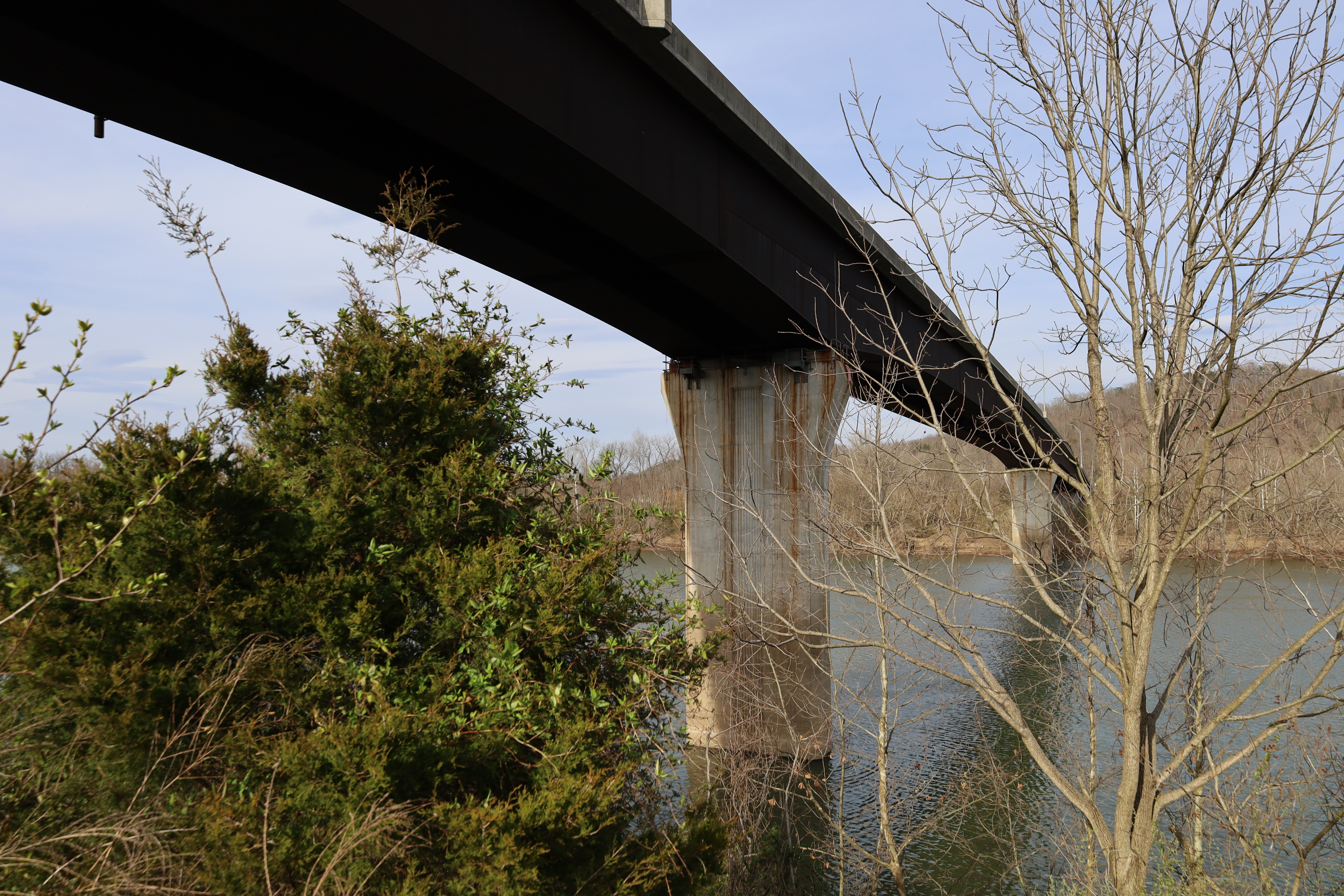
WV 25 crosses the Kanawha River at the Richard J. "Dick" Henderson Memorial Bridge between St. Albans and Nitro.

West Virginia Route 25 is an east–west state highway located within the counties of Kanawha and Putnam in the U.S. state of West Virginia. The western terminus of the route is at West Virginia Route 62 in Rock Branch (unincorporated) between the towns of Nitro and Poca. The eastern terminus is at U.S. Route 60 in Charleston.

== Major intersections ==
County	Location	mi	km	Destinations	Notes
Putnam	Poca			WV 62	
Putnam	Nitro			I-64 – Charleston, Huntington	I-64 exit 45
Kanawha	Nitro			To US 60 (Dick Henderson Bridge) – St. Albans	
Kanawha				WV 622 north – Cross Lanes	
Kanawha	Institute			I-64 – Charleston, Huntington	I-64 exit 50
Kanawha	Dunbar			I-64 / Roxalana Road – Huntington, Charleston	I-64 exit 53
Kanawha	Dunbar			10th Street (to Dunbar Toll Bridge)	
Kanawha	Dunbar–Charleston line			WV 62 north – Cross Lanes	
Kanawha	Charleston			US 60 (Iowa Street)	
1.000 mi = 1.609 km; 1.000 km = 0.621 mi

== See also ==
- List of state highways in West Virginia
