= Plymouth, West Virginia =

Plymouth
- Unincorporated community
- Location within the state of West Virginia Plymouth (the United States)
- Coordinates: 38°30′57″N 81°50′41″W
- Country: United States
- State: West Virginia
- County: Putnam
- Time zone: UTC-5 (Eastern (EST))
  - Summer (DST): UTC-4 (EDT)
- GNIS feature ID: 1545078

Plymouth is an unincorporated community in Putnam County, West Virginia, United States.

The town is located north of the mouth of Guano Creek on the Kanawha River along West Virginia Route 62.

The community was named after Plymouth, Pennsylvania, the native home of two mining officials.

Much of the community is now located within the Amherst-Plymouth Wildlife Management Area.
