= Black Betsy, West Virginia =

Unincorporated community in West Virginia, United States

Black Betsy
- Unincorporated community
- Location within the state of West Virginia Black Betsy (the United States)
- Coordinates: 38°29′59″N 81°50′8″W
- Country: United States
- State: West Virginia
- County: Putnam
- Time zone: UTC-5 (Eastern (EST))
  - Summer (DST): UTC-4 (EDT)
- GNIS feature ID: 1536045

Black Betsy is an unincorporated community in Putnam County, West Virginia, United States. The town is located on the east bank of the Kanawha River on West Virginia Route 62.
