= Cherry Grove, Putnam County, West Virginia =

Unincorporated community in West Virginia, United States

Cherry Grove
- Unincorporated community
- Location within the state of West Virginia Cherry Grove (the United States)
- Coordinates: 38°26′22″N 81°55′19″W
- Country: United States
- State: West Virginia
- County: Putnam
- Elevation: 738 ft (225 m)
- Time zone: UTC-5 (Eastern (EST))
  - Summer (DST): UTC-4 (EDT)
- GNIS ID: 1740670

Cherry Grove is an unincorporated community in Putnam County, West Virginia, United States.
