= Akeson =

Akeson is a surname. Notable people with the surname include:

- Jason Akeson (born 1990), Canadian ice hockey player
- Mark Akeson, American bioengineer

== See also ==
- Åkesson
