= Hometown, West Virginia =

- Census-designated place (CDP)
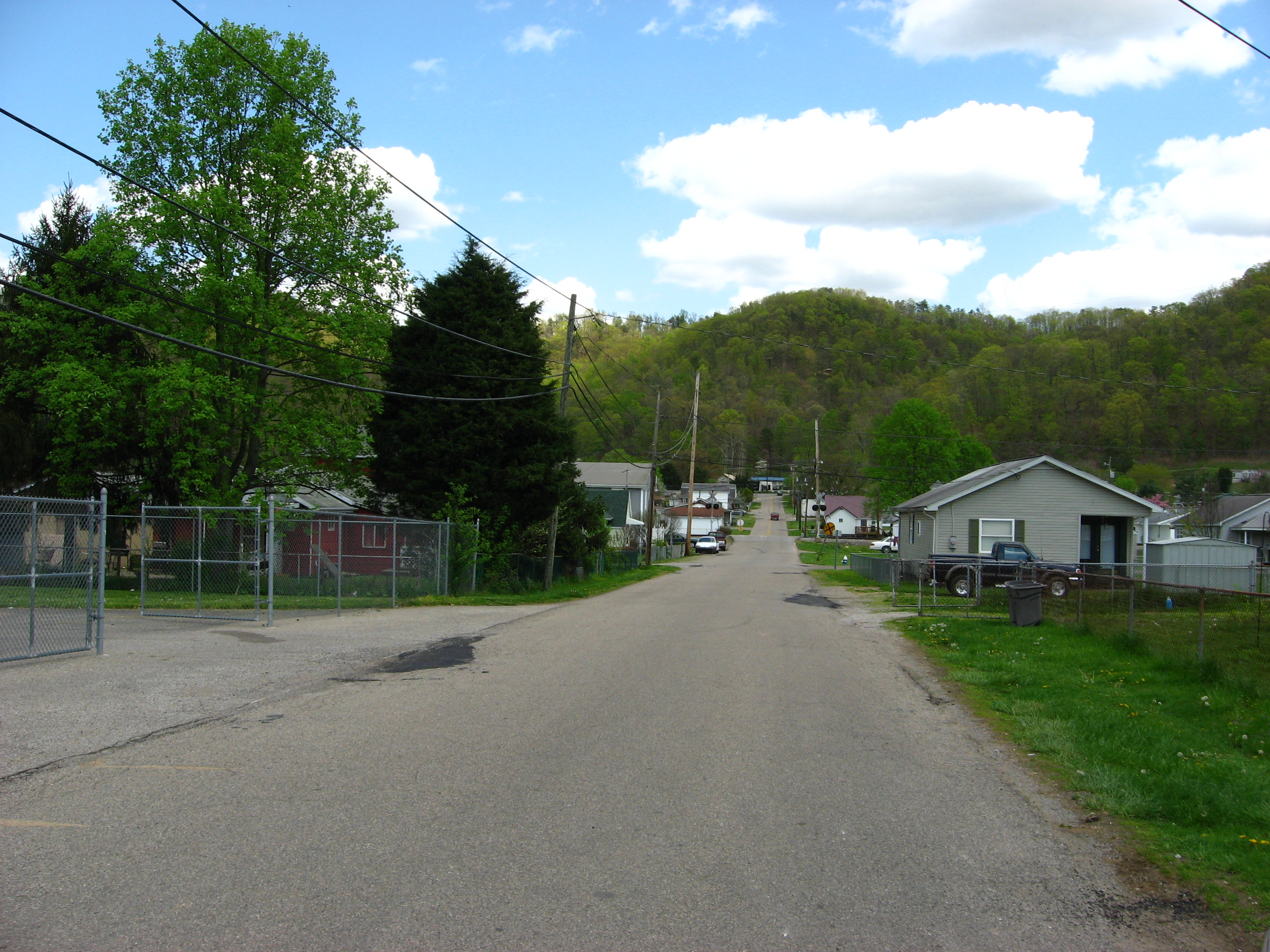
- Hometown

- Location within West Virginia Location within the United States
- Coordinates: 38°31′58″N 81°51′40″W
- Country: United States
- State: West Virginia
- County: Putnam

Area
  - Total: 0.802 sq mi (2.08 km^{2})
  - Land: 0.802 sq mi (2.08 km^{2})
  - Water: 0 sq mi (0 km^{2})

Population (2020)
  - Total: 556
  - Density: 693/sq mi (268/km^{2})
- Time zone: UTC-5 (Eastern (EST))
  - Summer (DST): UTC-4 (EDT)
- ZIP code: 25109

Hometown is a census-designated place (CDP) in Putnam County, West Virginia, United States. As of the 2020 census, its population was 556 (down from 668 at the 2010 census). The community is located along the Kanawha River on West Virginia Route 62. Hometown has six streets that intersect at one street. There is an elementary school. The red house on the left in the photo was constructed for Thomas M. Brown and Ella Mae Criner Brown in the early 1920s, and was the first house built at Hometown. Hometown is a unique community, with no true elected mayor. A dog who roams Hometown and Bancroft is who the residents refer to as the mayor.
