= Ortin Heights, West Virginia =

Ortin Heights
- Unincorporated community
- Location within the state of West Virginia Ortin Heights (the United States)
- Coordinates: 38°26′51″N 81°49′4″W
- Country: United States
- State: West Virginia
- County: Putnam
- Elevation: 610 ft (190 m)
- Time zone: UTC-5 (Eastern (EST))
  - Summer (DST): UTC-4 (EDT)
- GNIS ID: 1555278

Ortin Heights is an unincorporated community in Putnam County, West Virginia, United States.
