= Midway, Putnam County, West Virginia =

Midway
- Unincorporated community
- Location within the state of West Virginia Midway (the United States)
- Coordinates: 38°33′36″N 81°57′50″W
- Country: United States
- State: West Virginia
- County: Putnam
- Time zone: UTC-5 (Eastern (EST))
  - Summer (DST): UTC-4 (EDT)

Midway is an unincorporated community in Putnam County, West Virginia, United States. The community is located on the east bank of the Kanawha River on West Virginia Route 62 at the mouth of Midway Hollow.
