= Samantha Jane Atkeson Morgan =

American artist

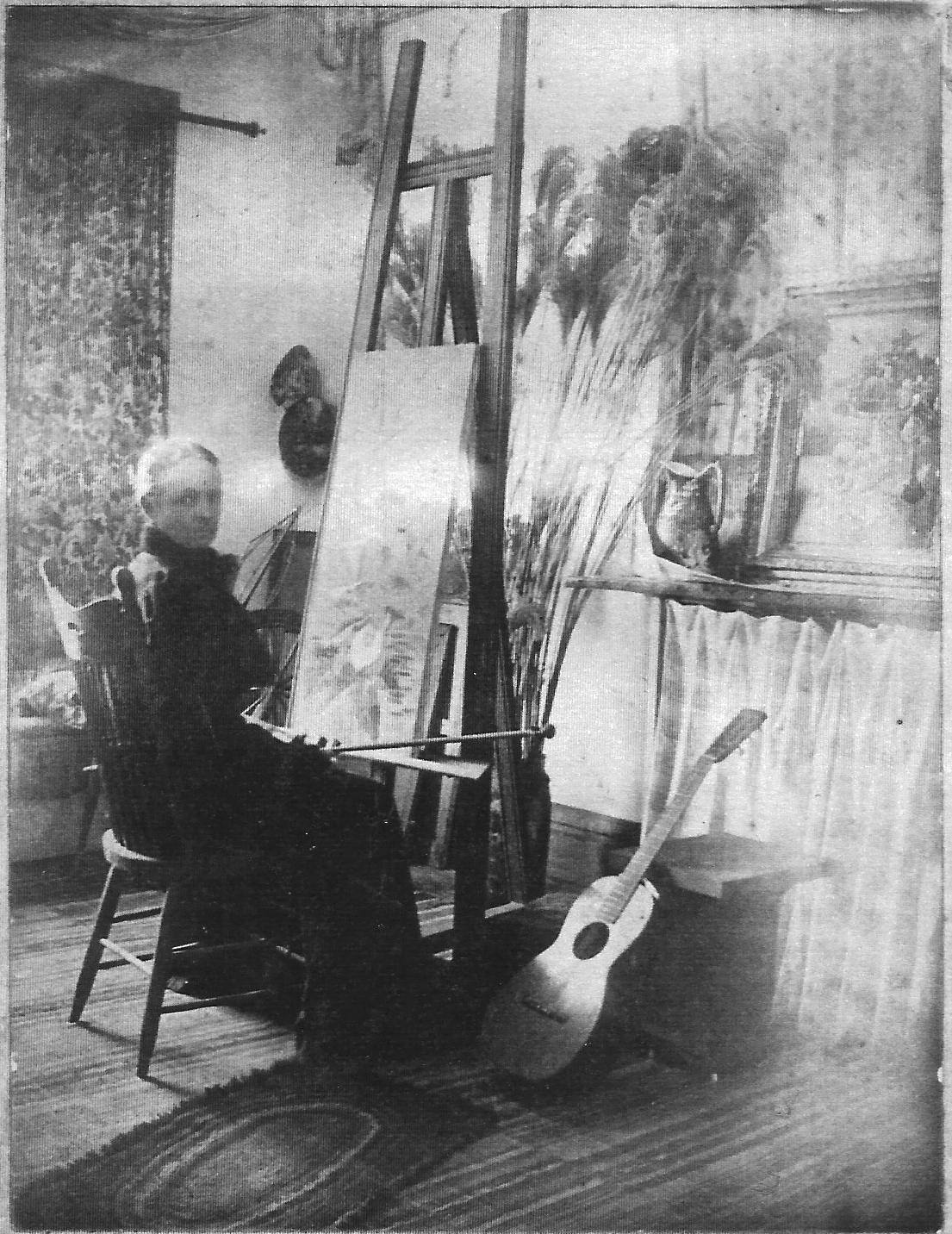
- Born: January 27, 1843; Buffalo
- Died: March 31, 1926 (aged 83); Winfield
- Occupation: Artist
- Relatives: Thomas Clark Atkeson, William O. Atkeson

Samantha Jane Atkeson Morgan (January 27, 1843 – March 31, 1926), was an American painter who lived in Putnam County, West Virginia.

== Biography ==
Samantha Jane Atkeson was born on January 27, 1843 in a log house in Buffalo, Virginia. She was one of nine children of Kanawha Valley settlers Thomas Atkeson and Virginia Harris Brown. Her siblings included US Congressman William Oscar Atkeson and agriculturalist and college president Thomas Clark Atkeson.

After the American Civil War, Atkeson studied at the Cincinnati Academy of Art (now Art Academy of Cincinnati) in Cincinnati, Ohio, then returned to Putnam County for the rest of her life. In 1875, she married John Morgan. They lived in Poca, West Virginia and had four children: John Morgan (1876–1947), Thomas Jefferson Morgan, a photographer (1878–1946), Rembrandt Morgan (1880–1964), and Albert Sidney Morgan (1883–1973).

Throughout her life, Morgan painted portraits, landscapes, and depictions of wildlife. Her work is included in the collections of the West Virginia State Museum. Her son Albert Sidney became an obsessive taxidermist and assembled a large collection of specimens that he exhibited as Morgan's Museum of Natural History, now part of the West Virginia State Farm Museum. She created a number of paintings of his specimens and painted backgrounds for the mounted specimens.

Samantha Jane Atkeson Morgan died of a stroke on March 31, 1926.
