= Pocatalico River =

River in West Virginia, United States

Coordinates: 38.47704°N 81.81708°W

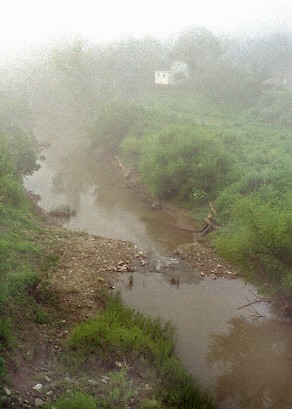
The Pocatalico River at Sissonville on a foggy morning

The Pocatalico River is a tributary of the Kanawha River, approximately 75 miles (121 km) long, in west-central West Virginia in the United States. Via the Kanawha and Ohio rivers, it is part of the watershed of the Mississippi River.

The Pocatalico begins in Roane County near the community of Walton and flows generally southwestwardly through southern Roane, northern Kanawha and southeastern Putnam counties, through the community of Sissonville. It flows into the Kanawha River at the town of Poca.

The Pocatalico River and its watershed experienced severe flooding in March 1997, June 1998, and February 2001. The floods in 1997 and 1998 resulted in National Disaster declarations. The communities of Walton, Cicerone, Sissonville, and Millertown were most seriously impacted.

== Variant names and spellings ==
Pocatalico is a name derived from a Native American language meaning "river of fat doe".

The United States Board on Geographic Names settled on "Pocatalico River" as the stream's name in 1907. According to the Geographic Names Information System, it has also been known historically as:

- Paca River
- Poca River
- Poca Talico River
- Pocatalco River
- Pocatalica River
- Pocataligo River
- Pocatellico River
- Pocatoligo Creek
- Pocotalico River
- Pocotaligo River
- Poctalico Creek
- Pokatalico Creek
- Poketalico Creek
- Pokotellico Creek

== See also ==
- List of West Virginia rivers
