= Dutch Hollow Wine Cellars =

- U.S. National Register of Historic Places
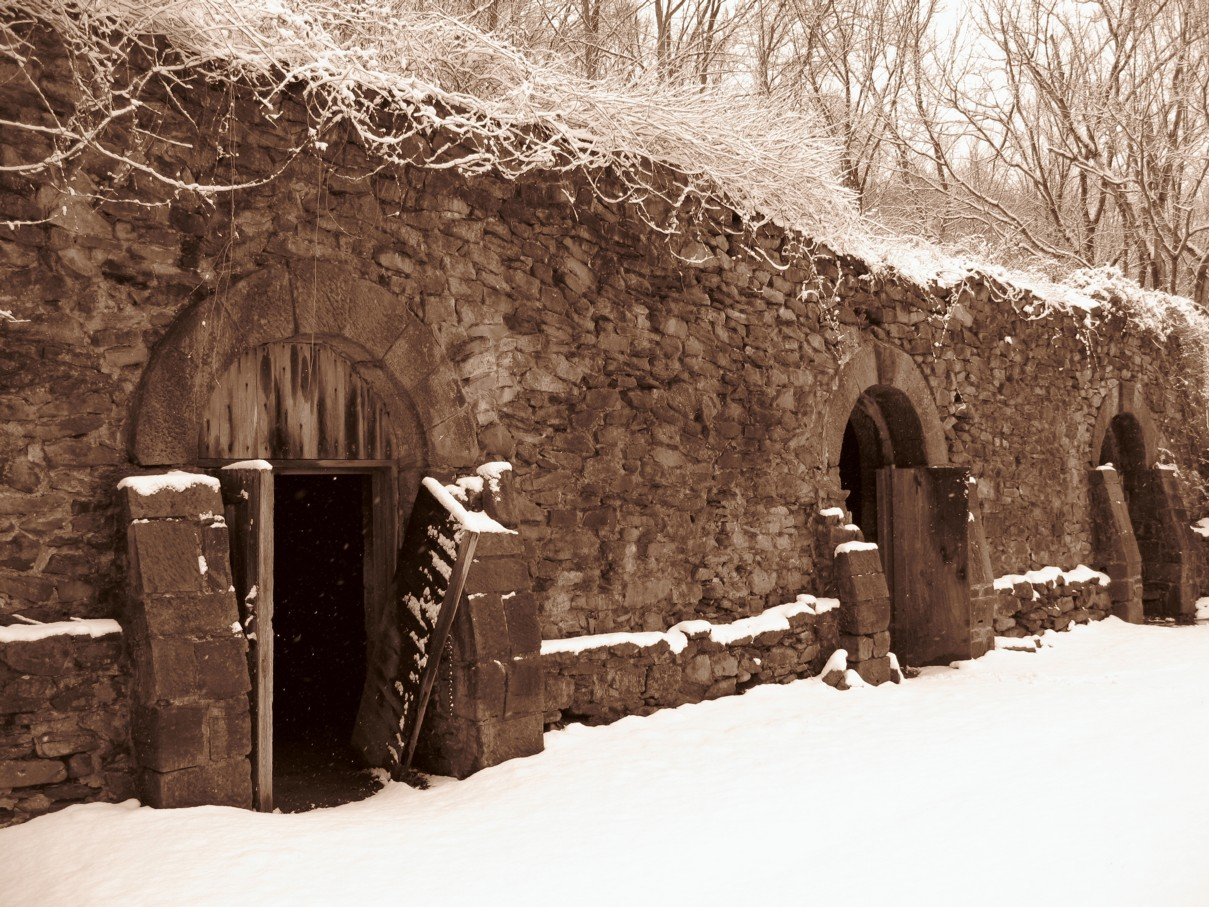

- Location within West Virginia Location within the United States
- Location: Dutch Hollow Rd., Dunbar, West Virginia
- Coordinates: 38°22′20″N 81°44′24″W
- Area: 100 acres (40 ha)
- Built: c. 1855
- NRHP reference No.: 70000654
- Added to NRHP: December 18, 1970

Dutch Hollow Wine Cellars is a historic wine cellar located at Dunbar, Kanawha County, West Virginia. The cellars were built about 1855 and consists of three large stone vaults, 14 feet high at center. The walls are two feet thick. They were used to store wine for the aging process and were in operation for about three years. In 1974, the cellars were purchased by the City of Dunbar as part of a park.

It was listed on the National Register of Historic Places in 1970.
