= Lanham, West Virginia =

Lanham
- Unincorporated community
- Location within the state of West Virginia Lanham (the United States)
- Coordinates: 38°28′37″N 81°44′19″W
- Country: United States
- State: West Virginia
- County: Putnam
- Elevation: 604 ft (184 m)
- Time zone: UTC-5 (Eastern (EST))
  - Summer (DST): UTC-4 (EDT)
- GNIS feature ID: 1541347

Lanham is an unincorporated community in Putnam County, West Virginia, United States. It is part of the Charleston metropolitan area.
