= West Virginia Route 331 =

State highway in West Virginia, United States

West Virginia Route 331
- WV 331 highlighted in red

Route information
- Maintained by WVDOH
- Length: 4.0 mi (6.4 km)

Major junctions
- West end: WV 2 / WV 62 in Mount Alto
- East end: WV 62 / CR 33/17 in Cottageville

Location
- Country: United States
- State: West Virginia
- Counties: Jackson

Highway system
- West Virginia State Highway System; Interstate; US; State
← WV 311	→ WV 338

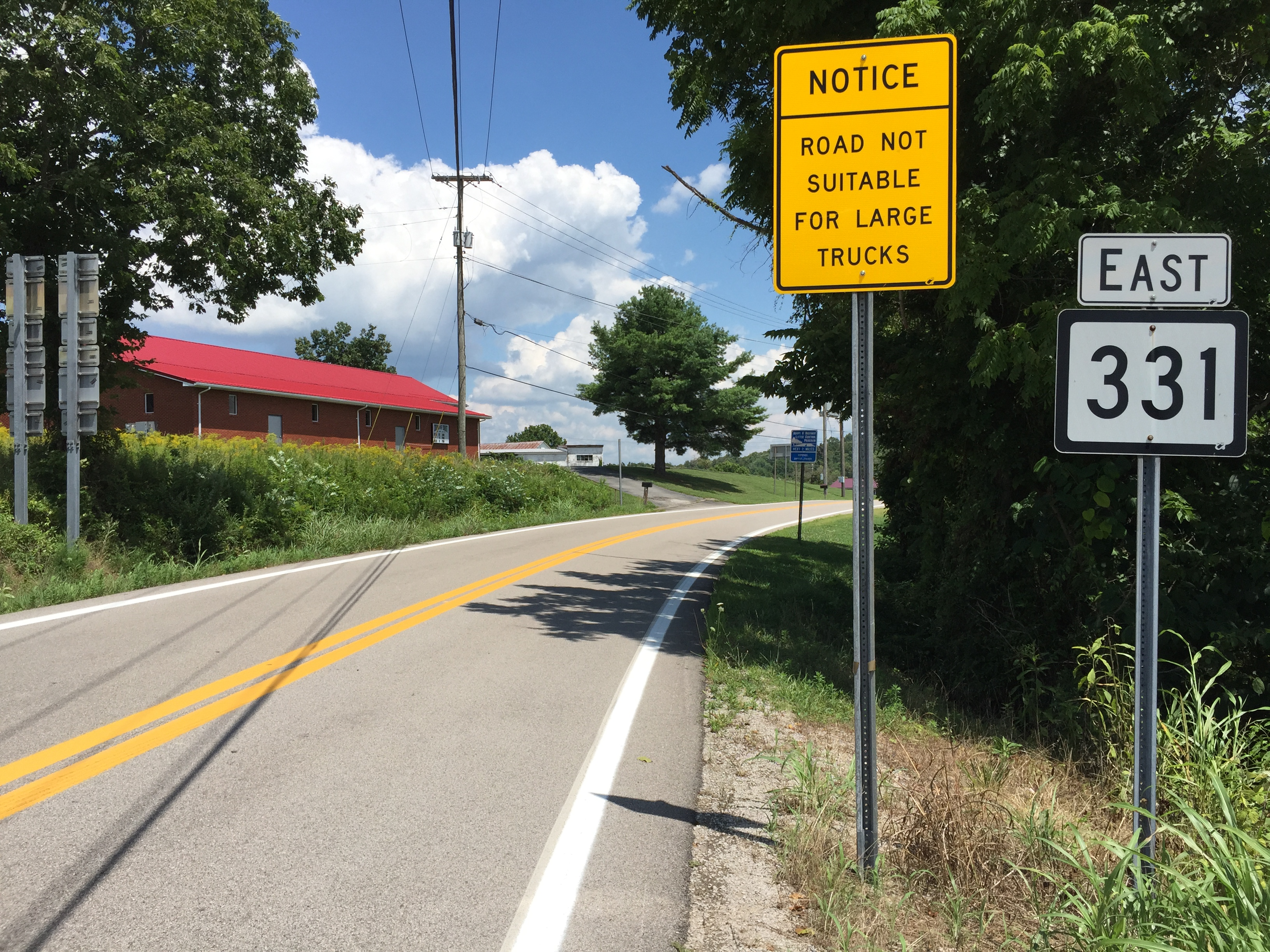
View east along WV 331 at WV 2 in Mount Alto

West Virginia Route 331 (WV 331) is an east–west state highway located entirely in Jackson County, West Virginia. The western terminus of the route is at West Virginia Route 2 and West Virginia Route 62 in Mount Alto. The eastern terminus is at WV 62 near Cottageville.

WV 331 is a former alignment of U.S. Route 33, which was later moved to follow all of present WV 62 between Mason and Ripley.

== Major intersections ==
The entire route is in Jackson County.

Location	mi	km	Destinations	Notes
Mount Alto			WV 2 / WV 62 – New Haven, Point Pleasant, Ravenswood	
			WV 62 / CR 33/17 (Conrad Hill Road) – New Haven, Ripley	
1.000 mi = 1.609 km; 1.000 km = 0.621 mi
