= Extra, West Virginia =

Unincorporated community in West Virginia, United States

Extra
- Unincorporated community
- Location within the state of West Virginia Extra (the United States)
- Coordinates: 38°37′2″N 81°51′5″W
- Country: United States
- State: West Virginia
- County: Putnam
- Elevation: 725 ft (221 m)
- Time zone: UTC-5 (Eastern (EST))
  - Summer (DST): UTC-4 (EDT)
- GNIS ID: 1554425

Extra is an unincorporated community in Putnam County, West Virginia, United States. Its post office closed in 1912.
