= Sam Gordon (baseball) =

American baseball player

- First baseman
- Born: April 21, 1878; Fraziers Bottom, West Virginia, U.S.
- Died: November 30, 1962 (aged 84); Beckley, West Virginia, U.S.
- Threw: Right

Negro league baseball debut
- 1908, for the Indianapolis ABCs

Last appearance
- 1913, for the French Lick Plutos

Teams
- Indianapolis ABCs (1908); Leland Giants (1911); Chicago Giants (1912); French Lick Plutos (1912–1913)

Samuel Simon Gordon (April 21, 1878 – November 30, 1962) was an American Negro League first baseman between 1908 and 1913.

A native of Fraziers Bottom, West Virginia, Gordon attended Wabash College. He made his Negro League debut in 1908 with the Indianapolis ABCs, and went on to play for the Leland Giants, Chicago Giants, and French Lick Plutos. Gordon died in Beckley, West Virginia, in 1962 at age 84.
