= Liberty, West Virginia =

Liberty
- Unincorporated community
- Location within the state of West Virginia Liberty (the United States)
- Coordinates: 38°36′18″N 81°43′47″W
- Country: United States
- State: West Virginia
- County: Putnam
- Time zone: UTC-5 (Eastern (EST))
  - Summer (DST): UTC-4 (EDT)
- ZIP code: 25124
- Area codes: 304 and 681

Liberty is an unincorporated community in Putnam County, West Virginia, United States. It is located on WV 34 between Red House and Fishers Ridge.
