= Åkesson =

Åkesson is a surname. Notable people with the surname include:

- Ellen Åkesson (born 1999), Swedish powerlifter, arm wrestler, and professional wrestler
- Elner Åkesson (1890–1962), Swedish cinematographer
- Fredrik Åkesson, Swedish guitarist
- Jimmie Åkesson (born 1979), Swedish politician
- Joel Åkesson (born 1991), Swedish ice hockey player
- Lena Åkesson (born 1967), Swedish boxer
- Ralf Åkesson (born 1961), Swedish chess grandmaster
- Sonja Åkesson (1926–1977), Swedish writer, poet and artist
- Stefan Åkesson, Swedish skateboarder
- Susanne Åkesson (born 1964), Swedish zoologist
- Vagn Ákason, 10th century Norseman

== See also ==
- Clas Åkesson Tott (1530–1590), military Field Marshal (1572) and member of the Privy Council of Sweden (1575)
- Clas Åkesson Tott the Younger (1630–1674), Field marshal, Governor-General of Swedish Livonia and Ambassador in France
