= Mark Akeson =

American bioengineer

Mark Akeson is an American biomolecular engineer and professor at University of California, Santa Cruz. Akeson was elected a fellow of the National Academy of Inventors in 2024.
