= Mount Alto, West Virginia =

- Unincorporated community
- Location within West Virginia Location within the United States
- Coordinates: 38°51′52″N 81°52′41″W
- Country: United States
- State: West Virginia
- County: Jackson
- Time zone: UTC-5 (Eastern (EST))
  - Summer (DST): UTC-4 (EDT)
- ZIP codes: 25264

Mount Alto is an unincorporated community in far western Jackson County, West Virginia, United States. It lies along West Virginia Route 331, northwest of the city of Ripley, the county seat of Jackson County. Its elevation is 709 feet (216 m). Mount Alto had a post office, which closed on June 20, 2009.

== Notable person ==
Former United States Senator Carte Goodwin, who served briefly in 2010, is a native of Mount Alto.
