= Lonna Atkeson =

American political scientist

- Born: July 2, 1965 (age 61)

Academic background
- Education: BA, 1987, University of California, Riverside; PhD, 1995, University of Colorado Boulder
- Thesis: Divisiveness or Unity? Reassessing the Divisive Nomination Hypothesis in the Presidential Selection Process (1995)

Lonna Rae Atkeson (born July 2, 1965) is an American political scientist. She is the LeRoy Collins Eminent Scholar in Civic Education & Political Science and director of the LeRoy Collins Institute at Florida State University. She is also an associate editor of the political science journal Political Analysis. Her research focuses on campaigns, elections, election administration, public opinion, political behavior, survey methodology, gender, and race and ethnicity.

== Early life and education ==
Atkeson was born on July 2, 1965. She earned her Bachelor of Arts degree in political science from the University of California, Riverside and her doctoral degree in the same subject from the University of Colorado Boulder.

== Career ==
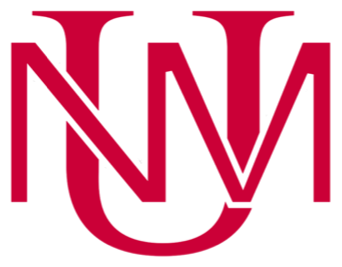
University of New Mexico

Atkeson joined the faculty of political science at the University of New Mexico in 1995 as an assistant professor and was shortly thereafter promoted to UNM Regents' Lecturer. Beginning with the 2006 United States elections, Atkeson has published an election administration report detailing a systematic examination of New Mexico's November General Election. Some of her suggestions for improvement, such as ballots on demand were included in later election systems to increase efficiency. In 2010, Atkeson's work on the election process in the state of New Mexico earned her the Jay Taylor Best in Government Award from Common Cause New Mexico. She was also appointed the director of the University of New Mexico's Center for the Study of Voting, Elections and Democracy and later to the Institute of Social Research.

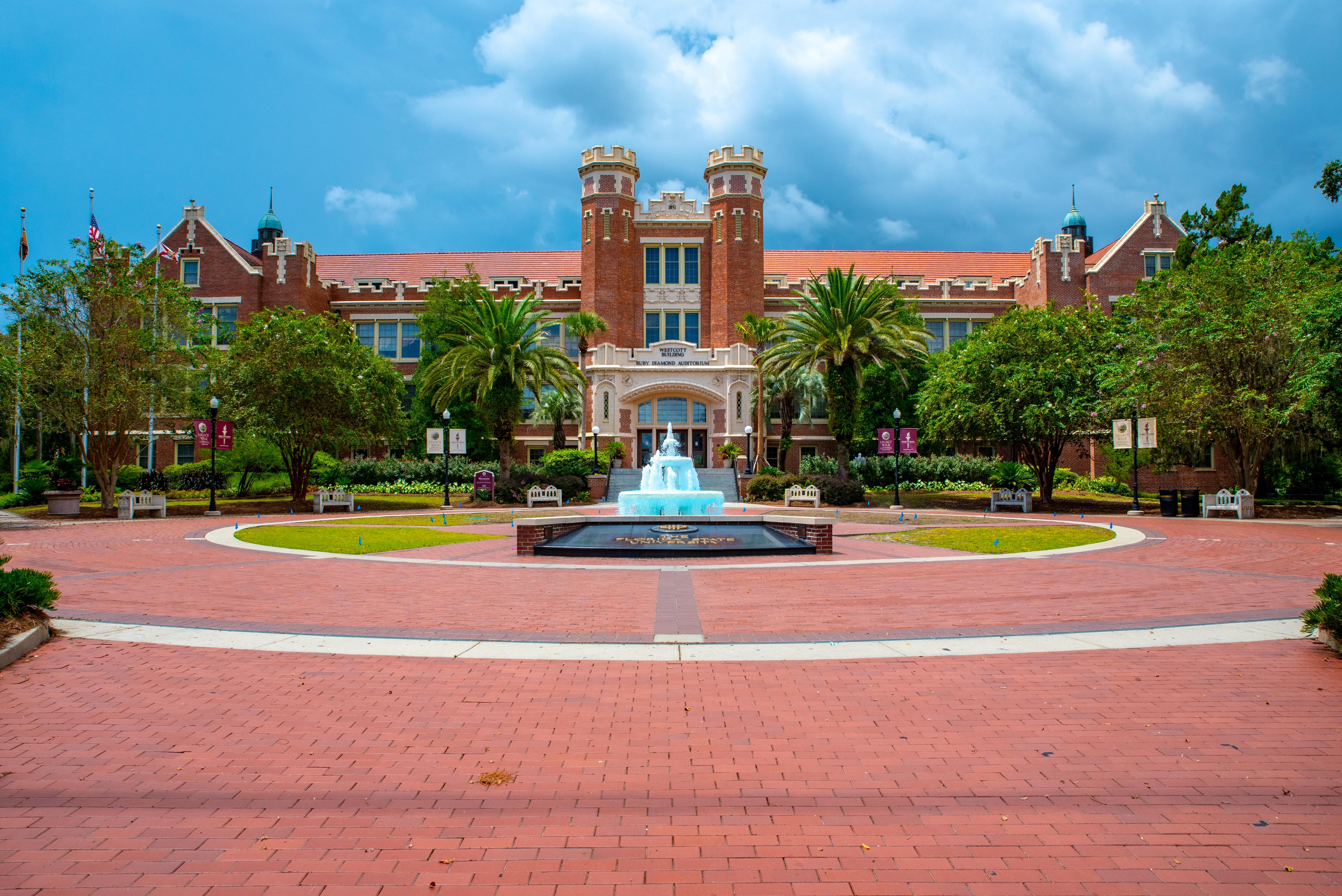
Florida State University

In 2018, Atkeson was appointed an associate editor of the official journal of the Society for Political Methodology and the Political Methodology Section of the American Political Science Association Political Analysis.

Atkeson joined the faculty of political science at Florida State University in 2021 as the LeRoy Collins Eminent Scholar in Civic Education & Political Science and director of the LeRoy Collins Institute.

== Books ==
- Oxford University Press Handbook on Polling and Survey Methods
- Evaluating Elections: A Handbook of Methods and Standards
- Confirming Elections: Creating Confidence and Integrity Through Election Auditing
- Catastrophic Politics: How Extraordinary Events Redefine Perceptions of Government
