= Dunbar, West Virginia =

City in West Virginia, US

City of Dunbar
- City
- Flag

- Location of Dunbar in Kanawha County, West Virginia.
- Coordinates: 38°21′52″N 81°44′22″W
- Country: United States
- State: West Virginia
- County: Kanawha

Government
  - Mayor: Scott Elliott

Area
  - Total: 2.81 sq mi (7.27 km^{2})
  - Land: 2.80 sq mi (7.26 km^{2})
  - Water: 0.0039 sq mi (0.01 km^{2})
- Elevation: 594 ft (181 m)

Population (2020)
  - Total: 7,480
  - Estimate (2021): 7,330
  - Density: 2,531.1/sq mi (977.26/km^{2})
- Time zone: UTC-5 (Eastern (EST))
  - Summer (DST): UTC-4 (EDT)
- ZIP code: 25064
- Area code: 304
- FIPS code: 54-22564
- GNIS feature ID: 1538426
- Website: www.cityofdunbarwv.gov

Dunbar is a city in Kanawha County, West Virginia, United States, situated along the Kanawha River. The population was 7,479 at the 2020 census.

== History ==
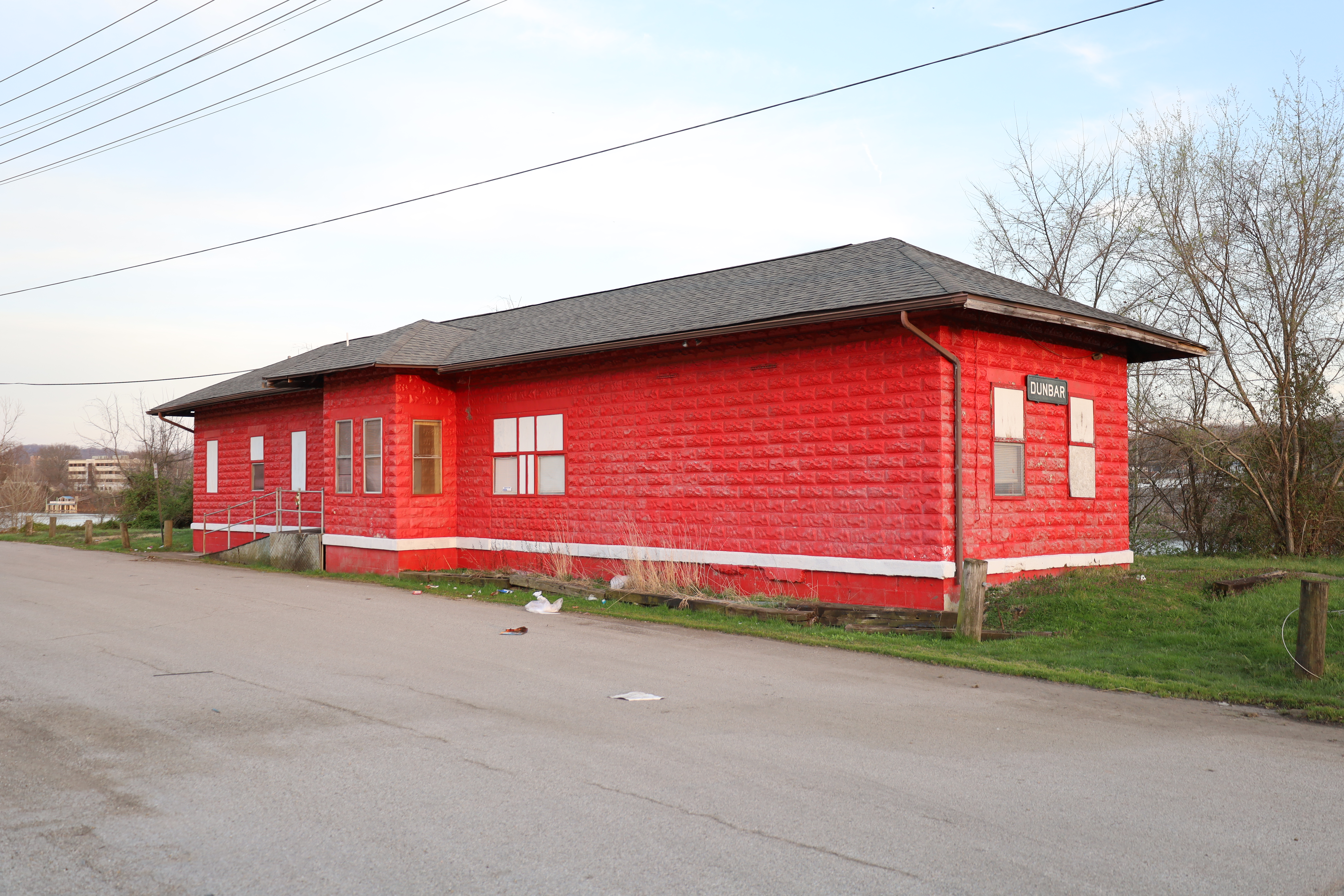
Abandoned Dunbar rail station of the Kanawha and Michigan Railroad in 2022

flag of Dunbar West Virginia

Dunbar was incorporated on April 19, 1921, by an Act of the West Virginia Legislature. Dunbar is on land that was originally occupied by Native Americans with 11 mounds identified in the residential areas. The land was granted to George Washington for his military service and was named for Mary Dunbar after she inherited the land from Washington, although other sources say it was named for Dunbar Baines, a prominent area banker.

Dunbar was a farming community until industries began to evolve in the city with the opening of glass and bottling plants in 1912. The Gravely Plow was invented in Dunbar in 1916.

Located at Dunbar is the Dutch Hollow Wine Cellars, listed on the National Register of Historic Places in 1970. The park is listed on the Register due to the walk-in wine cellars located within the Park. In the past the area was known for its vineyards and the cellars were used to store wine made from the grapes grown in the vineyards. The cellars were thought to be built around 1860 due to the popularity of wine-making. The wine was then hauled to Charleston and Cincinnati. After the Civil War, wine making was no longer profitable and the vineyards were abandoned. The popularity of wine in neighboring Virginia and Ohio also had an impact on grape growing in West Virginia. The wine cellars are preserved and protected for future generations due to the foresight of Dunbar to develop the area into a City park.

== Geography ==
Dunbar is located at 38°21′52″N 81°44′22″W (38.364319, -81.739539). Dunbar is served by Interstate 64 and WV 25.

According to the United States Census Bureau, the city has a total area of 2.81 square miles (7.28 km^{2}), of which 2.80 square miles (7.25 km^{2}) is land and 0.01 square miles (0.03 km^{2}) is water.

== Demographics ==
Historical population
Census	Pop.	Note	%±
1930	4,189		—
1940	5,266		25.7%
1950	8,032		52.5%
1960	11,006		37.0%
1970	9,151		−16.9%
1980	9,285		1.5%
1990	8,697		−6.3%
2000	8,154		−6.2%
2010	7,907		−3.0%
2020	7,480		−5.4%
2021 (est.)	7,330		−2.0%
U.S. Decennial Census

=== 2020 census ===
As of the 2020 census, Dunbar had a population of 7,480. The median age was 44.1 years. 17.8% of residents were under the age of 18 and 23.2% of residents were 65 years of age or older. For every 100 females there were 86.3 males, and for every 100 females age 18 and over there were 82.6 males age 18 and over.

99.7% of residents lived in urban areas, while 0.3% lived in rural areas.

There were 3,546 households in Dunbar, of which 22.4% had children under the age of 18 living in them. Of all households, 30.7% were married-couple households, 22.6% were households with a male householder and no spouse or partner present, and 38.1% were households with a female householder and no spouse or partner present. About 40.6% of all households were made up of individuals and 17.7% had someone living alone who was 65 years of age or older.

There were 4,057 housing units, of which 12.6% were vacant. The homeowner vacancy rate was 4.1% and the rental vacancy rate was 10.5%.

Racial composition as of the 2020 census
Race	Number	Percent
White	5,727	76.6%
Black or African American	1,016	13.6%
American Indian and Alaska Native	21	0.3%
Asian	105	1.4%
Native Hawaiian and Other Pacific Islander	4	0.1%
Some other race	50	0.7%
Two or more races	557	7.4%
Hispanic or Latino (of any race)	138	1.8%

=== 2010 census ===
As of the census of 2010, there were 7,907 people, 3,795 households, and 2,000 families living in the city. The population density was 2,823.9 inhabitants per square mile (1,090.3/km^{2}). There were 4,175 housing units at an average density of 1,491.1 per square mile (575.7/km^{2}). The racial makeup of the city was 82.7% White, 12.2% African American, 0.2% Native American, 1.7% Asian, 0.4% from other races, and 2.7% from two or more races. Hispanic or Latino of any race were 1.0% of the population.

There were 3,795 households, of which 23.2% had children under the age of 18 living with them, 33.8% were married couples living together, 14.8% had a female householder with no husband present, 4.1% had a male householder with no wife present, and 47.3% were non-families. 40.7% of all households were made up of individuals, and 16.2% had someone living alone who was 65 years of age or older. The average household size was 2.05 and the average family size was 2.75.

The median age in the city was 43.2 years. 18.4% of residents were under the age of 18; 7.8% were between the ages of 18 and 24; 25.9% were from 25 to 44; 27.8% were from 45 to 64; and 20.1% were 65 years of age or older. The gender makeup of the city was 45.7% male and 54.3% female.

=== 2000 census ===
As of the census of 2000, there were 8,154 people, 3,744 households, and 2,167 families living in the city. The population density was 2,874.5 people per square mile (1,108.5/km^{2}). There were 4,128 housing units at an average density of 1,455.2 per square mile (561.2/km^{2}). The racial makeup of the city was 85.65% White, 10.72% African American, 0.09% Native American, 1.80% Asian, 0.01% Pacific Islander, 0.18% from other races, and 1.55% from two or more races. Hispanic or Latino of any race were 0.55% of the population.

There were 3,744 households, out of which 21.8% had children under the age of 18 living with them, 41.5% were married couples living together, 13.5% had a female householder with no husband present, and 42.1% were non-families. 37.8% of all households were made up of individuals, and 15.4% had someone living alone who was 65 years of age or older. The average household size was 2.07 and the average family size was 2.72.

In the city, the population was spread out, with 18.1% under the age of 18, 10.3% from 18 to 24, 27.2% from 25 to 44, 23.2% from 45 to 64, and 21.3% who were 65 years of age or older. The median age was 41 years. For every 100 females, there were 82.8 males. For every 100 females age 18 and over, there were 77.0 males.

The median income for a household in the city was $35,117, and the median income for a family was $42,665. Males had a median income of $34,816 versus $24,184 for females. The per capita income for the city was $19,030. About 13.2% of families and 15.3% of the population were below the poverty line, including 26.5% of those under age 18 and 10.1% of those age 65 or over.
