= Joel Åkesson =

Swedish ice hockey player

- Born: June 27, 1991 (age 34) Östersund, Sweden
- Height: 6 ft 3 in (191 cm)
- Weight: 196 lb (89 kg; 14 st 0 lb)
- Position: Left wing
- Shoots: Left
- Hockeyettan team Former teams: Östersunds IK; Linköpings HC (Elitserien)
- NHL draft: Undrafted
- Playing career: 2008–present

Joel Akesson (born June 27, 1991) is a Swedish professional ice hockey player. He is currently playing with Östersunds IK of the Swedish Hockeyettan.

Akesson played one game with Linköpings HC in the Elitserien during the 2009–10 Elitserien season.
