= Toyota Motor Manufacturing West Virginia =

Automotive parts plant in Buffalo, West Virginia, US

Coordinates: 38°35′43″N 81°59′37″W

Toyota Motor Manufacturing, West Virginia, Inc.
- Company type: Subsidiary
- Industry: Automotive
- Founded: 1996; 30 years ago
- Headquarters: Buffalo, West Virginia
- Key people: David Rosier (president)
- Products: Engines and transmissions
- Number of employees: 2,000 (2022)
- Parent: Toyota Motor North America

Toyota Motor Manufacturing West Virginia (TMMWV) is a Toyota Motor Corporation factory in Buffalo, West Virginia. It is a subsidiary of Toyota Motor North America, itself a subsidiary of Toyota Motor Corporation of Japan. It is estimated to date, the company has spent nearly US$1 billion to build the automobile engine and transmission plant. The plant solely builds engines and transmissions; no vehicles are produced at this facility.

In February 2021, Toyota Motor Corp announced it would invest $210 million to expand engine production in West Virginia and add 100 new jobs.

The Japanese automaker said it would boost capacity by 70,000 engines a year at the Buffalo, West Virginia plant, up from the nearly 1 million transmissions and engines it produces annually for vehicles assembled in North America.

== Engines produced ==
- 2.4 L T24A turbo I4 (2022–present)
- 2.5 L A25A I4 (2018–present)

== Former engines produced ==
- 1.8 L 1ZZ-FE I4 (2004–2008)
- 1.8 L 2ZR-FE I4 (2007–2022)
- 3.3 L 3MZ-FE V6 (2004–2008)
- 3.5 L 2GR-FE V6 (2005–2017)
- 3.5 L 2GR-FKS V6 (2016–2023)

== Transmissions produced ==
- UA80 8-speed automatic transmission (2016–present)
- UA660 6-speed automatic transmission (2018–present)
- Toyota Hybrid System II eCVT transaxle (2018–present)

== Former transmissions produced ==
- 5-speed automatic transmission (1998–2010)
- 4-speed automatic transmission (1998–2004)
