= Cottageville, West Virginia =

Unincorporated community in West Virginia, United States

- Unincorporated community
- Location within West Virginia Location within the United States
- Coordinates: 38°51′56″N 81°49′24″W
- Country: United States
- State: West Virginia
- County: Jackson
- Time zone: UTC-5 (Eastern (EST))
  - Summer (DST): UTC-4 (EDT)
- ZIP codes: 25239

Cottageville (also Moores Mill, Rhodess Mill, or Wrights Mill) is an unincorporated community in western Jackson County, West Virginia, United States. It lies along West Virginia Route 331 northwest of the city of Ripley, the county seat of Jackson County. Established in 1858, its elevation is 594 feet (181 m). Although Cottageville is unincorporated, it has a post office, with the ZIP code of 25239. As of the 2020 census, Cottageville had a population of 114. It also is the site of the annual Jackson County Junior Fair. Michael Coleman, a well known early Indian fighter, was killed and buried in the area, according to a historical marker placed by the state of WV. The wooden Grist Mill located here since the 1840s burned to the ground in the summer of 1965. Its foundation stones remain. It had remained in operation full-time until 1930, part-time until 1937. Cottageville was a commercial center with a bank, newspaper, tannery, blacksmith, several stores, a railroad station on the B & O and many other businesses in the early part of the twentieth century. Its heyday faded with the closing of the mill and the improvement of roads in the county. The B & O pulled up its tracks to the county seat, Ripley, in the mid-nineteen-sixties. Less than a mile from the old town, the county operated what folks called the "poor farm," an early version of a welfare commune. That closed in the thirties with the New Deal. That land is now the Jackson County Junior Fairgrounds.
