= Akerson =

Akerson is a surname. Notable people with the surname include:

- Daniel Akerson (born 1948), American businessman
- George Edward Akerson (1889–1937), American journalist

== See also ==
- Arne Åkerson (born 1940), Swedish Olympic sailor
