= St. Albans, West Virginia =

City in West Virginia, US

- City
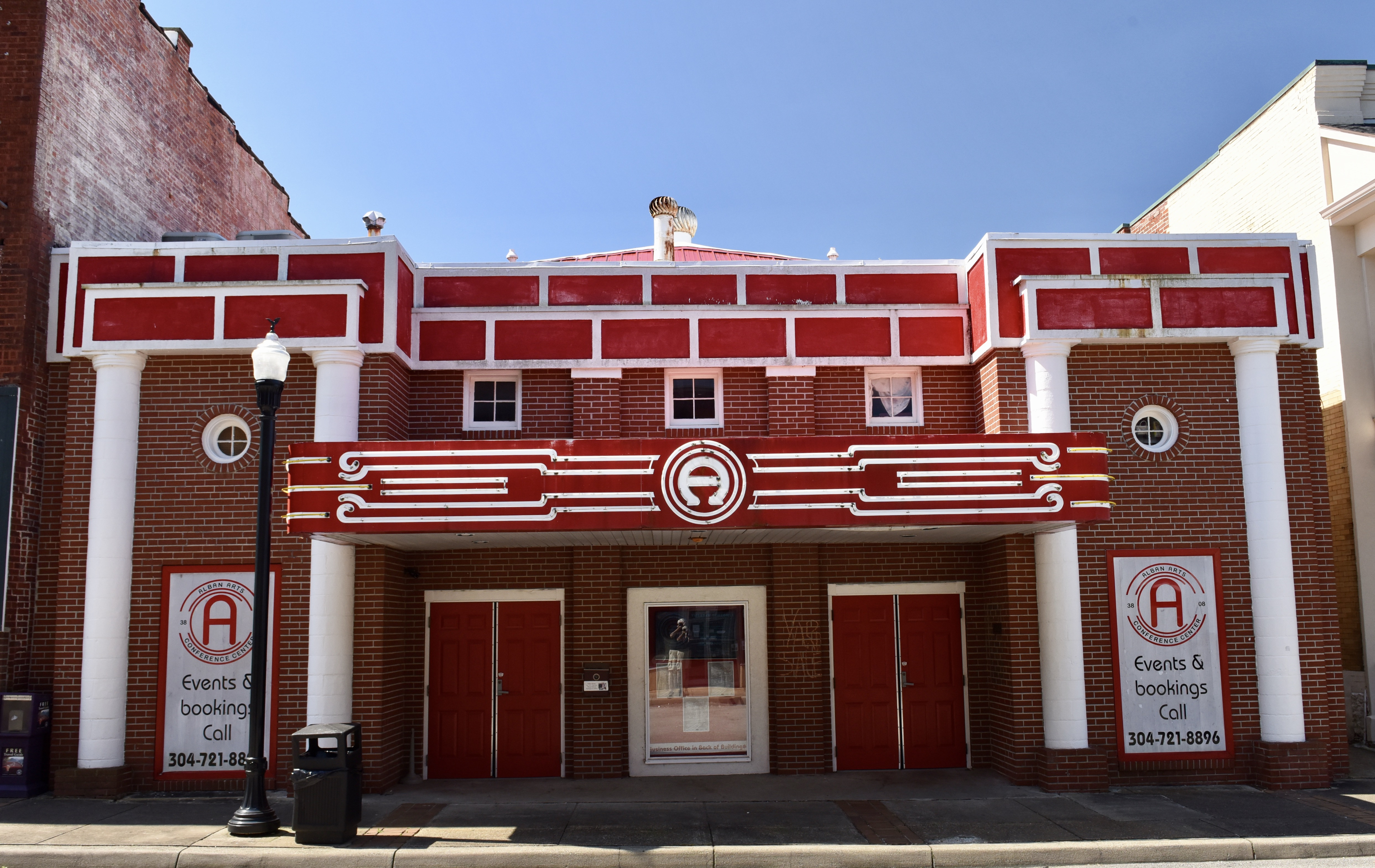
- Alban Theater

- Seal

- Location of St. Albans in Kanawha County, West Virginia.
- Coordinates: 38°22′49″N 81°49′11″W
- Country: United States
- State: West Virginia
- County: Kanawha
- Laid out: 1816
- Incorporated: 1868

Government
  - Mayor: David Scott James

Area
  - Total: 3.69 sq mi (9.56 km^{2})
  - Land: 3.61 sq mi (9.36 km^{2})
  - Water: 0.077 sq mi (0.20 km^{2})
- Elevation: 610 ft (186 m)

Population (2020)
  - Total: 10,861
  - Estimate (2021): 10,635
  - Density: 2,743.7/sq mi (1,059.34/km^{2})
- Time zone: UTC-5 (Eastern (EST))
  - Summer (DST): UTC-4 (EDT)
- ZIP Code: 25177
- Area code: 304
- FIPS code: 54-71212
- GNIS feature ID: 1555553
- Website: www.stalbanswv.com

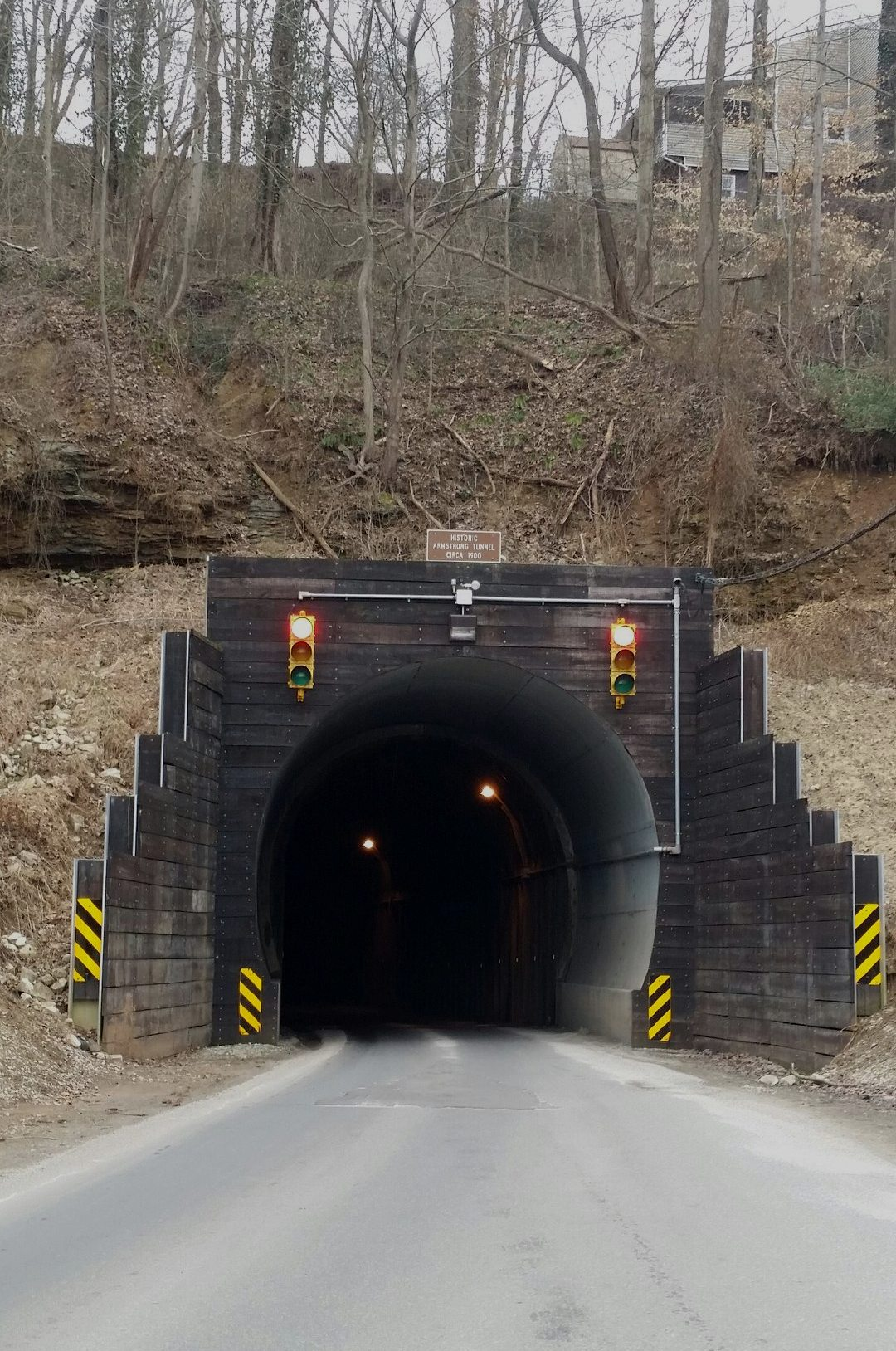
Armstrong Tunnel, circa 1900, in St. Albans on Dogwood Rd

St. Albans is a city in western Kanawha County, West Virginia, United States, at the confluence of the Kanawha and Coal rivers. The population was 10,861 at the 2020 census. It is part of the Charleston metropolitan area.

== History ==
St. Albans was laid out in 1816. Originally, it was known as Philippi, after Philip Thompson, an early settler, the name afterwards being changed to Coalsmouth due to the city's proximity to the mouth of the Coal River. The city was then incorporated as Kanawha City in 1868. The town was renamed in 1872 by H.C. Parsons of the C & O Railroad in honor of his birthplace in St. Albans, Vermont, which is itself named after St. Albans in Hertfordshire, England. The latter town is named for St. Alban, believed to have been the first British Christian martyr.

== Geography ==
According to the United States Census Bureau, the city has a total area of 3.70 square miles (9.58 km^{2}), of which 3.62 square miles (9.38 km^{2}) is land and 0.08 square miles (0.21 km^{2}) is water.

== Demographics ==
Historical population
Census	Pop.	Note	%±
1900	816		—
1910	1,209		48.2%
1920	2,825		133.7%
1930	3,254		15.2%
1940	3,558		9.3%
1950	9,870		177.4%
1960	15,103		53.0%
1970	14,356		−4.9%
1980	12,402		−13.6%
1990	11,194		−9.7%
2000	11,567		3.3%
2010	11,044		−4.5%
2020	10,861		−1.7%
2021 (est.)	10,635		−2.1%
U.S. Decennial Census

=== 2020 census ===
As of the 2020 census, St. Albans had a population of 10,861. The median age was 45.3 years. 19.0% of residents were under the age of 18 and 23.6% of residents were 65 years of age or older. For every 100 females there were 91.0 males, and for every 100 females age 18 and over there were 86.9 males age 18 and over.

99.9% of residents lived in urban areas, while 0.1% lived in rural areas.

There were 4,940 households in St. Albans, of which 24.8% had children under the age of 18 living in them. Of all households, 40.7% were married-couple households, 18.4% were households with a male householder and no spouse or partner present, and 33.4% were households with a female householder and no spouse or partner present. About 34.5% of all households were made up of individuals and 17.6% had someone living alone who was 65 years of age or older.

There were 5,485 housing units, of which 9.9% were vacant. The homeowner vacancy rate was 2.9% and the rental vacancy rate was 10.3%.

Racial composition as of the 2020 census
Race	Number	Percent
White	9,587	88.3%
Black or African American	510	4.7%
American Indian and Alaska Native	27	0.2%
Asian	69	0.6%
Native Hawaiian and Other Pacific Islander	1	0.0%
Some other race	61	0.6%
Two or more races	606	5.6%
Hispanic or Latino (of any race)	183	1.7%

=== 2010 census ===
As of the census of 2010, there were 11,044 people, 4,969 households, and 3,073 families living in the city. The population density was 3,050.8 inhabitants per square mile (1,177.9/km^{2}). There were 5,436 housing units at an average density of 1,501.7 units per square mile (579.8 units/km^{2}). The racial makeup of the city was 94.0% White, 3.4% African American, 0.3% Native American, 0.5% Asian, 0.3% from other races, and 1.6% from two or more races. Hispanic or Latino of any race were 0.8% of the population.

There were 4,969 households, of which 25.7% had children under the age of 18 living with them, 45.4% were married couples living together, 12.1% had a female householder with no husband present, 4.3% had a male householder with no wife present, and 38.2% were non-families. 33.7% of all households were made up of individuals, and 16.5% had someone living alone who was 65 years of age or older. The average household size was 2.21 and the average family size was 2.79.

The median age in the city was 45 years. 19.5% of residents were under the age of 18; 6.5% were between the ages of 18 and 24; 23.9% were from 25 to 44; 29.4% were from 45 to 64; and 20.6% were 65 years of age or older. The gender makeup of the city was 46.9% male and 53.1% female.

=== 2000 census ===
As of the census of 2000, there were 11,567 people, 5,185 households, and 3,390 families living in the city. The population density was 3,196.0 people per square mile (1,234.0 people/km^{2}). There were 5,467 housing units at an average density of 1,510.5 units per square mile (583.2 units/km^{2}). The racial makeup of the city was 95.37% White, 2.84% African American, 0.13% Native American, 0.43% Asian, 0.18% from other races, and 1.05% from two or more races. Hispanic or Latino of any race were 0.63% of the population.

There were 5,185 households, out of which 23.5% had children under the age of 18 living with them, 51.6% were married couples living together, 10.6% had a female householder with no husband present, and 34.6% were non-families. 31.4% of all households were made up of individuals, and 17.1% had someone living alone who was 65 years of age or older. The average household size was 2.21 and the average family size was 2.75.

In the city, the population was spread out, with 19.2% under the age of 18, 6.8% from 18 to 24, 25.2% from 25 to 44, 25.2% from 45 to 64, and 23.6% who were 65 years of age or older. The median age was 44 years. For every 100 females, there were 85.6 males. For every 100 females age 18 and over, there were 81.5 males.

The median income for a household in the city was $37,130, and the median income for a family was $47,913. Males had a median income of $35,978 versus $25,030 for females. The per capita income for the city was $19,806. About 4.9% of families and 8.2% of the population were below the poverty line, including 12.3% of those under age 18 and 7.2% of those age 65 or over.

== Education ==
- Saint Albans High School (9–12)
- Hayes Middle School (6–8)
- Alban Elementary (K-5)
- Central Elementary (K-5)
- Anne Bailey Elementary (K-5)
- Lakewood Elementary (K-5)

== Infrastructure ==
=== Transportation ===
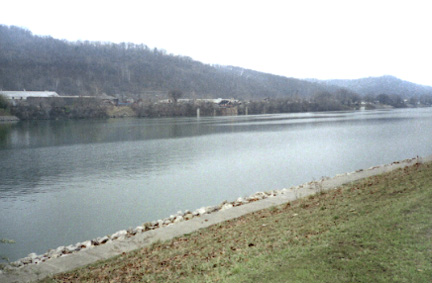
The Kanawha River in St. Albans as seen from Roadside Park on U.S. Route 60

==== Highways ====
- U.S. Route 60
- West Virginia Route 817

==== Bus ====
The Kanawha Valley is served by Kanawha Valley Regional Transportation Authority (KRT).

== Notable people ==
- Randy Barnes, Olympic shot putter, 1996 gold medalist
- Joe Chrest, actor, portrayed Ted Wheeler
- George E. Deatherage, political agitator and nationalist
- Renee Montgomery, former WNBA player who is currently a part-owner of the Atlanta Dream and the FCF Beasts
- Brett Nelson, American Basketball player and coach
- Jason Rader, American football player

== Notable places ==
- St. Albans Public Library (member of the Kanawha County Public Library System)
