= Fraziers Bottom, West Virginia =

Unincorporated community in West Virginia, United States

Fraziers Bottom
- Unincorporated community
- Frazier's Bottom
- Location within the state of West Virginia Fraziers Bottom (the United States)
- Coordinates: 38°34′13″N 81°59′26″W
- Country: United States
- State: West Virginia
- County: Putnam
- Elevation: 565 ft (172 m)

Population (2020)
  - Total: 1,720
- Time zone: UTC-5 (Eastern (EST))
  - Summer (DST): UTC-4 (EDT)
- ZIP codes: 25082
- GNIS feature ID: 1539239

Fraziers Bottom is an unincorporated community in Putnam County, West Virginia, United States. The community was named after a family of Fraziers, who settled the area in the late 18th century after migrating there from present day Virginia. The zip code is 25082. As of 2020, the population is 1,720 people.

== Cultural impact ==
The town was the setting for the film Win a Date with Tad Hamilton.
