= Bancroft, West Virginia =

- Town
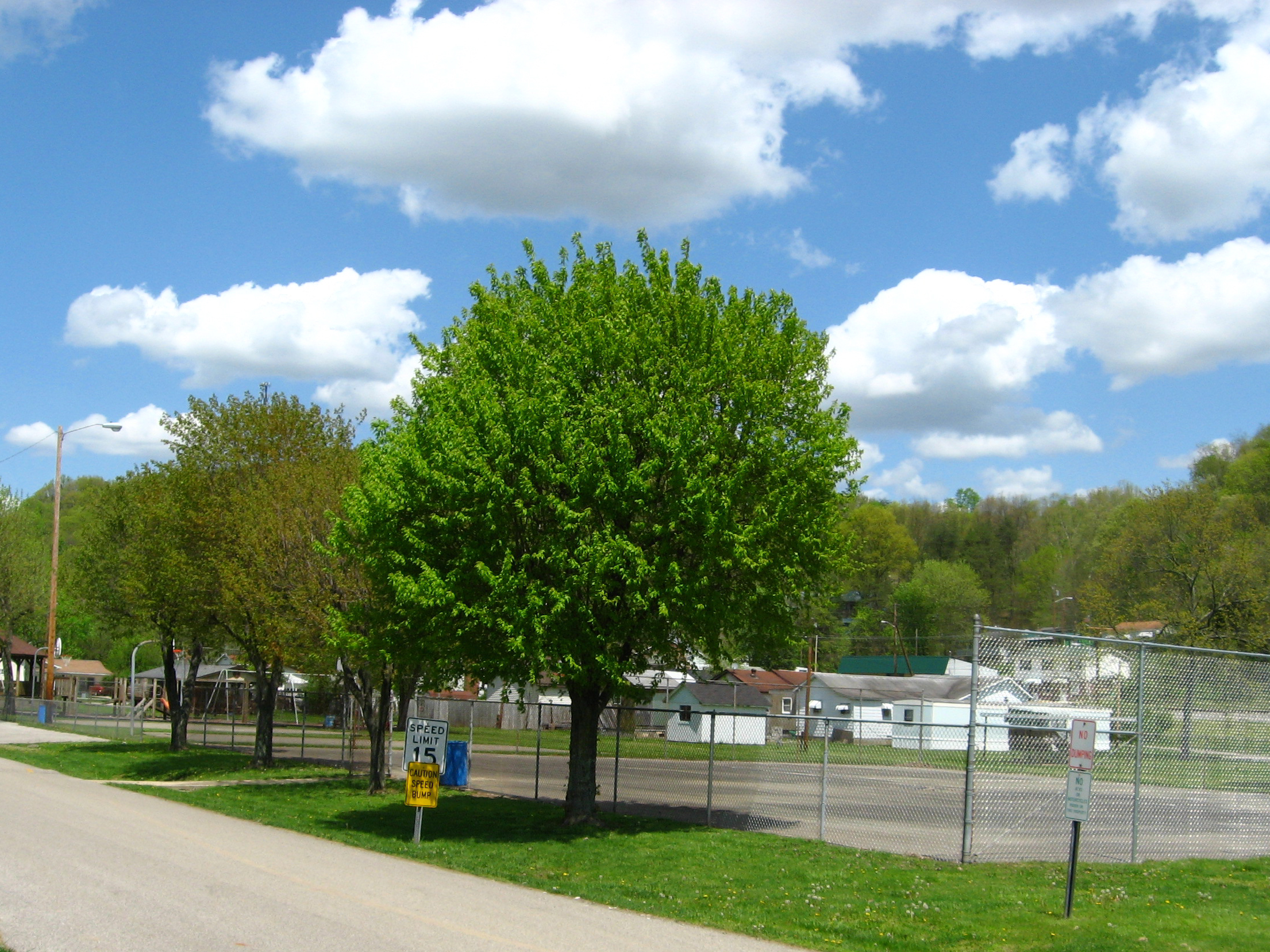
- Bancroft Community Park in the spring

- Seal

- Location of Bancroft in Putnam County, West Virginia.

- Location within West Virginia Location within the United States
- Coordinates: 38°30′39″N 81°50′30″W
- Country: United States
- State: West Virginia
- County: Putnam
- Incorporated: 1952

Government
  - Mayor: Donna McKneely

Area
  - Total: 0.15 sq mi (0.38 km^{2})
  - Land: 0.14 sq mi (0.36 km^{2})
  - Water: 0.0077 sq mi (0.02 km^{2})
- Elevation: 590 ft (180 m)

Population (2020)
  - Total: 387
  - Estimate (2021): 388
  - Density: 4,253.7/sq mi (1,642.37/km^{2})
- Time zone: UTC-5 (Eastern (EST))
  - Summer (DST): UTC-4 (EDT)
- ZIP code: 25011
- Area code: 304
- FIPS code: 54-04204
- GNIS feature ID: 1535197
- Website: bancroftwv.com

Bancroft is a town in Putnam County, West Virginia, United States, along the Kanawha River. The population was 389 at the 2020 census. It is part of the Huntington–Ashland metropolitan area.

== History ==
The town was named for George Bancroft, a coal mine operator. It officially became incorporated as a town in 1952.

== Geography ==
According to the United States Census Bureau, the town has a total area of 0.15 square miles (0.39 km^{2}), of which 0.14 square miles (0.36 km^{2}) is land and 0.01 square miles (0.03 km^{2}) is water.

== Demographics ==
Historical population
| Census | Pop. | Note | %± |
|---|---|---|---|
| 1960 | 469 | | — |
| 1970 | 446 | | −4.9% |
| 1980 | 528 | | 18.4% |
| 1990 | 381 | | −27.8% |
| 2000 | 367 | | −3.7% |
| 2010 | 587 | | 59.9% |
| 2020 | 387 | | −34.1% |
| 2021 (est.) | 388 | ▲ | 0.3% |

=== 2010 census ===
As of the census of 2010, there were 587 people, 240 households, and 170 families living in the town. The population density was 4,192.9 inhabitants per square mile (1,618.9/km^{2}). There were 256 housing units at an average density of 1,828.6 per square mile (706.0/km^{2}). The racial makeup of the town was 98.6% White, 0.2% Pacific Islander, 0.2% from other races, and 1.0% from two or more races. Hispanic or Latino of any race were 0.7% of the population.

There were 240 households, of which 30.0% had children under the age of 18 living with them, 54.2% were married couples living together, 10.8% had a female householder with no husband present, 5.8% had a male householder with no wife present, and 29.2% were non-families. 25.4% of all households were made up of individuals, and 9.6% had someone living alone who was 65 years of age or older. The average household size was 2.45 and the average family size was 2.88.

The median age in the town was 43.8 years. 21.1% of residents were under the age of 18; 6.4% were between the ages of 18 and 24; 23.7% were from 25 to 44; 33.4% were from 45 to 64; and 15.3% were 65 years of age or older. The gender makeup of the town was 50.3% male and 49.7% female.

=== 2000 census ===
As of the census of 2000, there were 367 people, 159 households, and 114 families living in the town. The population density was 2,597.6 inhabitants per square mile (1,012.1/km^{2}). There were 185 housing units at an average density of 1,309.4 per square mile (510.2/km^{2}). The racial makeup of the town was 100.00% White.

There were 159 households, out of which 24.5% had children under the age of 18 living with them, 59.1% were married couples living together, 11.3% had a female householder with no husband present, and 27.7% were non-families. 25.8% of all households were made up of individuals, and 10.7% had someone living alone who was 65 years of age or older. The average household size was 2.31 and the average family size was 2.75.

In the town, the population was spread out, with 20.4% under the age of 18, 7.4% from 18 to 24, 27.8% from 25 to 44, 33.2% from 45 to 64, and 11.2% who were 65 years of age or older. The median age was 42 years. For every 100 females, there were 87.2 males. For every 100 females age 18 and over, there were 86.0 males.

The median income for a household in the town was $28,833, and the median income for a family was $30,313. Males had a median income of $35,417 versus $20,417 for females. The per capita income for the town was $15,888. About 5.5% of families and 7.4% of the population were below the poverty line, including 10.5% of those under age 18 and none of those age 65 or over.
