= Putnam County, West Virginia =

County in West Virginia, United States

- County
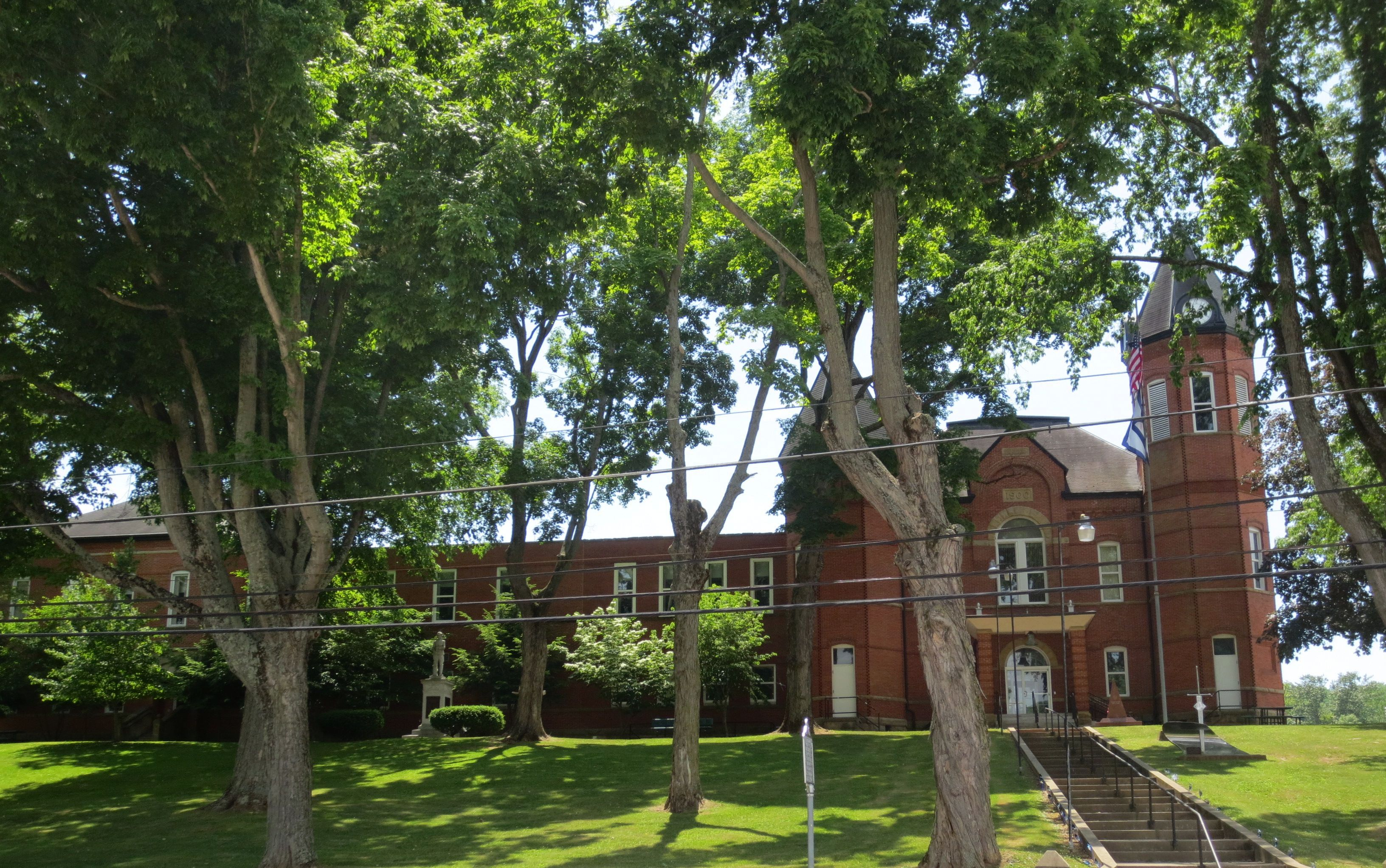
- Putnam County Courthouse in Winfield

- Location within the U.S. state of West Virginia
- Coordinates: 38°31′N 81°55′W
- Country: United States
- State: West Virginia
- Founded: March 11, 1848
- Named for: Israel Putnam
- Seat: Winfield
- Largest city: Hurricane

Area
  - Total: 350 sq mi (910 km^{2})
  - Land: 346 sq mi (900 km^{2})
  - Water: 4.7 sq mi (12 km^{2}) 1.3%

Population (2020)
  - Total: 57,440
  - Estimate (2025): 56,885 ▼
  - Density: 166/sq mi (64.1/km^{2})
- Time zone: UTC−5 (Eastern)
  - Summer (DST): UTC−4 (EDT)
- Congressional district: 2nd
- Website: putnamcountywv.gov

Putnam County is a county in the U.S. state of West Virginia. As of the 2020 census, its population was 57,440. Its county seat is Winfield, its largest incorporated city is Hurricane, and its largest community is the census-designated place of Teays Valley. Putnam County is part of the Huntington–Ashland, WV-KY-OH metropolitan statistical area, across the Kanawha River from Charleston, West Virginia.

== History ==
The Virginia General Assembly formed Putnam County on March 11, 1848, from parts of Cabell, Kanawha, and Mason Counties. It was named for Israel Putnam, who was a hero in the French and Indian War and a general in the American Revolutionary War. George Washington surveyed the area in 1770. Winfield, the county seat, had been founded in 1818, but was incorporated on February 21, 1868, and named to honor General Winfield Scott, a general during the Mexican American War and the early stage of the Civil War.

Slavery was a divisive issue in Putnam County before and during the Civil War. In the Virginia Secession Convention of 1861, Putnam County voters elected James W. Hoge to represent them, and he voted against secession on April 17, 1861, when the convention passed the secession ordinance. He returned to Richmond for the second session in June, though, and signed the ordinance. No one from Putnam County attended the Wheeling Convention, which ultimately led to the creation of the state of West Virginia in 1863.

Two minor battles were fought in Putnam County during the Civil War. On July 17, 1861, Confederate soldiers defeated a Union force at the Battle of Scary Creek, before withdrawing to Charleston. The Confederates included a cavalry troop raised by Colonel Albert Gallatin Jenkins, who until Virginia's secession from the Union, had represented the area in Congress. Jenkins was commissioned a brigadier general in 1862, but died of wounds received at the Battle of Cloyd's Mountain in May 1864. The second skirmish occurred on October 24, 1864, after West Virginia became a Union state. Confederate troops seized and sank a Union steamboat on the Kanawha River near Winfield, then attacked the courthouse, but the "Battle of Winfield" ended as a Union victory. Putnam County's Civil War soldiers were about evenly split between Union and Confederate, with about four hundred on each side.

Putnam County was one of 50 Virginia counties admitted to the Union as the state of West Virginia on June 20, 1863. Later that year, its counties were divided into civil townships, with the intention of encouraging local government. This proved impractical in the heavily rural state, and in 1872, the townships were converted into magisterial districts. Putnam County was initially divided into six townships: Buffalo, Curry, Grant, Hutton, Scott, and Union. These became magisterial districts in 1872, and the following year, two were renamed, with Grant becoming Teays Valley, while Hutton became Pocatalico. Except for minor adjustments, these districts were largely unchanged until the 1980s, when Buffalo and Union Districts were consolidated into Buffalo-Union District, and Teays Valley's name abbreviated to "Teays".

A railroad was rebuilt through Putnam County in 1875.

== Geography ==
The Kanawha River flows north-northwestward through the center of Putnam County. The county terrain consists of wooded hills, carved with drainages. The terrain slopes to the north, with the highest point near its southwest corner at 1,129 ft (344 m) above mean sea level. The county has a total area of 350 square miles (910 km^{2}), of which 4.7 square miles (12 km^{2}) (1.3%) are covered by water.

=== Major highways ===
- Interstate 64
- U.S. Route 35
- U.S. Route 60
- West Virginia Route 25
- West Virginia Route 34
- West Virginia Route 62
- West Virginia Route 817
- West Virginia Route 869

=== Adjacent counties ===
- Mason County - north
- Jackson County - northeast
- Kanawha County - east
- Lincoln County - south
- Cabell County - west

== Demographics ==
Historical population
Census	Pop.	Note	%±
1850	5,335		—
1860	6,301		18.1%
1870	7,794		23.7%
1880	11,375		45.9%
1890	14,342		26.1%
1900	17,330		20.8%
1910	18,587		7.3%
1920	17,531		−5.7%
1930	16,737		−4.5%
1940	19,511		16.6%
1950	21,021		7.7%
1960	23,561		12.1%
1970	27,625		17.2%
1980	38,181		38.2%
1990	42,835		12.2%
2000	51,589		20.4%
2010	55,486		7.6%
2020	57,440		3.5%
2025 (est.)	56,885	▼	−1.0%
U.S. Decennial Census; 1790–1960 1900–1990; 1990–2000 2010–2020

=== 2020 census ===
As of the 2020 census, the county had a population of 57,440. Of the residents, 22.6% were under the age of 18 and 19.1% were 65 years of age or older; the median age was 42.4 years. For every 100 females there were 96.3 males, and for every 100 females age 18 and over there were 94.1 males.

The racial makeup of the county was 92.9% White, 1.1% Black or African American, 0.2% American Indian and Alaska Native, 1.0% Asian, 0.7% from some other race, and 4.1% from two or more races. Hispanic or Latino residents of any race comprised 1.4% of the population.

There were 22,936 households in the county, of which 31.3% had children under the age of 18 living with them and 23.5% had a female householder with no spouse or partner present. About 25.2% of all households were made up of individuals and 12.1% had someone living alone who was 65 years of age or older.

There were 24,795 housing units, of which 7.5% were vacant. Among occupied housing units, 80.4% were owner-occupied and 19.6% were renter-occupied. The homeowner vacancy rate was 1.6% and the rental vacancy rate was 9.0%.

Putnam County, West Virginia – Racial and ethnic composition Note: the US Census treats Hispanic/Latino as an ethnic category. This table excludes Latinos from the racial categories and assigns them to a separate category. Hispanics/Latinos may be of any race.
Race / Ethnicity (NH = Non-Hispanic)	Pop 2000	Pop 2010	Pop 2020	% 2000	% 2010	% 2020
White alone (NH)	50,361	53,377	53,139	97.62%	96.20%	92.51%
Black or African American alone (NH)	287	478	646	0.56%	0.86%	1.12%
Native American or Alaska Native alone (NH)	78	115	81	0.15%	0.21%	0.14%
Asian alone (NH)	296	409	577	0.57%	0.74%	1.00%
Pacific Islander alone (NH)	11	24	7	0.02%	0.04%	0.01%
Other race alone (NH)	15	37	152	0.03%	0.07%	0.26%
Mixed race or Multiracial (NH)	279	562	2,027	0.54%	1.01%	3.53%
Hispanic or Latino (any race)	262	484	811	0.51%	0.87%	1.41%
Total	51,589	55,486	57,440	100.00%	100.00%	100.00%

=== 2010 census ===
As of the census of 2010, 55,486 people, 21,981 households, and 16,176 families resided in the county. The population density was 160 people per square mile (62 people/km^{2}). The 23,438 housing units had an average density of 67.7 units per square mile (26.1 units/km^{2}). The racial makeup of the county was 96.8% White, 0.9% Black or African American, 0.7% Asian, 0.2% American Indian, 0.3% from other races, and 1.1% from two or more races. Those of Hispanic or Latino origin made up 0.9% of the population. In terms of ancestry, 13.2% were American, 12.9% were German, 11.3% were English, and 10.6% were Irish.

Of the 21,981 households, 33.6% had children under 18 living with them, 59.6% were married couples living together, 9.5% had a female householder with no husband present, 26.4% were not families, and 22.3% of all households were made up of individuals. The average household size was 2.51 and the average family size was 2.93. The median age was 40.9 years.

The median income for a household in the county was $52,618 and for a family was $63,642. Males had a median income of $51,837 versus $31,198 for females. The per capita income for the county was $25,857. About 8.5% of families and 10.4% of the population were below the poverty line, including 15.6% of those under 18 and 6.5% of those 65 or over.

=== 2000 census ===
As of the census of 2000, 51,589 people, 20,028 households, and 15,281 families lived in the county. The population density was 149 people per square mile (58 people/km^{2}). The 21,621 housing units had an average density of 62.5 units per square mile (24.1 units/km^{2}). The racial makeup of the county was 97.97% White, 0.56% Black or African American, 0.16% Native American, 0.58% Asian, 0.02% Pacific Islander, 0.13% from other races, and 0.59% from two or more races. About 0.51% of the population were Hispanics or Latinos of any race.

Of the 20,028 households, 35.4% had children under 18 living with them, 64.2% were married couples living together, 8.9% had a female householder with no husband present, and 23.7% were not families. Around 20.6% of all households were made up of individuals, and 7.9% had someone living alone who was 65or older. The average household size was 2.56 and the average family size was 2.96.

The county age distribution was 25.0% under 18, 7.6% from 18 to 24, 30.4% from 25 to 44, 25.5% from 45 to 64, and 11.6% who were 65 or older. The median age was 38 years. For every 100 females, there were 96.7 males. For every 100 females 18 and over, there were 93.5 males.

The median income for a household in the county was $41,892, and for a family was $48,674. Males had a median income of $40,782 versus $23,532 for females. The per capita income for the county was $20,471. About 7.1% of families and 9.3% of the population were below the poverty line, including 11.3% of those under 18 and 7.6% of those 65 or over.

== Politics ==
Putnam County voters have traditionally voted Republican. In only one national election since 1964 has the county selected the Democratic candidate.

United States presidential election results for Putnam County, West Virginia
Year	Republican		Democratic		Third party(ies)	
Year	No.	%	No.	%	No.	%
1912	531	13.98%	1,540	40.55%	1,727	45.47%
1916	1,925	49.45%	1,837	47.19%	131	3.37%
1920	3,223	54.49%	2,578	43.58%	114	1.93%
1924	2,862	46.74%	2,946	48.11%	315	5.14%
1928	3,346	57.76%	2,406	41.53%	41	0.71%
1932	3,411	44.94%	4,098	53.99%	81	1.07%
1936	3,938	45.16%	4,756	54.54%	26	0.30%
1940	4,268	46.61%	4,888	53.39%	0	0.00%
1944	4,025	50.67%	3,918	49.33%	0	0.00%
1948	3,722	45.59%	4,426	54.21%	16	0.20%
1952	4,944	50.73%	4,802	49.27%	0	0.00%
1956	5,560	53.91%	4,754	46.09%	0	0.00%
1960	5,702	53.44%	4,968	46.56%	0	0.00%
1964	4,165	37.61%	6,910	62.39%	0	0.00%
1968	5,252	45.27%	5,009	43.18%	1,340	11.55%
1972	8,265	63.40%	4,771	36.60%	0	0.00%
1976	6,334	43.50%	8,226	56.50%	0	0.00%
1980	7,561	51.48%	6,409	43.64%	716	4.88%
1984	9,238	63.75%	5,208	35.94%	46	0.32%
1988	8,163	55.00%	6,640	44.74%	38	0.26%
1992	7,653	43.91%	6,817	39.12%	2,958	16.97%
1996	8,803	46.80%	8,029	42.69%	1,977	10.51%
2000	12,173	59.60%	7,891	38.63%	362	1.77%
2004	15,716	62.49%	9,301	36.98%	134	0.53%
2008	15,162	60.92%	9,334	37.51%	391	1.57%
2012	16,032	67.47%	7,256	30.54%	472	1.99%
2016	17,788	70.56%	5,884	23.34%	1,539	6.10%
2020	20,034	70.29%	7,878	27.64%	589	2.07%
2024	19,868	72.23%	7,124	25.90%	515	1.87%

== Notable people ==
- Michael Barber, a former American football wide receiver, played high-school football at Winfield and college football at Marshall University. He was inducted into the College Football Hall of Fame in 2005. Drafted in the fourth round (pick 112) by the San Francisco 49ers, he went on to play four seasons in the NFL. He was inducted into the West Virginia Sports Hall of Fame in 2020.
- Frank Clayton Bowyer, born in Teays Valley, was an American businessman who served as mayor of Tampa, Florida, from June 1898 to June 1900. He was a Democrat.
- Virginia Mae Brown, born in Pliny, was a civil servant, government official, and lawyer. She was West Virginia's first female assistant attorney general. She was later the first female to hold the position of West Virginia's insurance commissioner. President Lyndon B. Johnson appointed Brown a member of the Interstate Commerce Commission, the first female since its inception in 1887, and later promoted her to be its first female chair.
- Samuel Simon Gordon, a native of Fraziers Bottom, West Virginia, was an American Negro League first baseman between 1908 and 1913.
- Kathie Hess Crouse is an American politician and activist serving as a member of the West Virginia House of Delegates from the 13th district, which includes part of Putnam County. Her family and she live in Buffalo.
- Minnie Buckingham Harper, born in Winfield, was an American politician and housewife. In 1928, she became the first Black woman legislator in the United States.
- Samantha Jane Atkeson Morgan, born in Buffalo (then Virginia), was a painter.

== Communities ==
=== Cities ===
- Hurricane
- Nitro (part)
- Winfield (county seat)

=== Towns ===
- Bancroft
- Buffalo
- Eleanor
- Poca

=== Magisterial districts ===
- Buffalo-Union
- Curry
- Pocatalico
- Scott
- Teays

=== Census-designated places ===
- Culloden (part)
- Hometown
- Raymond City
- Teays Valley

=== Unincorporated communities ===
- Black Betsy
- Confidence
- Extra
- Fraziers Bottom
- Lanham
- Liberty
- Midway
- Pliny
- Plymouth
- Red House
- Robertsburg
- Scary
- Scott Depot
- Teays

== See also ==
- Putnam County Schools
- Amherst-Plymouth Wildlife Management Area
- National Register of Historic Places listings in Putnam County, West Virginia
