= Buffalo, West Virginia =

- Town
- Seal

- Location of Buffalo in Putnam County, West Virginia.

- Location within West Virginia Location within the United States
- Coordinates: 38°37′1″N 81°58′48″W
- Country: United States
- State: West Virginia
- County: Putnam

Government
  - Mayor: Conrad Cain

Area
  - Total: 1.64 sq mi (4.26 km^{2})
  - Land: 1.40 sq mi (3.63 km^{2})
  - Water: 0.25 sq mi (0.64 km^{2})
- Elevation: 568 ft (173 m)

Population (2020)
  - Total: 1,211
  - Estimate (2021): 1,208
  - Density: 900.1/sq mi (347.52/km^{2})
- Time zone: UTC-5 (Eastern (EST))
  - Summer (DST): UTC-4 (EDT)
- ZIP code: 25033
- Area code: 304
- FIPS code: 54-11284
- GNIS feature ID: 1536615
- Website: buffalo.wv.gov

Buffalo is a town in Putnam County, West Virginia, United States, located along the Kanawha River. The population was 1,211 at the time of the 2020 census It is part of the Huntington–Ashland metropolitan area.

== History ==
Along with numerous sites in the Kanawha River Valley, Buffalo was originally settled by waves of ancient cultures of prehistoric indigenous peoples. Clovis points indicate the presence of inhabitants more than 10,000 years ago. One of the last cultures, that of the Fort Ancient people, had a few villages such as Buffalo and Marmet that survived into the time of European exploration.

Historic tribes such as the Huron, from the Great Lakes region, and the Conoy (also spelled Conois and Kanawha) were driven out of the central valley by the Iroquois' invading from their base in present-day Western New York. Many of the Conoy by the early 17th century had resettled on the west side of the Chesapeake Bay and below the Potomac River. After decades of encroachment by English colonists, surviving Conoy (also called Piscataway by then) went north to Pennsylvania and allied with the Susquehannock and Iroquois.

The town was named after the American buffalo which once roamed here.

== Geography ==
Buffalo is located at 38°37′1″N 81°58′48″W (38.616994, -81.979938).

According to the United States Census Bureau, the town has a total area of 1.65 square miles (4.27 km^{2}), of which 1.40 square miles (3.63 km^{2}) is land and 0.25 square miles (0.65 km^{2}) is water.

== Demographics ==
Historical population
Census	Pop.	Note	%±
1860	268		—
1870	321		19.8%
1880	351		9.3%
1890	238		−32.2%
1900	364		52.9%
1910	384		5.5%
1920	300		−21.9%
1930	316		5.3%
1940	338		7.0%
1950	333		−1.5%
1960	396		18.9%
1970	831		109.8%
1980	1,034		24.4%
1990	969		−6.3%
2000	1,171		20.8%
2010	1,236		5.6%
2020	1,211		−2.0%
2021 (est.)	1,208	▼	−0.2%

=== 2010 census ===
As of the census of 2010, there were 1,236 people, 518 households, and 344 families living in the town. The population density was 882.9 inhabitants per square mile (340.9/km^{2}). There were 568 housing units at an average density of 405.7 per square mile (156.6/km^{2}). The racial makeup of the town was 97.4% White, 0.5% African American, 0.2% Native American, 0.4% Asian, 0.4% from other races, and 1.1% from two or more races. Hispanic or Latino of any race were 0.7% of the population.

There were 518 households, of which 28.4% had children under the age of 18 living with them, 51.2% were married couples living together, 9.8% had a female householder with no spouse present, 5.4% had a male householder with no spouse present, and 33.6% were non-families. 28.2% of all households were made up of individuals, and 12.8% had someone living alone who was 65 years of age or older. The average household size was 2.36 and the average family size was 2.89.

The median age in the town was 42.8 years. 21% of residents were under the age of 18; 8.1% were between the ages of 18 and 24; 24.5% were from 25 to 44; 28.7% were from 45 to 64; and 17.7% were 65 years of age or older. The gender makeup of the town was 49.8% male and 50.2% female.

=== 2000 census ===
As of the census of 2000, there were 1,171 people, 490 households, and 338 families residing in Buffalo. The population density was 828.4 inhabitants per square mile (320.7/km^{2}). There were 559 housing units at an average density of 395.4 per square mile (153.1/km^{2}). The racial makeup of the town was 97.18% White, 0.09% African American, 0.17% Native American, 0.17% Asian, and 2.39% from two or more races. Hispanic or Latino of any race were 0.94% of the population.

There were 490 households, out of which 28.0% had children under the age of 18 living with them, 53.9% were married couples living together, 10.4% had a female householder with no marital partner present, and 31.0% were non-families. 28.4% of all households were made up of individuals, and 13.5% had someone living alone who was 65 years of age or older. The average household size was 2.37 and the average family size was 2.91.

In the town, the population was spread out, with 22.0% under the age of 18, 7.7% from 18 to 24, 28.6% from 25 to 44, 27.1% from 45 to 64, and 14.6% who were 65 years of age or older. The median age was 39 years. For every 100 females, there were 94.2 males. For every 100 females age 18 and over, there were 94.7 males.

The median income for a household in the town was $26,481, and the median income for a family was $35,938. Males had a median income of $29,519 versus $16,106 for females. The per capita income for the town was $14,005. About 12.8% of families and 17.6% of the population were below the poverty line, including 24.1% of those under age 18 and 12.3% of those age 65 or over.

== Economy ==
Toyota Motor Manufacturing West Virginia, covering over one million square feet, is located in Buffalo. The plant solely manufacturers automobile engines and transmissions.

== Notable people ==
- Virginia Mae Brown, civil servant and lawyer
- Kathie Hess Crouse, member of the West Virginia House of Delegates
- William Hope Harvey, lawyer, author, politician, and businessman
