= West Virginia Route 62 =

State highway in West Virginia, United States

West Virginia Route 62
- WV 62 highlighted in red

Route information
- Maintained by WVDOH
- Length: 100.83 mi (162.27 km)

Major junctions
- South end: WV 25 in Dunbar
- WV 2 near Point Pleasant; WV 2 near Millwood
- North end: I-77 / US 33 in Ripley

Location
- Country: United States
- State: West Virginia
- Counties: Kanawha, Putnam, Mason, Jackson

Highway system
- West Virginia State Highway System; Interstate; US; State
← WV 61	→ WV 63

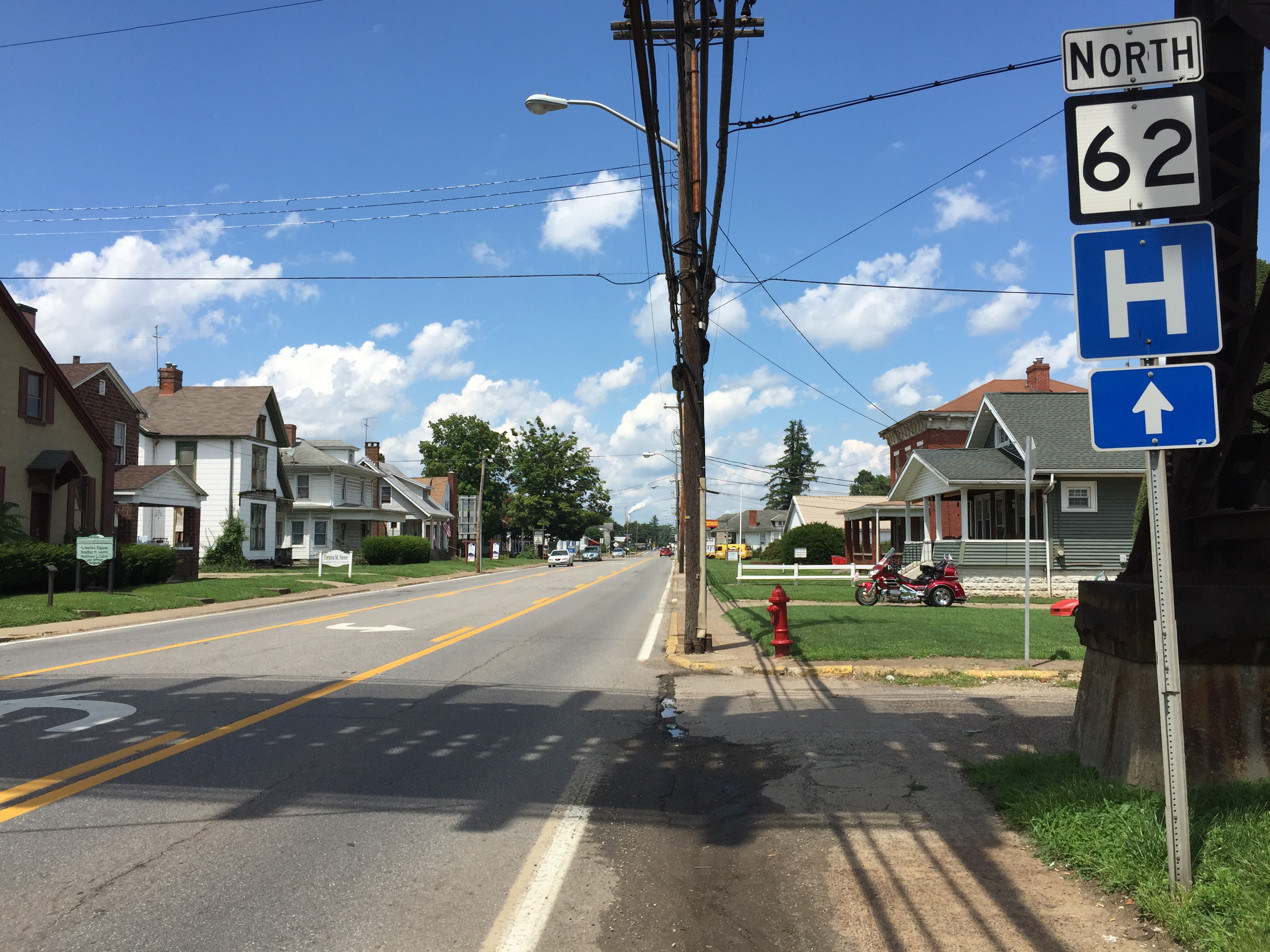
View north along WV 62 in Point Pleasant

West Virginia Route 62 is a north–south state highway in western West Virginia. The southern terminus of the route is at West Virginia Route 25 in Dunbar. The northern terminus is at Interstate 77 and U.S. Route 33 in Ripley.

== History ==
In the 1920s, WV 62 was designated West Virginia Route 19.

Up until the late 1960s, WV 62 was designated as U.S. Route 35 from Dunbar to Point Pleasant, crossing the Silver Bridge into Gallipolis, Ohio. After the Silver Bridge collapsed in 1967 (necessitating the building of a new bridge, the Silver Memorial Bridge—finished in 1969), US 35 was moved to the south bank (replacing the former WV 17) of the Kanawha River and US 35's previous route was designated as WV 62.

In December 2003, WV 62 was extended northward (but geographically southeastward) along then-US 33 from its former northern terminus at US 33 in Mason to Ripley. Sometimes WV 62 is referred to as "Believe It Or Not Highway" because it actually goes south when it's signed as "north" going toward Ripley from Mason, and vice versa.

== Major intersections ==
County	Location	mi	km	Destinations	Notes
Kanawha	Charleston–Dunbar line			WV 25	
Kanawha	Tyler Mountain			WV 501 north to WV 622	
Kanawha	Cross Lanes			WV 622 to I-64 – Institute, Sissonville	
Putnam	Poca			WV 25 east to I-64	
Putnam	Red House			WV 34 north	South end of WV 34 overlap
Putnam				WV 34 south to US 35 – Winfield	North end of WV 34 overlap; to Winfield Toll Bridge
Putnam				To I-64 / US 35 (via WV 869) – Point Pleasant, Charleston	To Lower Buffalo Bridge
Mason				WV 2 north – Ravenswood	South end of WV 2 overlap
Mason	Point Pleasant			WV 2 south to US 35 – Huntington	North end of WV 2 overlap
Mason	Point Pleasant			To Viand Street south / WV 2 / US 35 – Huntington	
Mason	Mason			SR 833 north (Pomeroy-Mason Bridge) – Pomeroy	
Jackson	Mount Alto			WV 2 south / WV 331 east – Cottageville, Point Pleasant	South end of WV 2 overlap
Jackson				WV 2 north – Ravenswood	North end of WV 2 overlap
Jackson				WV 331 west / CR 33/17 (Conrad Hill Road) – Cottageville	
Jackson				WV 87 west – Evans	
Jackson	Ripley			I-77 / US 33 – Parkersburg, Charleston	I-77 exit 138
1.000 mi = 1.609 km; 1.000 km = 0.621 mi: Concurrency terminus

== West Virginia Route Spur 62 ==
WV Spur 62 connects WV 62 to Ohio State Route 833 via the Pomeroy–Mason Bridge. As of September 2007, Spur 62 is signposted as part of Ohio State Route 833.
