= Poca, West Virginia =

- Town
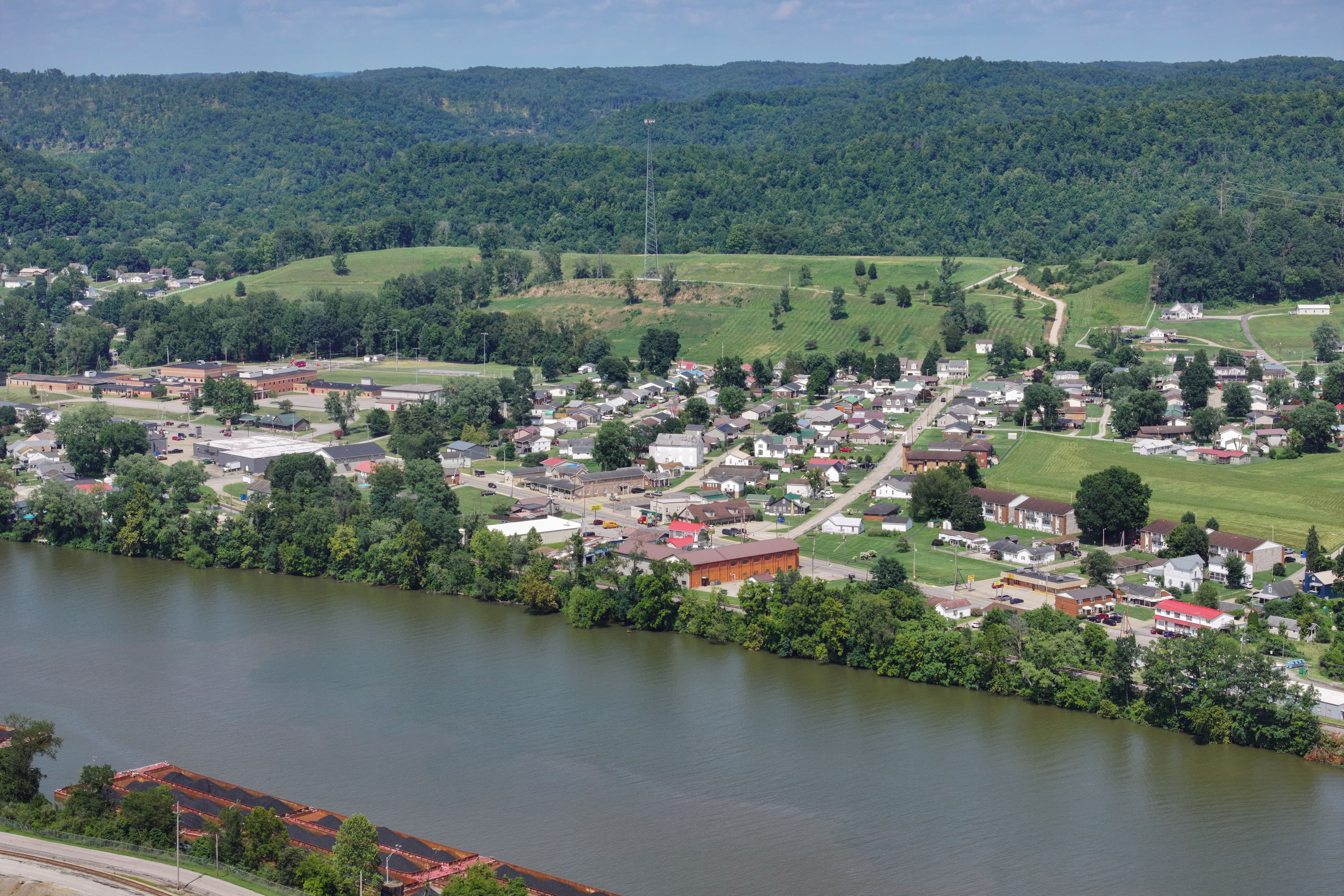
- Poca in 2026

- Location of Poca in Putnam County, West Virginia.

- Location within West Virginia Location within the United States
- Coordinates: 38°27′41″N 81°48′56″W
- Country: United States
- State: West Virginia
- County: Putnam
- Incorporated: February 1958

Government
  - Mayor: Joshua Silman

Area
  - Total: 0.75 sq mi (1.95 km^{2})
  - Land: 0.59 sq mi (1.52 km^{2})
  - Water: 0.17 sq mi (0.43 km^{2})
- Elevation: 587 ft (179 m)

Population (2020)
  - Total: 874
  - Estimate (2021): 873
  - Density: 1,659.5/sq mi (640.75/km^{2})
- Time zone: UTC-5 (Eastern (EST))
  - Summer (DST): UTC-4 (EDT)
- ZIP code: 25159
- Area code: 304
- FIPS code: 54-64516
- GNIS feature ID: 1555379
- Website: local.wv.gov/poca/Pages/default.aspx

Poca is a town in Putnam County, West Virginia, United States. The population was 875 at the 2020 census. It is part of the Huntington–Ashland metropolitan area. The town derives its name from the Pocatalico River.

== Geography ==
Poca is located at 38°27′41″N 81°48′56″W (38.461343, -81.815592). It is sited at the confluence of the Kanawha River and the Pocatalico River.

According to the United States Census Bureau, the town has a total area of 0.76 square miles (1.97 km^{2}), of which 0.59 square miles (1.53 km^{2}) is land and 0.17 square miles (0.44 km^{2}) is water.

== Demographics ==
Historical population
Census	Pop.	Note	%±
1880	145		—
1890	284		95.9%
1960	607		—
1970	772		27.2%
1980	1,142		47.9%
1990	1,124		−1.6%
2000	1,013		−9.9%
2010	974		−3.8%
2020	874		−10.3%
2021 (est.)	873	▼	−0.1%
U.S. Decennial Census

=== 2010 census ===
As of the census of 2010, there were 974 people, 395 households, and 290 families living in the town. The population density was 1,650.8 inhabitants per square mile (637.4/km^{2}). There were 415 housing units at an average density of 703.4 per square mile (271.6/km^{2}). The racial makeup of the town was 98.7% White, 0.5% African American, 0.2% Asian, and 0.6% from two or more races. Hispanic or Latino of any race were 0.6% of the population.

There were 395 households, of which 28.9% had children under the age of 18 living with them, 58.2% were married couples living together, 10.1% had a female householder with no husband present, 5.1% had a male householder with no wife present, and 26.6% were non-families. 24.1% of all households were made up of individuals, and 11.2% had someone living alone who was 65 years of age or older. The average household size was 2.45 and the average family size was 2.86.

The median age in the town was 42.9 years. 21.6% of residents were under the age of 18; 7.2% were between the ages of 18 and 24; 24.3% were from 25 to 44; 28% were from 45 to 64; and 18.9% were 65 years of age or older. The gender makeup of the town was 48.5% male and 51.5% female.

=== 2000 census ===
As of the census of 2000, there were 1,013 people, 404 households, and 311 families living in the town. The population density was 1,806.2 inhabitants per square mile (698.4/km^{2}). There were 430 housing units at an average density of 766.7 per square mile (296.5/km^{2}). The racial makeup of the town was 97.24% White, 1.09% African American, 0.49% Native American, and 1.18% from two or more races. Hispanic or Latino of any race were 0.49% of the population.

There were 404 households, out of which 34.4% had children that were under the age of 18 living with them, 61.9% were married couples living together, 11.6% had a female householder with no husband present, and 23.0% were non-families. 21.3% of all households were made up of individuals, and 7.2% had someone living alone who was 65 years of age or older. The average household size was 2.51 and the average family size was 2.86.

In the town, the population was spread out, with 23.5% under the age of 18, 8.6% from 18 to 24, 27.2% from 25 to 44, 27.2% from 45 to 64, and 13.4% who were 65 years of age or older. The median age was 38 years. For every 100 females, there were 93.3 males. For every 100 females age 18 and over, there were 89.0 males.

The median income for a household in the town was $42,273, and the median income for a family was $49,500. Males had a median income of $39,306 versus $20,536 for females. The per capita income for the town was $19,108. About 9.2% of families and 12.0% of the population were below the poverty line, including 19.1% of those under age 18 and 2.5% of those age 65 or over.

== Culture ==
Poca is memorialized in a series of art stamps and related stories created by West Virginian artist Ben Mahmoud, featuring humorous fictional stories on aspects of history.
