= List of African-American historic places in West Virginia =

This is intended to be a complete list of the African American historic places in West Virginia. The locations and districts for which the latitude and longitude coordinates are included below, may be seen in a Google map.

| Color | Denotes |
|---|---|
| NRHP listing | National Register of Historic Places listing |
| NRHP HD | National Register Historic District |
| Not listed on the NRHP | Not listed on the National Register |

Contents: Counties in West Virginia with African American Historic Places
Berkeley - Cabell - Fayette - Hampshire - Harrison - Jefferson - Kanawha - Lewis - McDowell - Mercer - Monongalia - Pocahontas - Preston - Wood

== Berkeley County ==
| | Name on the Register | Image | Date listed | Location | City or town | Description |
|---|---|---|---|---|---|---|
| 1 | Mt. Pleasant School | Mt. Pleasant School | September 18, 2008 (#08000928) | Abiding Way; 39°21′49″N 78°07′28″W | Gerrardstown | |

== Cabell County ==
| | Name on the Register | Image | Date listed | Location | City or town | Description |
|---|---|---|---|---|---|---|
| 1 | Barnett Hospital and Nursing School | Barnett Hospital and Nursing School | December 30, 2009 (#09001190) | 1201 7th Ave. 38°25′03″N 82°26′15″W | Huntington | |
| 2 | Douglass Junior and Senior High School | Douglass Junior and Senior High School | December 5, 1985 (#85003091) | 10th Ave. and Bruce St. 38°24′52″N 82°25′53″W | Huntington | |
| 3 | West Virginia Colored Children's Home | West Virginia Colored Children's Home | November 13, 1997 (#97001413) | 3353 U.S. Route 60; 38°24′34″N 82°22′25″W | Huntington | Demolished on May 5, 2011 to make room for a new middle school. |

== Fayette County ==
| | Name on the Register | Image | Date listed | Location | City or town | Description |
|---|---|---|---|---|---|---|
| 1 | Camp Washington-Carver Complex | Camp Washington-Carver Complex | June 20, 1980 (#80004017) | County Route 11/3; 38°00′36″N 80°58′14″W | Clifftop | |

== Hampshire County ==
| | Name on the Register | Image | Date listed | Location | City or town | Description |
|---|---|---|---|---|---|---|
| 1 | Mount Pisgah Benevolence Cemetery | Mount Pisgah Benevolence Cemetery | Not listed (#unlisted) | Along U.S. Route 50; 39°20′30″N 78°46′04″W | Romney | |
| 2 | Mount Pisgah United Methodist Church | | Not listed (#unlisted) | 239 North High Street (West Virginia Route 28); 39°20′40″N 78°45′20″W | Romney | |
| 3 | Washington Place | Washington Place | Not listed (#unlisted) | Along West Virginia Route 28; 39°21′14″N 78°45′09″W | Romney | |

== Harrison County ==
| | Name on the Register | Image | Date listed | Location | City or town | Description |
|---|---|---|---|---|---|---|
| 1 | Kelly Miller High School | | Not listed (#unlisted) | E. B. Saunders Way; 39°16′36″N 80°20′09″W | Clarksburg | |

== Jefferson County ==
| | Name on the Register | Image | Date listed | Location | City or town | Description |
|---|---|---|---|---|---|---|
| 1 | Halltown Colored Free School | Halltown Colored Free School | August 25, 2004 (#04000912) | Halltown Rd., 0.5 mi (0.80 km) northeast of U.S. Route 340; 39°18′44″N 77°48′06″W | Halltown | |
| 2 | Halltown Union Colored Sunday School | Halltown Union Colored Sunday School | January 12, 1984 (#84003591) | Off U.S. Route 340; 39°18′34″N 77°48′11″W | Halltown | |
| 3 | Storer College | Storer College | October 15, 1966 (#66000041) | Contributing property to Harpers Ferry National Historical Park NRHP listing 39°19′26″N 77°44′07″W | Harpers Ferry | |

== Kanawha County ==
| | Name on the Register | Image | Date listed | Location | City or town | Description |
|---|---|---|---|---|---|---|
| 1 | African Zion Baptist Church | African Zion Baptist Church | December 27, 1974 (#74002010) | 4104 Malden Dr. 38°17′58″N 81°33′26″W | Malden | |
| 2 | Booker T. Washington High School | Booker T. Washington High School | December 3, 1999 (#99001399) | Wyatt St. off U.S. Route 60; 38°12′04″N 81°22′17″W | London | |
| 3 | Booker T. Washington State Park | Booker T. Washington State Park | Not listed (#unlisted) | Northern terminus of Pinewood Drive; 38°22′55″N 81°44′53″W | Institute | |
| 4 | Canty House | Canty House | September 23, 1988 (#88001587) | WV 25; 38°22′57″N 81°45′48″W | Institute | |
| 5 | East Hall | East Hall | September 26, 1988 (#88001585) | West Quadrangle, West Virginia State University; 38°22′44″N 81°46′07″W | Institute | |
| 6 | Garnet High School | Garnet High School | July 24, 1990 (#90001068) | 422 Dickinson St. 38°21′04″N 81°37′48″W | Charleston | |
| 7 | Elizabeth Harden Gilmore House | Elizabeth Harden Gilmore House | September 17, 1988 (#88001462) | 514 Broad St. (now Leon Sullivan Way); 38°21′03″N 81°37′39″W | Charleston | |
| 8 | Mattie V. Lee Home | Mattie V. Lee Home | June 16, 1992 (#92000303) | 810 Donnally St. 38°21′06″N 81°37′51″W | Charleston | |
| 9 | Simpson Memorial Methodist Episcopal Church | Simpson Memorial Methodist Episcopal Church | August 5, 1991 (#91001011) | 607 Shrewsbury St. 38°21′06″N 81°37′44″W | Charleston | |
| 10 | Samuel Starks House | Samuel Starks House | February 1, 1988 (#87002526) | 413 Shrewsbury St. 38°21′02″N 81°37′50″W | Charleston | |

== Lewis County ==
| | Name on the Register | Image | Date listed | Location | City or town | Description |
|---|---|---|---|---|---|---|
| 1 | Weston Colored School | Weston Colored School | April 9, 1993 (#93000224) | 345 Center St. 39°02′23″N 80°27′53″W | Weston | |

== McDowell County ==
| | Name on the Register | Image | Date listed | Location | City or town | Description |
|---|---|---|---|---|---|---|
| 1 | World War Memorial | World War Memorial | April 9, 1993 (#93000227) | U.S. Route 52; 37°25′31″N 81°30′24″W | Kimball | |

== Mercer County ==
| | Name on the Register | Image | Date listed | Location | City or town | Description |
|---|---|---|---|---|---|---|
| 1 | Hancock House | Hancock House | January 17, 1990 (#89001783) | 300 Sussex St. 37°16′33″N 81°13′13″W | Bluefield | |

== Monongalia County ==
| | Name on the Register | Image | Date listed | Location | City or town | Description |
|---|---|---|---|---|---|---|
| 1 | Second Ward Negro Elementary School | Second Ward Negro Elementary School | July 28, 1992 (#92000896) | Junction of White and Posten Aves. 39°37′17″N 79°56′57″W | Morgantown | |

== Pocahontas County ==
| | Name on the Register | Image | Date listed | Location | City or town | Description |
|---|---|---|---|---|---|---|
| 1 | Seebert Lane Colored School | | December 12, 2012 (#12001053) | Seebert Rd. 38°08′47″N 80°11′39″W | Seebert | |

== Preston County ==
| | Name on the Register | Image | Date listed | Location | City or town | Description |
|---|---|---|---|---|---|---|
| 1 | Indian Rocks Dining Hall | Indian Rocks Dining Hall | January 8, 2003 (#02001688) | WV 7, 1 mile east of Reedsville; 39°30′37″N 79°45′55″W | Reedsville | |

== Wood County ==
| | Name on the Register | Image | Date listed | Location | City or town | Description |
|---|---|---|---|---|---|---|
| 1 | Bethel AME Church | Bethel AME Church | October 8, 1998 (#82001767) | 820 Clay St. 39°15′58″N 81°33′18″W | Parkersburg | Demolished |
| 2 | Henry Logan Memorial AME Church | Henry Logan Memorial AME Church | December 16, 1982 (#82001778) | Ann and 6th Sts. 39°16′05″N 81°33′41″W | Parkersburg | |

== See also ==
- List of National Historic Landmarks in West Virginia
- National Register of Historic Places listings in West Virginia
