= Linda C. Meade-Tollin =

American biochemist

- Born: August 16, 1944 (age 82)
- Education: West Virginia State College (BS); City University of New York, Hunter College (MA); Graduate Center of the City University of New York(Ph.D.)
- Spouse: Gordon Tollin (divorced)
- Children: Amina Rebecca Meade-Tollin
- Scientific career
- Fields: Biochemistry; Microbiology; Chemistry; Anatomy; Surgery
- Workplaces: Barnard College; SUNY College at Old Westbury; The Rockefeller University; University of Arizona; Morehouse School of Medicine
- Thesis: (1972)

Linda Celida Meade-Tollin (born 16 August 1944) is an American biochemist and cancer researcher. In her research at the University of Arizona, she studied DNA damage, angiogenesis, and cancer invasion & metastasis; directed the Office of Women in Science and Engineering there; and was the first female chairperson of the National Organization for the Professional Advancement of Black Chemists and Chemical Engineers (NOBCChE).

== Early life and education ==
Meade-Tollin was born on August 16, 1944, in London, West Virginia, the daughter of Robert Alfred Meade, a dentist & community activist, and Virginia May Meade, a teacher & guidance counselor. She grew up in London and did well in school, skipping two grades and entering high school at a young age. Her first year of high school was also the school's first year of racial integration, and the first opportunity Meade-Tollin and her female peers to enroll in a science course.

At the age of 16, Meade-Tollin entered West Virginia State College. She studied chemistry, was a member of Alpha Kappa Alpha, and completed her Bachelor of Science in 1964 at age 19.

She continued to Hunter College where she completed a Master of Science in biochemistry in 1969. Meade-Tollin worked at both Harlem and Bellevue Hospitals before entering a Doctor of Philosophy program in chemistry at the Graduate Center of the City University of New York (CUNY) at age 21. After a year, she switched to biochemistry, completing her thesis on gene expression in E. coli and finishing her degree in 1972. Meade-Tollin may have been first Black woman to graduate from CUNY with a Ph.D. in Biochemistry but CUNY records don't indicate race and therefore cannot confirm this milestone.

== Career ==
Meade-Tollin accepted a faculty appointment at the College at Old Westbury, simultaneously serving as a visiting assistant professor at Rockefeller University, where she studied sickle cell anemia as part of Anthony Cerami's research team.

In 1975, she began a National Institutes of Health biochemistry research fellowship at the University of Arizona in Tucson. At the time, she was the only Black woman to head a biomedical research laboratory there, and her research focused on studying DNA damage, angiogenesis, and cancer invasion & metastasis.

Her angiogenesis research first used human microvascular endothelial cells to develop "a more physiologically relevant and highly reproducible rapid model angiogenesis assay", which researchers then used to screen desert plants and fungi for ingredients that could be used in cancer treatment drugs. Meade-Tollin worked with Leslie Gunatilaka & Luke Whitesell on this research.

At the University of Arizona, Meade-Tollin was the director of the Office of Women in Science and Engineering in the Department of Women's Studies, and she spent significant time planning and developing workshops and conferences that sought to encourage women to enter science and engineering fields. She also helped present American Association of Medical Colleges workshops for leaders in medical academia.

Meade-Tollin spent a year as faculty development fellow at the Morehouse School of Medicine in Atlanta and in 1993 became the first female national chairperson of the National Organization for the Professional Advancement of Black Chemists and Chemical Engineers (NOBCChE).

She retired from the University of Arizona as a Research Assistant Professor Emerita in 2008.

== Awards and honors ==
- 1987 & 1988 Minority Investigator award, National Cancer Institute
- 1994 Minority Investigator award, National Heart Lung and Blood Institute
- 1998 award from NOBCChE for contributions "to the field of biochemistry and medical research"
- Board member, international journal Acta Histochemica

== Personal life ==
While at Rockefeller University, Meade-Tollin met Gordon Tollin who was on sabbatical there.

During her tenure at the University of Arizona, Meade-Tollin was a caregiver for her aging parents. As of 2012, Meade-Tollin, who had divorced her husband, lived in Tucson.

== Selected publications ==
- Tropp, Burton E.; Meade, Linda C.; Thomas, Paul J. (1970). "Consequences of Expression of the" Relaxed" Genotype of the RC Gene: LIPID SYNTHESIS". Journal of Biological Chemistry. 245 (4): 855–858. doi:10.1016/S0021-9258(18)63343-5. PMID 4906637.
- Meade-Tollin, Linda C.; Wijeratne, EM Kithsiri; Cooper, Deborah; Guild, Mischa; Jon, Edlyn; Fritz, Anne; Zhou, Guang-Xiong; Whitesell, Luke; Liang, Jing-yu; Gunatilaka, AA Leslie (2004). "Ponicidin and oridonin are responsible for the antiangiogenic activity of Rabdosia rubescens, a constituent of the herbal supplement PC SPES". Journal of Natural Products. 67 (1): 2–4. doi:10.1021/np0304114. PMID 14738375.
- Meade-Tollin, Linda C.; Van Noorden, Cornelis JF (2000). "Time lapse phase contrast video microscopy of directed migration of human microvascular endothelial cells on matrigel". Acta Histochemica. 102 (3): 299–307. doi:10.1078/S0065-1281(04)70037-9. PMID 10990067.
- Van Noorden, Cornelis JF; Meade-Tollin, Linda C.; Bosman, Fred T. (1998). "Metastasis: the spread of cancer cells to distant sites implies a complex series of cellular abnormalities caused, in part, by genetic aberrations". American Scientist. 86 (2): 130–141. doi:10.1511/1998.21.860. S2CID 257897999.
- Meade-Tollin, Linda C.; Way, Dennis; Witte, Marlys H. (1999). "Expression of multiple matrix metalloproteinases and urokinase type plasminogen activator in cultured Kaposi sarcoma cells". Acta Histochemica. 101 (3): 305–316. doi:10.1016/S0065-1281(99)80031-2. PMID 10443293.
