= Black Southerners =

African Americans living in the Southern United States

- Proposed flag of the Republic of New Afrika, used as a symbol of Black Southerners

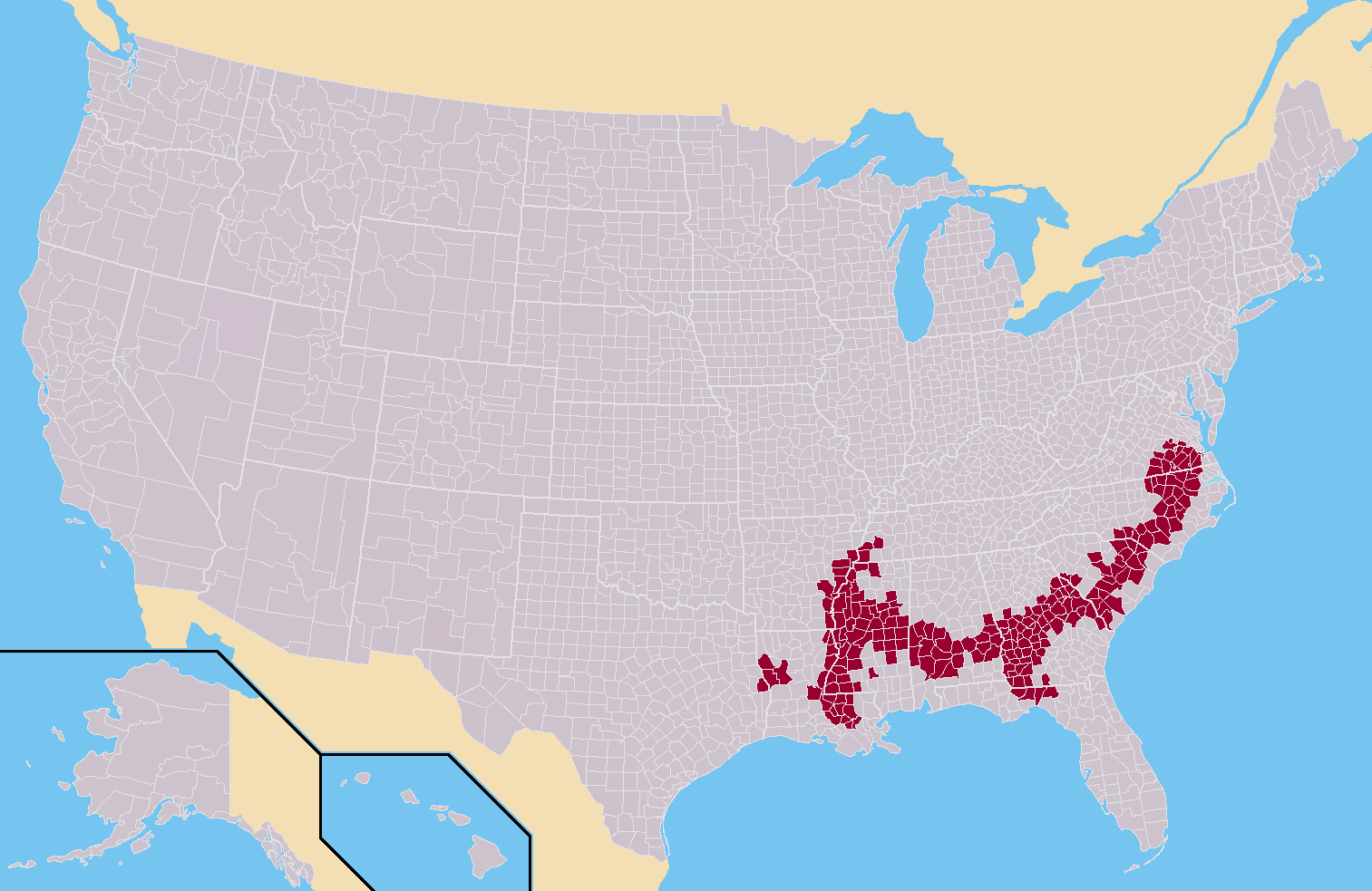
- Southern counties that were at least 40% Black or African American in the 2000 Census

Total population
- ▲20,829,578 (2020 census) ▼18.58% of the total population

Regions with significant populations
- Southern United States
- Texas: 3,552,997
- Georgia: 3,320,513
- Florida: 3,246,381
- North Carolina: 2,140,217
- Virginia: 1,607,581
- Louisiana: 1,464,023
- Alabama: 1,296,162
- South Carolina: 1,280,531
- Tennessee: 1,092,948
- Mississippi: 1,084,481
- Arkansas: 453,783
- Oklahoma: 289,961

Languages
- Southern American English, African American English, Gullah, Afro-Seminole Creole, Black Texan English, Louisiana Creole, African-American Vernacular English, New Orleans English, Louisiana French

Religion
- Predominantly Protestantism; Minorities: Roman Catholicism, Islam, Hoodoo (spirituality), Louisiana Voodoo, Atheism

Related ethnic groups
- White Southerners, African Americans, Gullah, Affrilachians and Melungeons, Black Seminoles, Redbones, Creoles of color

Black Southerners are African Americans living in the Southern United States, the United States region with the largest black population.

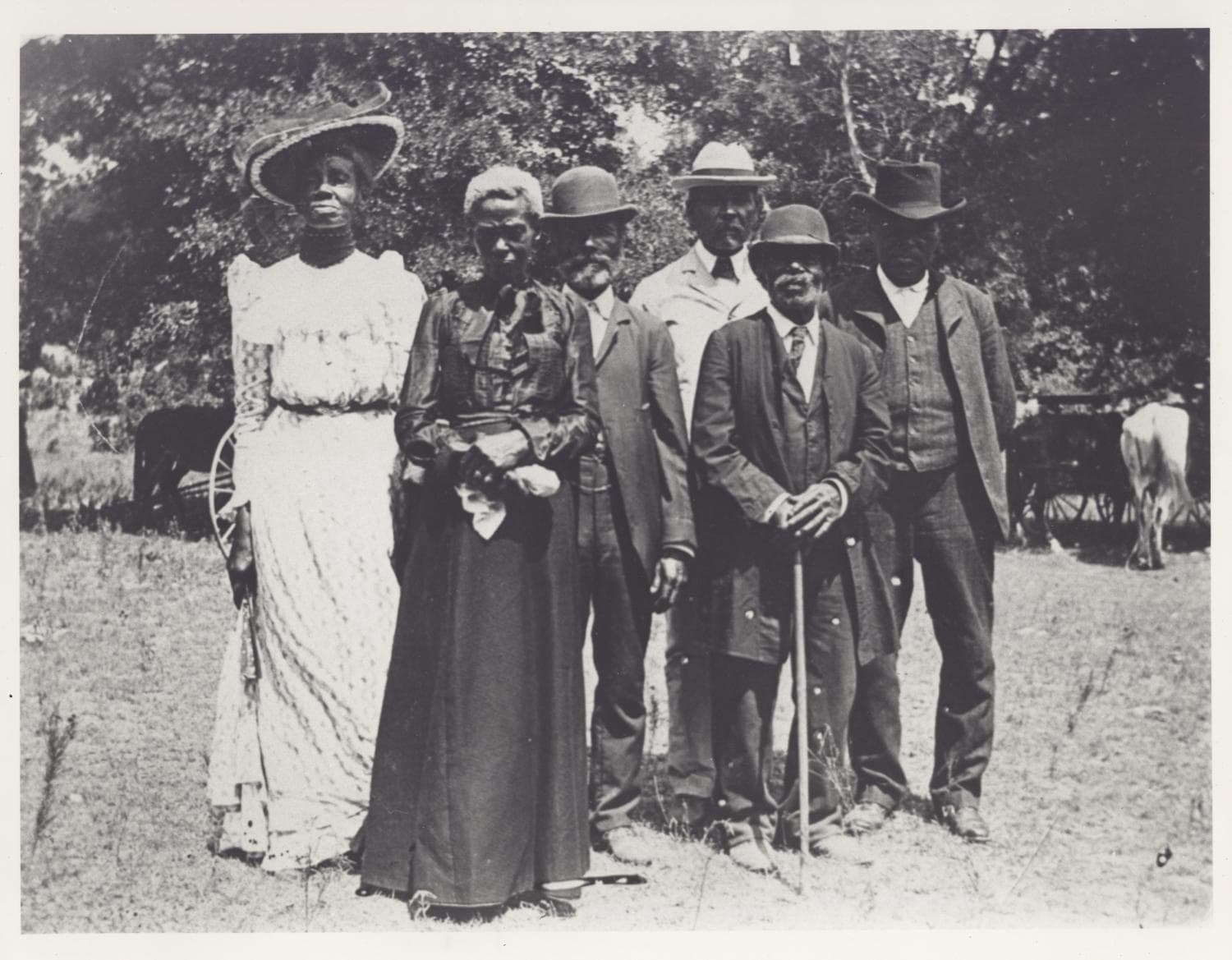
Celebration of Emancipation Day (Juneteenth) in 1900, in Texas

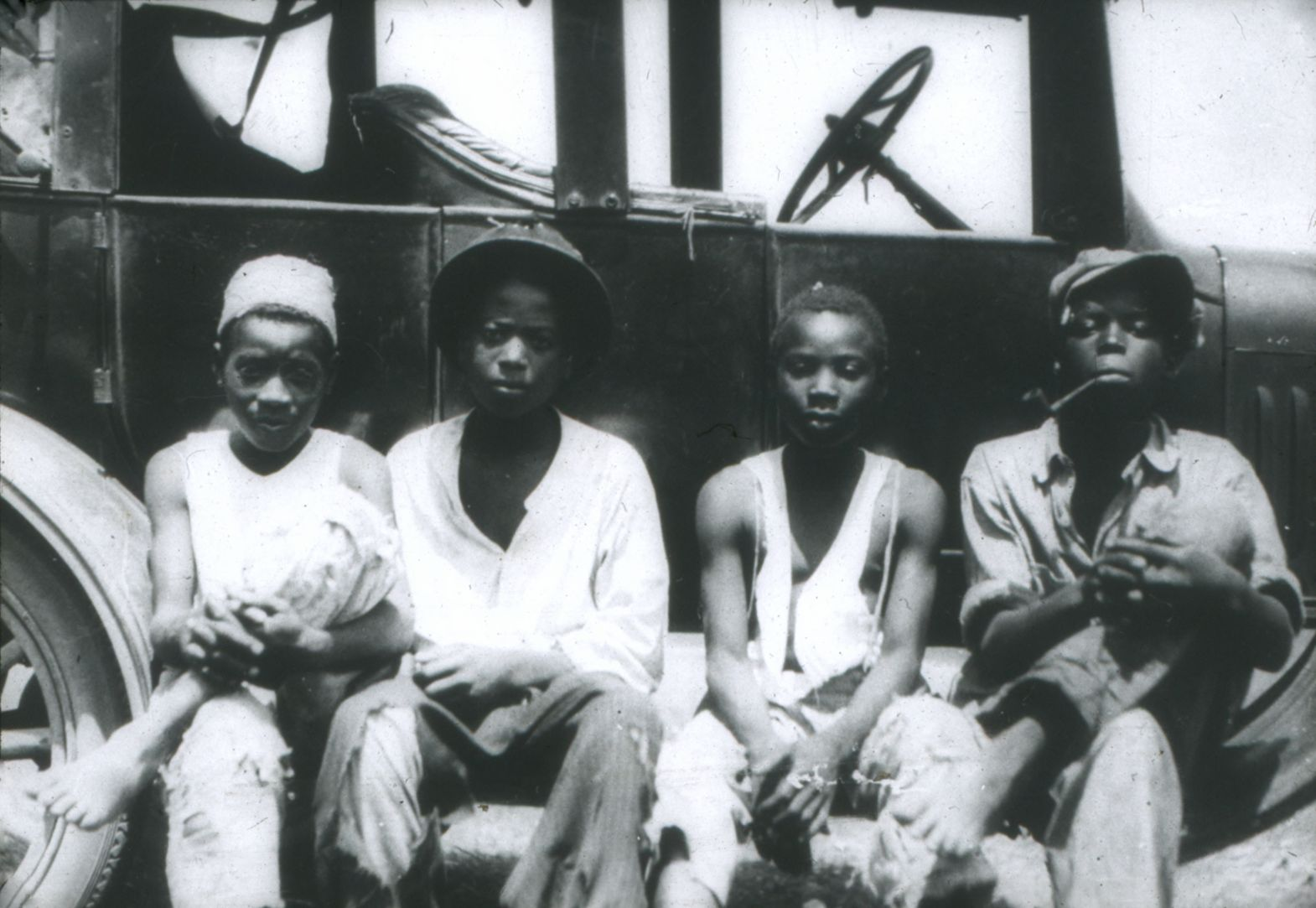
African American children in the South

Despite a total of 6 million Black people migrating from the South to cities in the North and West from 1916 to 1970, the majority of the Black population remains concentrated in the Southern states. In addition, since the 1970s, numerous Black Americans have migrated to the South from other U.S. regions in a reverse New Great Migration, but they tend to be educated and to settle in urban areas. Black Southerners strongly contributed to the cultural blend of Christianity, foods, art, music (see spiritual, blues, jazz and rock and roll) that characterize Southern culture today.

African slaves were sent to the South during the slave trade. Slavery in the United States was primarily located in the American South. By 1850, about 3.2 million African slaves labored in the United States, 1.8 million of whom worked in the cotton fields. Black slaves in the South faced arbitrary power abuses from white people. Before the Civil War, more than 4 million black slaves worked in the South. Virginia had the largest slave population, followed by Georgia, Mississippi, Alabama and South Carolina. There are large black communities in urban cities in the South such as Houston, Memphis, New Orleans, Dallas and Atlanta.

Black Southerners are more likely to identify as a Southerner and claim Southern identity than their counterpart White Southerners.

== History ==
Map of slaves in the South from the census of 1860.

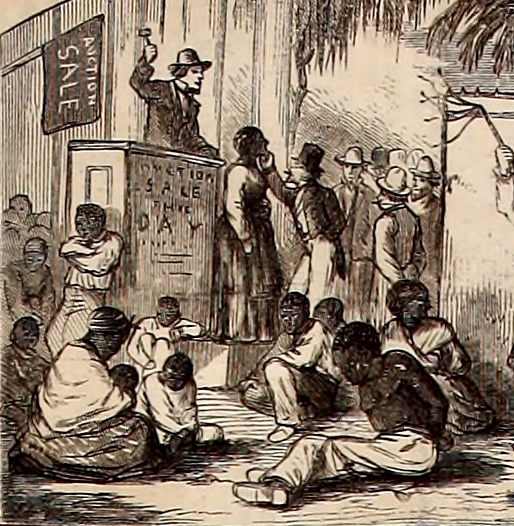
Slave auction in the South.

White European colonists turned to Africans as a cheaper, more plentiful labor source than Native Americans and poor white indentured servants. Native Americans in the region also died from diseases due to the Spanish.

White men frequently raped black women in the South and committed acts of sexual violence against black female slaves.

=== Origins ===
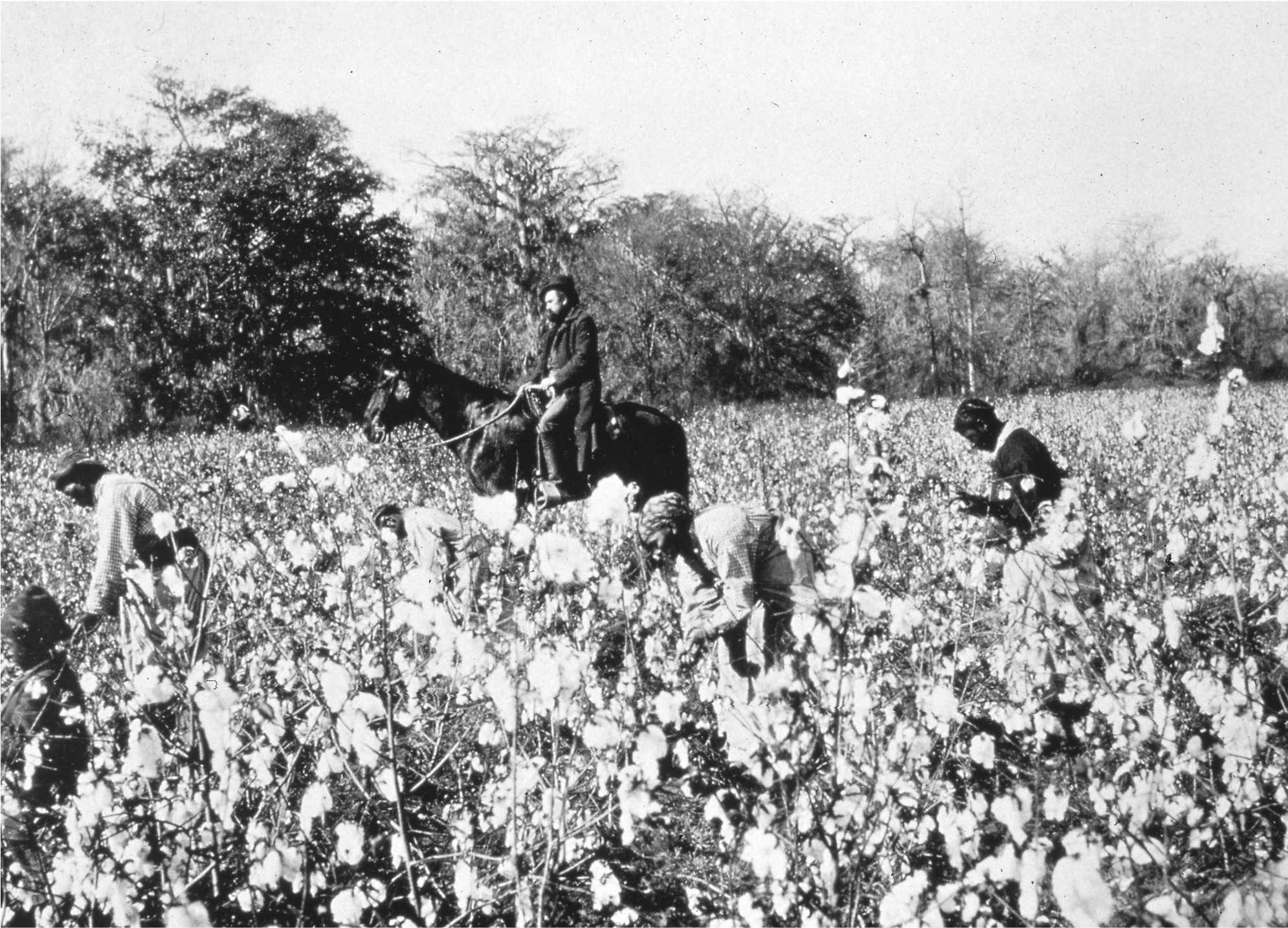
Black cotton pickers in the southern United States, 1850.

The history of Africans in the South dates to 1619, when a ship headed toward San Juan, Mexico was intercepted by two pirate ships. The pirates expected to steal precious metals like gold and silver, but they found that the ship held 350 black Africans from the Kingdom of Ndongo on the Kwanza River in north central Angola. The pirates took 60 of the best and healthiest slaves to the English colony of Jamestown with the hopes of selling them to the manpower-deprived city. The settlers of Jamestown purchased 32 slaves (17 men and 15 women), with the hopes that slave labor would help expand the colony. These slaves and their descendants worked wherever they were needed up until 1705. Between 1619 and the outbreak of the American Revolutionary War in 1775, hundreds of thousands of black Africans were sold into slavery and imported into the Thirteen Colonies.

=== Revolutionary War ===
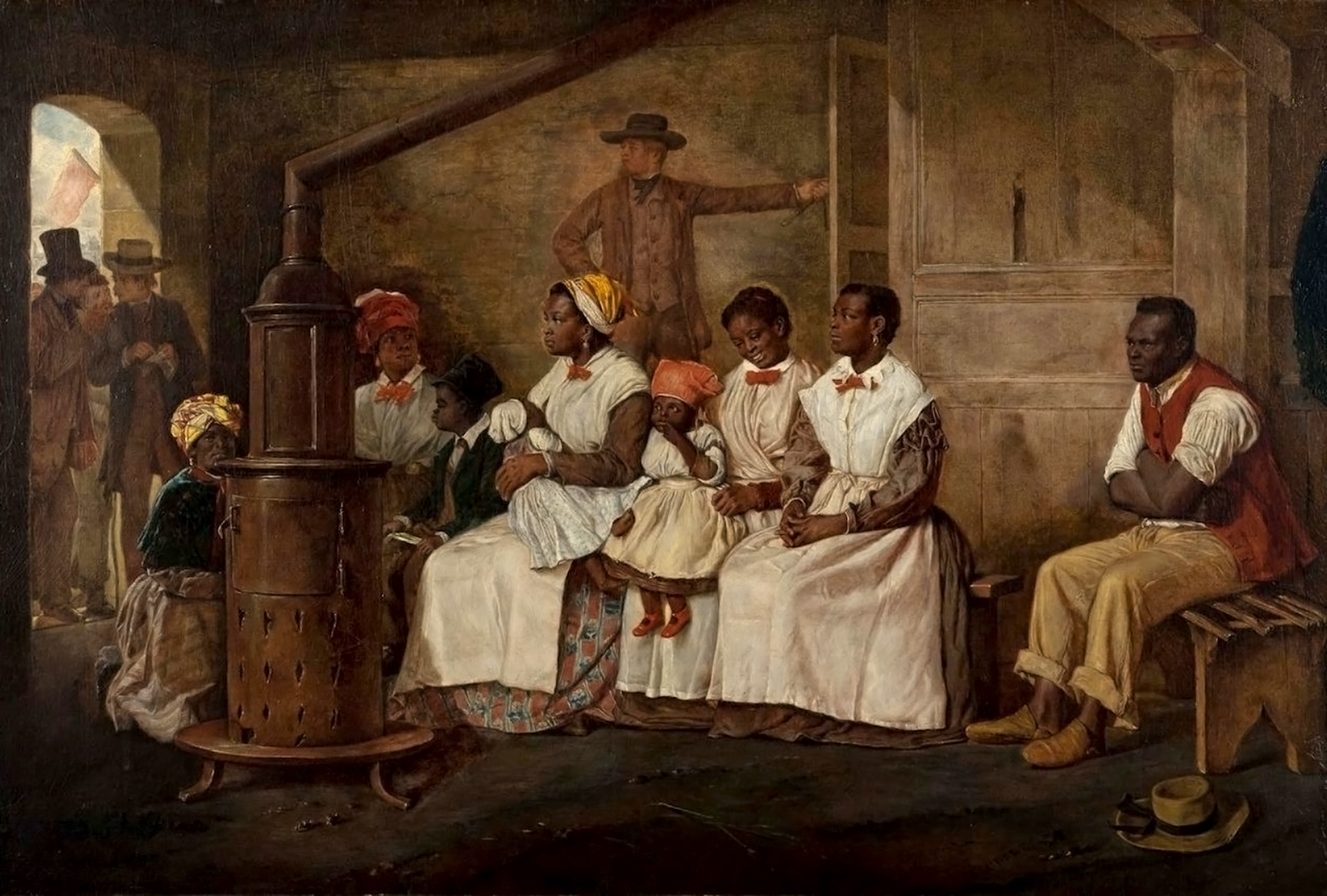
Slaves Waiting for Sale: Richmond, Virginia, 1853. Note the new clothes. The domestic slave trade broke up many families, and individuals lost their connection to families and clans.

African Americans played an important role in America's independence war against Great Britain. After suffering from ongoing oppression, they saw independence as an opportunity to break free from slavery and end unfair treatment. During the war, Black people fought for whichever side they thought would have the best chance of granting them their freedom. It is estimated that 20,000 African Americans joined the British cause, which promised freedom to enslaved people, as Black Loyalists. Around 9,000 African Americans became Black Patriots.

In state navies, some African Americans served as captains: South Carolina had significant numbers of Black captains.

The British regular army had some fears that, if armed, Black men would start slave rebellions. Trying to placate southern planters, the British used African Americans as laborers, skilled workers, foragers and spies. Lord Dunmore, the royal governor of Virginia, was determined to maintain British rule in the southern colonies and promised to free those enslaved men of rebel owners who fought for him. On November 7, 1775, he issued a proclamation: "I do hereby further declare all indented servants, Negroes, or others, (appertaining to Rebels,) free, that are able and willing to bear arms, they joining His Majesty's Troops." By December 1775, the British army had 300 enslaved men wearing a military uniform. Sewn on the breast of the uniform was the inscription "Liberty to Slaves". These enslaved men were designated as "Lord Dunmore's Ethiopian Regiment." Except for those Black men who joined the Ethiopian Regiment, only a few Black men, such as Seymour Burr, served in the British army while the fighting was concentrated in the North. It was not until the final months of the war, when manpower was low, that loyalists used Black men to fight for Britain in the South. In Savannah, Georgia, Augusta, Georgia, and Charleston, South Carolina, when threatened by Patriot forces, the British filled gaps in their troops with African Americans. In October 1779, about 200 Black Loyalist soldiers assisted the British in successfully defending Savannah against a joint French and rebel American attack.

Dunmore's Black soldiers aroused fear among some Patriots. The Ethiopian unit was used most frequently in the South, where the Black population was oppressed to the breaking point. As a response to expressions of fear posed by armed Black men, in December 1775, George Washington wrote a letter to Colonel Henry Lee III, stating that success in the war would come to whatever side could arm Black men the fastest; therefore, he suggested a policy to execute any of the slaves who would attempt to gain freedom by joining the British effort. Washington issued orders to the recruiters to reenlist the free Black men who had already served in the army; he worried that some of these soldiers might cross over to the British side.

=== Revolutionary War to Civil War ===
The Black Patriots who served the Continental Army found that the postwar military held few rewards for them, as it was much reduced in size, and the Southern states had banned all enslaved men from their militias. North Carolina was among the states that allowed free people of color to serve in their militias and bear arms until the 1830s. In 1792, the United States Congress formally excluded African Americans from military service, allowing only "free able-bodied white male citizens" to serve.

At the time of the ratification of the Constitution in 1789, free Black men could vote in five of the thirteen states, including North Carolina. That demonstrated that they were considered citizens not only of their states but of the United States.

Although southern state legislatures maintained the institution of slavery, numerous slaveholders, especially those in the Upper South, were inspired by revolutionary ideals to free the people they had enslaved. In addition, in this period, Methodist, Baptist and Quaker preachers also urged manumission. The proportion of free Black people in the Upper South increased markedly, from less than 1 percent of all Black people to more than 10 percent, even as the number of enslaved people was increasing overall. More than half of the number of free Black people in the United States were concentrated in the Upper South. In Delaware, nearly 75 percent of Black people were free by 1810. This was also a result of a changing economy, as many planters had been converting from labor-intensive tobacco to mixed commodity crops, with less need for intensive labor.

After that period, few enslaved people were granted freedom. A modern mechanical cotton gin was invented by Eli Whitney in 1793 and patented in 1794. Whitney's gin used a combination of a wire screen and small wire hooks to pull the cotton through, while brushes continuously removed the loose cotton lint to prevent jams. The invention of the cotton gin made cultivation of short-staple cotton profitable, and the Deep South was developed for this product. This drove up the demand for slave labor in that developing area, causing more than one million slaves to be transported to the Deep South in the domestic slave trade.

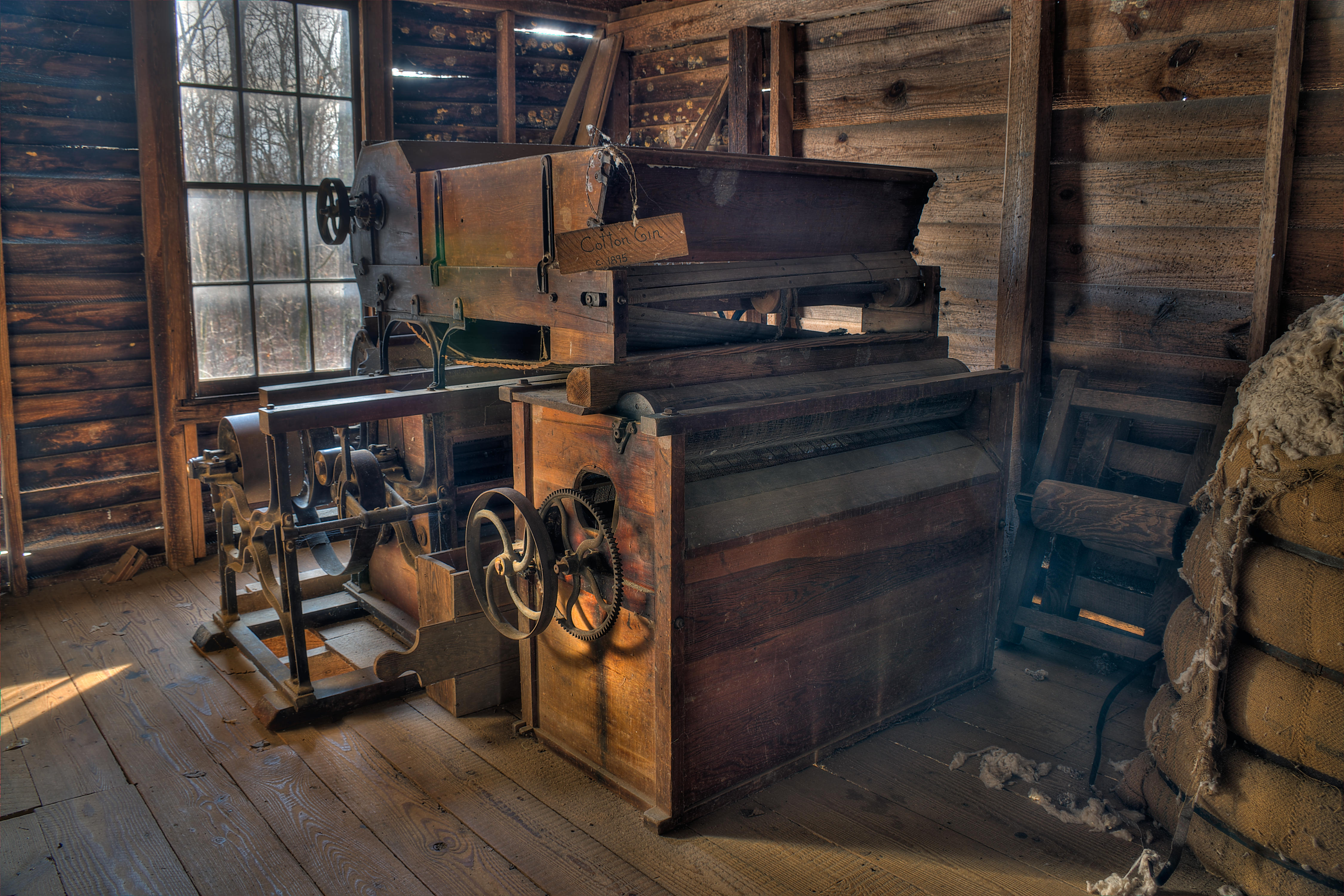
Cotton gin at Jarrell Plantation

Prior to the introduction of the mechanical cotton gin, cotton had required considerable labor to clean and separate the fibers from the seeds. With Eli Whitney's gin, cotton became a tremendously profitable business, creating many fortunes in the Antebellum South. Cities such as New Orleans, Louisiana; Mobile, Alabama; Charleston, South Carolina; and Galveston, Texas became major shipping ports, deriving substantial economic benefit from cotton raised throughout the South.

The invention of the cotton gin caused massive growth in the production of cotton in the United States, concentrated mostly in the South. Cotton production expanded from 750,000 bales in 1830 to 2.85 million bales in 1850. As a result, the region became even more dependent on slave plantations, with agriculture becoming the largest sector of its economy. While it took a single slave about ten hours to separate a single pound of fiber from the seeds, a team of two or three slaves using a cotton gin could produce around fifty pounds of cotton in just one day. The number of slaves rose in concert with the increase in cotton production, increasing from around 700,000 in 1790 to around 3.2 million in 1850. The invention of the cotton gin led to an increased demand for slaves in the South, reversing the economic decline that had occurred in the region during the late 18th century. The cotton gin thus "transformed cotton as a crop and the American South into the globe's first agricultural powerhouse".

Because of its inadvertent effect on American slavery, and on its ensuring that the South's economy developed in the direction of plantation-based agriculture (while encouraging the growth of the textile industry elsewhere, such as in the North), the invention of the cotton gin is frequently cited as one of the indirect causes of the American Civil War.

=== Civil War and Jim Crow era ===
During the Civil War, runaway slaves from the South joined the fight on the side of the Union. In the Confederacy, both free and enslaved Black people were used for manual labor, but the issue of whether to arm them, and under what terms, became a major source of debate within the Confederate Congress, the President's Cabinet, and C.S. War Department staff. In general, newspapers, politicians, and army leaders alike were hostile to any efforts to arm Black people. The war's desperate circumstances meant that the Confederacy changed its policy in the last month of the war; in March 1865, a small program attempted to recruit, train, and arm Black people, but no significant numbers were ever raised or recruited, and those that were never saw combat.

The Civil War led to the passage of the 13th Amendment, which abolished slavery across the country; the 14th Amendment, which states that all people born in the United States are American citizens; and the 15th Amendment, which prohibits the federal government and state governments from denying a citizen the right to vote based on that citizen's "race, color, or previous condition of servitude." Reconstruction, the process of making the newly freed slaves into US citizens with civil rights ostensibly guaranteed by these three new constitutional amendments, angered many southern Whites, who were highly opposed to granting Black people citizenship and the right to vote. The 14th and 15th amendments were both nullified in 1883. White southerners, who had been forced to free their slaves, feared that Black involvement in politics would lead to "Negro supremacy" (Black majority rule); in reality, Black people never controlled the south politically.

For roughly 100 years after the end of the Civil War, Black Americans, especially in the South, suffered from racial oppression in the form of segregation and lynchings. Jim Crow laws, passed in the late 19th and early 20th century, required racial segregation in the states that had maintained slavery until 1865. Fully in place from 1910 onwards, Jim Crow laws reinstated white supremacy and contributed to the loss of the citizenship and voting rights that Black people had worked so hard to gain. These laws were based on "separate but equal" clauses, which legally mandated the racial separation of Black people from Whites in public places like schools, bathrooms, and transportation. Black people usually received inferior accommodations. Segregation determined which hospitals people were born in, which schools children could attend, and even dictated which graveyards people were buried in. Black people and Whites were also held to different legal standards, with two criminal justice systems in existence to maintain the separation of law and expectation. In instances of law breaking, the Ku Klux Klan, often working in tandem with law enforcement officers, would engage in racial terrorism against Black people.

=== Great Migration and Civil Rights Movement ===
African American population distribution during the Great Migration

The 1910 US census.

The 1970 US census.

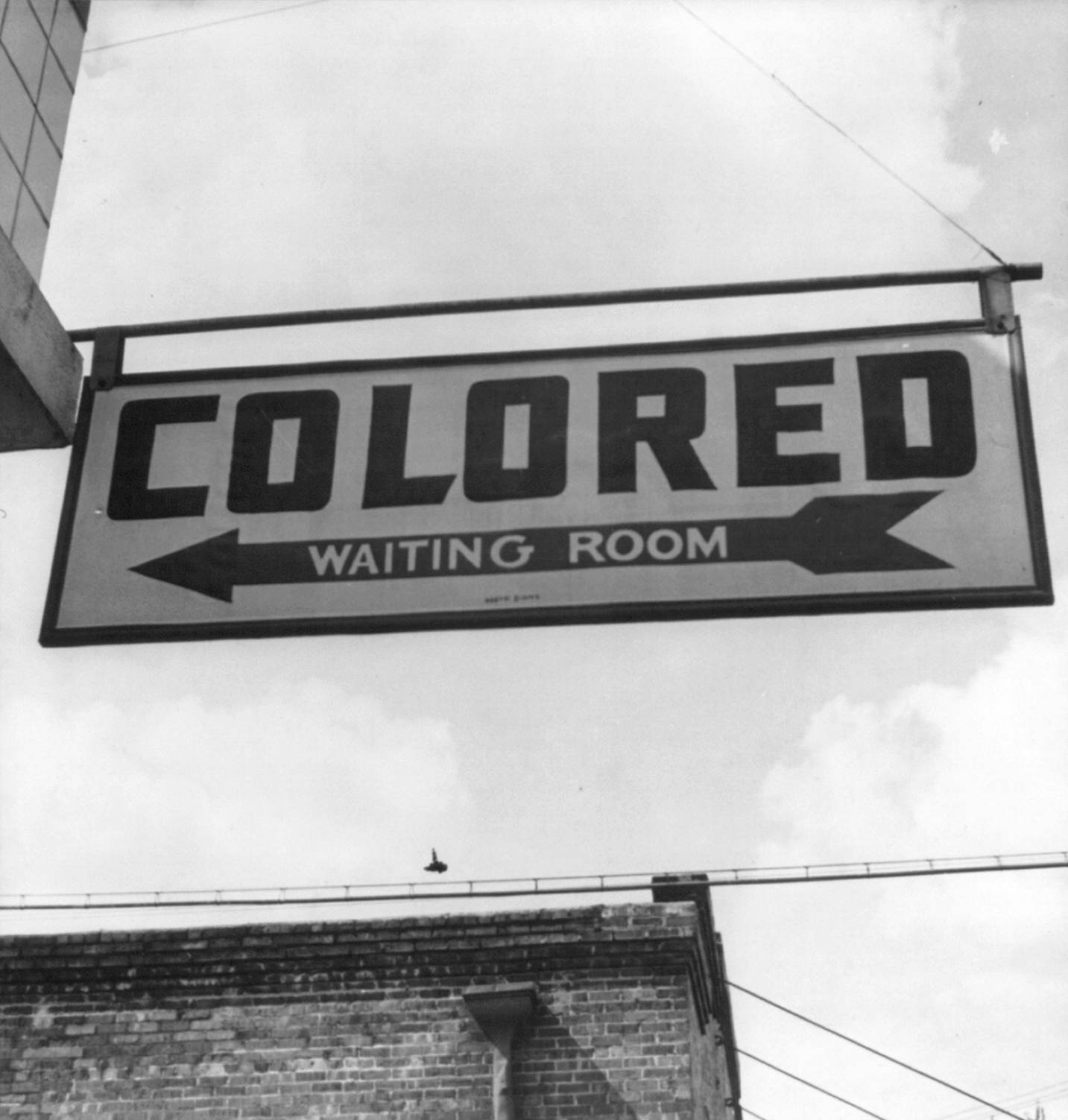
Racial segregation was commonplace in the South until the 1960s.

In the 20th century, two major events changed the lives of Black Southerners: the Great Migration and the Civil Rights Movement.

The first Great Migration began during World War I and continued until 1940, with the second wave hitting its high point during World War II and the post-World War II economic boom, which lasted until 1970. During both migrations, five million Black people left their homes in the South for Northern and Western states to find work in private and public sectors of the economy. They also wanted to leave the racial segregation, lynching, bigotry, violence, and disenfranchisement in the South behind. Upon arriving in the North and West, however, Black migrants unsurprisingly faced widespread racial discrimination there as well, being perceived as competitors for jobs and housing and blamed for lowering the property values of white residents. Despite this, conditions in the North and Western U.S. were still ahead of the South at that time; black people in those areas had the right to vote, could send their children to better schools, and were paid more for skilled and unskilled labor.

In reference to why so many Black people stayed in the South for so long, Jimmie Lewis Franklin points out that while Pan-Africanist values and prolonged discrimination may have inspired the continuous migration of Black people from the South in search of a better life, many choose to stay not due to a submission to racism, but out of the basic human desire to remain in an established home.

The migration also empowered the growing civil rights movement. While the movement existed in all parts of the United States, its focus was against ending disenfranchisement and Jim Crow laws in the South. A big part of the civil rights movement was nonviolent resistance. Organizations were formed around the idea of nonviolence. More often than not, the reasoning behind the nonviolence was religion, and the belief that everyone should be treated with love. It was also thought that violent protests would never gain the needed momentum, despite the fact that anti-racism protests were often disbanded with intense police violence. These nonviolent protestors were also inspired by the work of Gandhi. Leaders of the nonviolent protest movement like Martin Luther King Jr. and James Bevel were backed by religious morals and the ideals of Gandhi. These ideals, paired with the minds of civil rights leaders, drove the movement.

School segregation was finally declared unconstitutional in 1954 by the Supreme Court ruling of Brown vs The Board of Education. In this ruling, the Supreme Court overruled the "separate but equal" ruling of Plessy vs Ferguson in 1896, concluding that this was far from the reality. The 1954 Supreme Court ruling came about after 13 parents took to the courts to end racial segregation when their students were not admitted into the white school in their neighborhood. At that time, segregation was still a huge part of southern life. It was everywhere: restaurants, restrooms, and water fountains, to name a few examples. James Meredith was the first African American student to attend the University of Mississippi. On October 1, 1962, Ross Barnett, the governor of Mississippi, withheld Meredith's ability to register, and he was convicted of civil contempt. He complied and faced no major charges, but had he refused to halt his interference, he would have been arrested and ordered to pay a fine of $10,000 per day. However, a race riot ensued when Meredith arrived on campus, and President John F. Kennedy was forced to send the National Guard to Oxford, Mississippi, where two people were killed and 200 were injured. The next year, George Wallace, the governor of Alabama, symbolically stood in the front door of the University of Alabama to protest the admittance of two black students, James Hood and Vivian Malone, in an attempt to keep them from enrolling in the university. Reporters were invited to witness this protest during his reelection campaign, in which Nicholas Katzenbach, the United States Deputy Attorney General, stated that Wallace was unauthorized to do so, and he eventually stepped down.

Most of the major events in the movement occurred in the South, including the Montgomery bus boycott (1955–1956), the Mississippi Freedom Summer (1964), the Selma to Montgomery marches (1965), and the 1968 assassination of Martin Luther King Jr. The Montgomery Improvement Association was formed in 1955 with Martin Luther King Jr. as its president after Rosa Parks was arrested for sitting in the white section of a public city bus. The Association organized carpooling for Black people as well as weekly prayer groups. In 1956, it was ruled unconstitutional by the Supreme Court. The Montgomery bus boycott was a major event in the civil rights movement, and it brought King to national attention as the leader of this protest. He stressed the importance of nonviolence in gaining the respect of the oppressor. The Montgomery bus boycott helped birth organizations that were embedded in nonviolence. They were the Southern Christian Leadership Conference and the Student Nonviolent Coordinating Committee. Some of the most important writings to come out of the movement were written by black Southerners, such as King's famous 1963 "Letter from Birmingham Jail". Most civil rights landmarks can be found in the South. The Martin Luther King Jr. National Historical Park in Atlanta includes a museum that chronicles the Civil Rights Movement as well as Martin Luther King Jr.'s boyhood home on Auburn Avenue. Additionally, Ebenezer Baptist Church is located in the Sweet Auburn district, as is the King Center for Nonviolent Social Change, location of Martin and Coretta Scott King's gravesites.

=== New Great Migration ===
African American population distribution during the Great Migration

The 1970 US census.

The 2020 US census.

The Civil Rights Movement of the 1950s and 1960s ended Jim Crow laws across the South and other areas of the United States. A third migration appears to be underway, this time with African Americans from the North and West moving back to the South in record numbers. While race relations are still a contentious issue in the South and elsewhere in the U.S., the region surpasses the rest of the country in many areas of integration and racial equality. According to a 2003 report by researchers at the University of Wisconsin–Milwaukee; Virginia Beach, Charlotte, Houston, Nashville-Davidson, and Jacksonville were the five most integrated of the nation's fifty largest cities, with Memphis at number six. Southern states tend to have a low disparity in incarceration rates between Black people and Whites, relative to the rest of the country.

This rise in net gain points to Atlanta, Charlotte, Dallas, and Houston being a growing hot spots for the migrants of The New Great Migration. The percentage of Black Americans who live in the South has been increasing since 1990, and the biggest gains have been in the region's large urban areas, according to census data. The Black population of metro Atlanta more than doubled between 1990 and 2020, surpassing 2 million in the most recent census. The Black population also more than doubled in metro Charlotte while Greater Houston and Dallas-Fort Worth both saw their Black populations surpass 1 million for the first time. Several smaller metro areas also saw sizable gains, including San Antonio; Raleigh and Greensboro, N.C.; and Orlando.

== Culture ==
=== Music ===
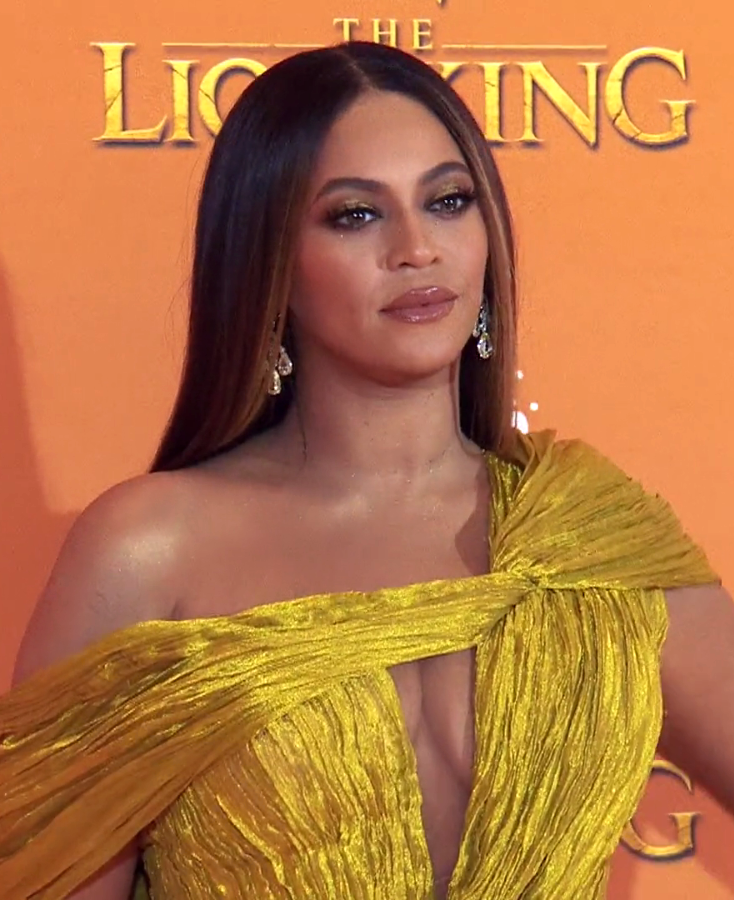
Beyoncé is a mixed black singer from Houston, Texas of African American and Louisiana Creole ancestry. Her African-American father Mathew Knowles is from Alabama and her Louisiana Creole mother Tina Knowles has roots in Louisiana.

Blues, a genre of music, originated from the sorrow songs that slaves would sing. Blues originated in the Deep South, mostly in cities like Memphis, Tennessee and New Orleans. Blues often consist of a sole singer with an instrument, usually a guitar, expressing their emotions. Blues music generally comes from the inspiration of love, sex, betrayal, poverty, bad luck, and lifestyles that are less than ideal.

Jazz music originated in New Orleans in the 1910s. Black people and Whites made music that would mix cultures and aspects of European and African music. Jazz was created as a different type of Blues music. Blues was considered to be reflective of lower class status, while jazz was more stylized. Aretha Franklin and Ray Charles were famous jazz musicians.

In the 1960s, a new type of music called funk emerged onto the scene. Funk is a type of music that brings soul and energy. It is significantly well known for the use of the electric bass guitar to create songs that are long and enable people to dance. James Brown was a notable funk musician. Michael Jackson was notorious for blending funk and soul music together to create a successful and popular genre of music that stemmed from old jazz and Motown.

Rap music originated from the pent-up anger of the civil rights movement. The biggest inspiration for rap music is soul music. Rap music and hip-hop music are often interchangeable. Hip-hop, however, covers a wider variety of topics and stems from a different type of energy. In the 1990s, a new form of rap called Gangsta rap emerged. Soon, there were rap rivalries between the East coast and the West Coast. In the South, many Black people perform and listen to Southern hip hop. Southern cities with their own hip hop scene are Houston, Atlanta, New Orleans, Memphis, and Miami. A notable black Southern hip hop musician is Lil Wayne, from New Orleans. He has won Grammy Awards and has sold millions of albums. Notable Southern hip hop musicians include Lil Jon, T.I., Flo Rida, Rich Boy, Rick Ross, Scarface, Young Jeezy and Lil Wayne.

In the 20th century, gospel music originated from Black people and Whites who created soulful and deep energy through music that also includes dance. The combination of music from Black and White cultures created a blend of Protestant hymns and African styles, two popular sectors of music that could harmoniously coexist. Black gospel musicians started creating their own trends by creating duos and choirs and competing worldwide in traveling singing groups. Eventually, this led to the combination of White and Black gospel groups; however, they remained distinctly separate.

R&B is popular among African Americans in the South. New Orleans rhythm and blues is often performed by black musicians from New Orleans. A notable black R&B singer from the South is Beyoncé. She often pays homage to her Southern culture in her music and music videos.

=== Religion ===
The vast majority of black people in the South are Protestant.

Reverend Martin Luther King Jr. was one of the most prominent African-American ministers in the South, leading a Baptist church in Atlanta.

Numerous other Christian denominations and other religions have entered the South with new migrants and immigrants. There has been exceeding growth of religions in the South. Catholic, Jewish, Hindu, and Buddhist religions have been introduced into large Southern cities. In 1999, more than 1 out of 5 people identified as being part of a religion other than a Protestant sect. African Americans made up 39% of those persons affiliated with other religions.

In 2000, the city of Atlanta had 10,000 Buddhists, 12,000 Hindus, and 30,000 Muslims.

In Louisiana, some Black Southerners perform Louisiana Voodoo. Slaves brought their Voodoo religion to Louisiana and Haiti from Benin.

=== Food ===
The south is known for many foods, many of which contain African American influences.

George Washington Carver, a botanist from Missouri, made many discoveries regarding the peanut. The United Peanut Associations of America reached out to Carver to discuss Carver's many advances using the peanut. Carver gave a discussion regarding the peanut and all the things that can be done with a peanut.

Popular southern dishes:

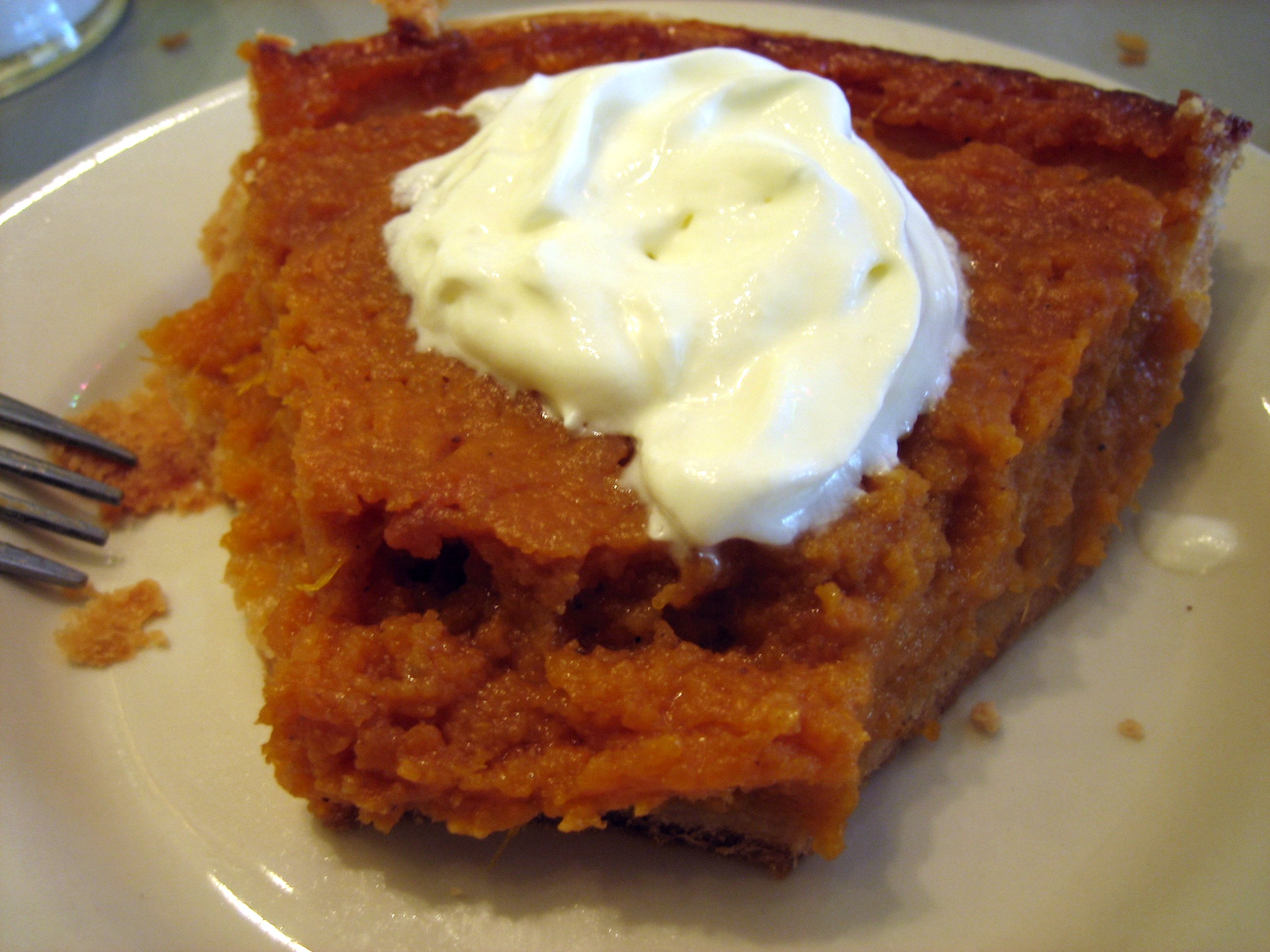
Sweet potato pie

Sweet:

- Pecan Pie
- Mississippi Mud Pie
- Peach Cobbler
- Moon Pie
- Sweet potato pie

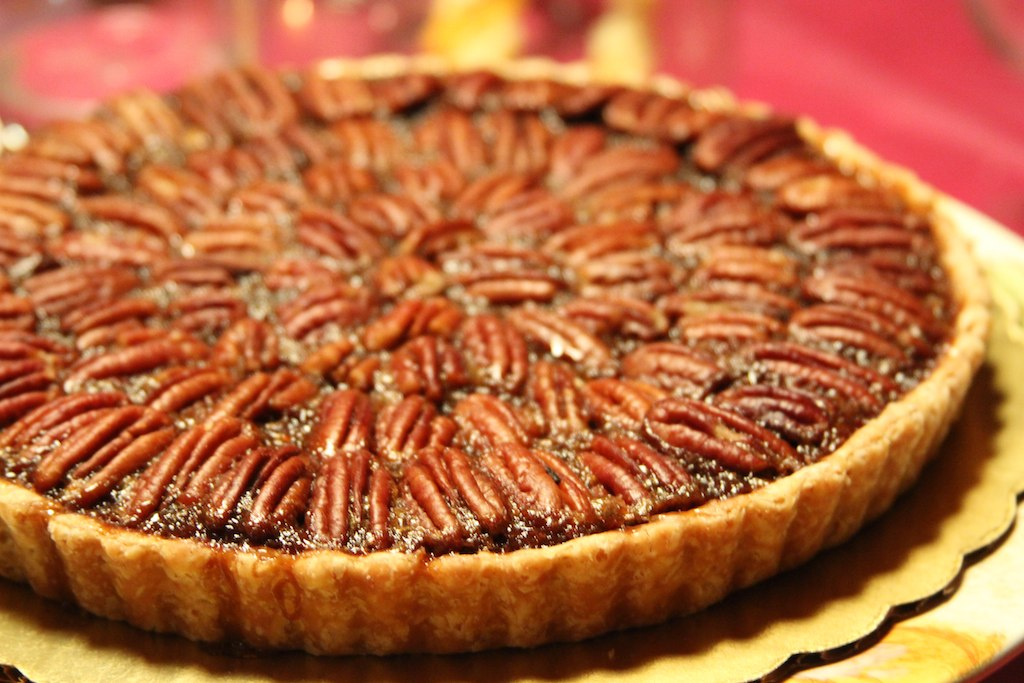
Pecan pie

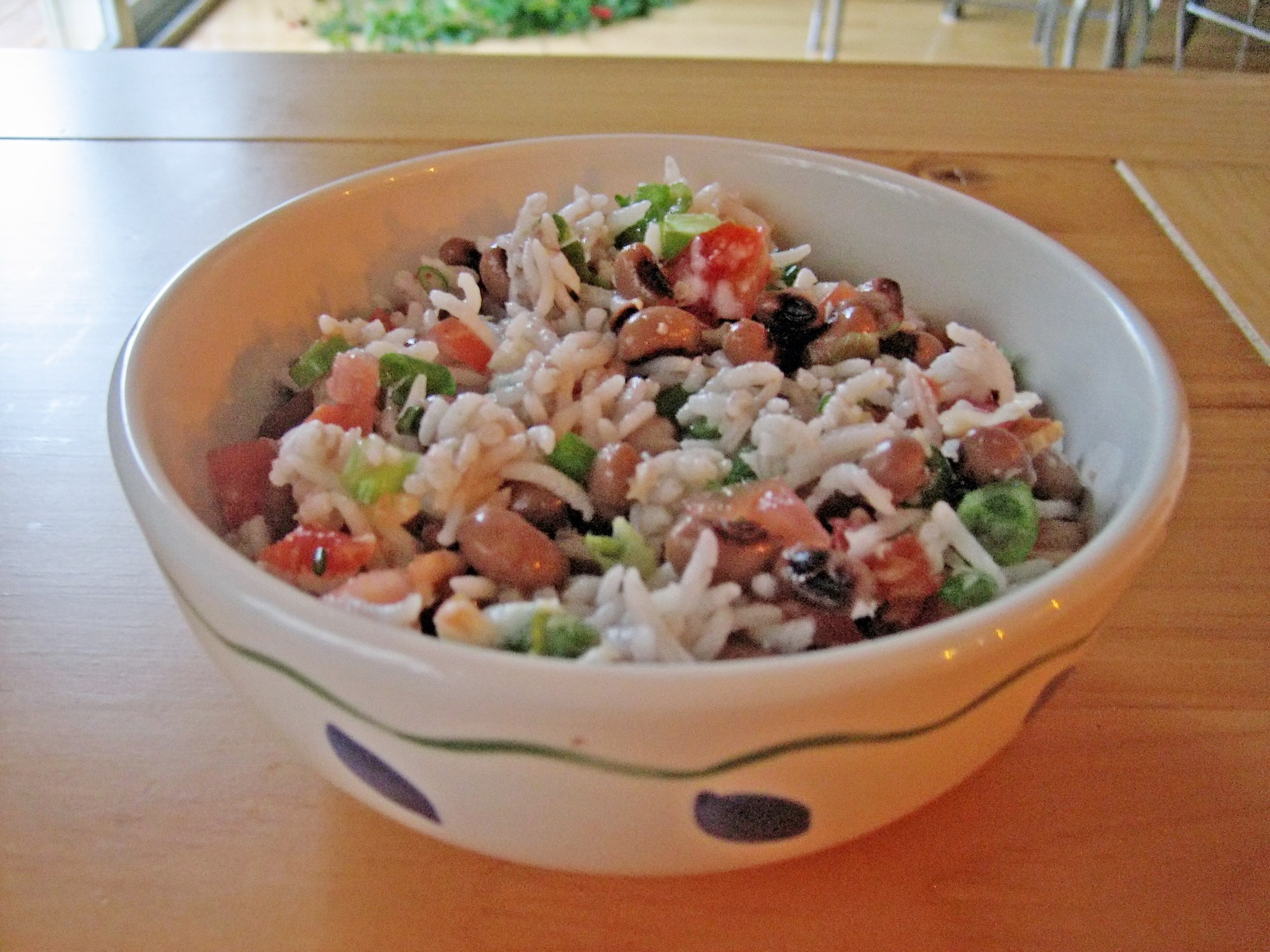
Hoppin' John

Savory:

- Cornbread
- Pulled pork
- Grits
- Jambalaya (Louisiana)
- Deviled eggs
- Fried Chicken
- Gumbo (Louisiana)
- Hoppin' John (South Carolina)

=== Professionalism and jobs ===
The African American job market had significantly changed in the latter half of the 20th century. Previously, almost all African Americans were impoverished. The poverty rate has significantly declined since then. In 1998, more than 40% of African Americans considered themselves to be in the middle class. They previously had low-paying manual jobs such as sharecroppers, laborers, or any other jobs that Whites wouldn't work. A majority of African American women worked as servants, and they were paid even less than men. In 1948, 6 out of 10 African American women worked as servants. In 1998, African Americans were one of the fastest growing entrepreneurial groups in the United States. Over half of the black population in America worked a white-collar job. The income gap between Black people and Whites has been cut by about a third since 1948. Although the gap still exists, two-parent Black families earn 13% less than two-parent White families.

=== Black suburbs ===
Since the second Great Migration ended in 1970, many Black people have moved back to the South. This is largely due to improved race relations and an improvement of the economy in the South. Primary destinations are states such as Texas, Georgia, North Carolina, Maryland, Virginia, Tennessee, and Florida. African Americans began moving to the suburbs seeking out safer and more comfortable housing. There is a common misconception that much of the African American population lives in ghettos in high-rise, government-provided housing, when in reality, over 33% live in the suburbs. While both White and Black families live in suburbia, the neighborhoods seemingly are very separated. Many of the middle class African American families live in all Black suburbia. The African American middle class continues to grow, with more than 40% of the Black middle class population owning a home.

In the 1980s, for example, the population of Prince George's County, Maryland, where suburban housing was developed near Washington, DC, became majority African American. By 2006, it was the wealthiest majority-black county in the nation. Similar to White Americans, African Americans continue to move to more distant areas. Charles County, Maryland has become the next destination for middle-class black migrants from Washington and other areas; by 2002, the students in the school system were majority black. Charles County has the fastest-growing black population of any large county in the nation except the Atlanta suburbs. Randallstown near Baltimore has also become a majority-black suburb. Other major majority-black suburbs include Bessemer, AL; Miami Gardens, FL; Pine Hills, FL; College Park, GA; East Point, GA; Harvey, IL; Matteson, IL; Maywood, IL; Merrillville, IN; Eastpointe, MI; Inkster, MI; Oak Park, MI; Southfield, MI; East Orange, NJ; Irvington, NJ; Orange, NJ; Plainfield, NJ; Willingboro, NJ; Hempstead, NY; Mount Vernon, NY; Ferguson, MO; Forest Park, OH; Darby, PA; Rankin, PA; Wilkinsburg, PA; Yeadon, PA; Converse, TX; Desoto, TX; Glenn Heights, TX; Lancaster, TX; Missouri City, TX and others.

== See also ==
=== By city ===
- African Americans in Atlanta
- African Americans in Washington, D.C.
- History of African Americans in Baltimore
- History of African Americans in Dallas-Fort Worth
- History of African Americans in Houston
- History of African Americans in Jacksonville, Florida
- History of African Americans in Los Angeles
- History of African Americans in San Antonio

=== By State ===
- African Americans in Alabama
- African Americans in Arkansas
- African Americans in California
- African Americans in Delaware
- African Americans in Florida
- African Americans in Georgia (U.S. state)
- African Americans in Kentucky
- African Americans in Louisiana
- African Americans in Maryland
- African Americans in Mississippi
- African Americans in North Carolina
- African Americans in Oklahoma
- African Americans in South Carolina
- African Americans in Tennessee
- African Americans in Texas
- African Americans in Virginia
- African Americans in West Virginia
