= African Americans in Arkansas =

Racial group in the US state

Total population
- 457,840 (2020)

Regions with significant populations
- Little Rock, Pulaski County, Jefferson County and Crittenden County

Languages
- Southern American English, African-American Vernacular English

Religion
- Black Protestant, Hoodoo, African traditional religions

African Americans have played an essential role in the history of Arkansas, but their role has often been marginalized as they confronted a society and polity controlled by white supremacists. As slaves in the United States, they were considered property and were subjected to the harsh conditions of forced labor. After the Civil War and the passage of the 13th, 14th, and 15th Reconstruction Amendments to the U.S. Constitution, African Americans gained their freedom and the right to vote. However, the rise of Jim Crow laws in the 1890s and early 1900s led to a period of segregation and discrimination that lasted into the 1960s. Most were farmers, working their own property or poor sharecroppers on white-owned land, or very poor day laborers. By World War I, there was steady emigration from farms to nearby cities such as Little Rock and Memphis, as well as to St. Louis and Chicago.

During the Civil Rights Movement of the 1950s and 1960s, the African Americans fought for an end to segregation and discrimination. The Little Rock Nine, a group of Black students who enrolled in the previously all-white Little Rock Central High School in 1957, became a national symbol of the struggle for civil rights.

In the decades since the Civil Rights Movement, progress has been made in the state, including the election of Black politicians to local and state offices, and the desegregation of schools and public spaces. However, disparities in areas such as education, healthcare, and economic opportunity still persist.

In the 20th and 21st centuries, Black women in Arkansas have been continued to be active in the struggle for civil rights. Women such as Daisy Bates, who played a significant role in the integration of Little Rock Central High School, and Lottie Shackelford, the first Black woman elected to the Little Rock City Board of Directors, helped to bring about significant change in the state. Today, Black women in Arkansas continue to face challenges related to systemic racism and discrimination.

== History ==
=== Slavery ===
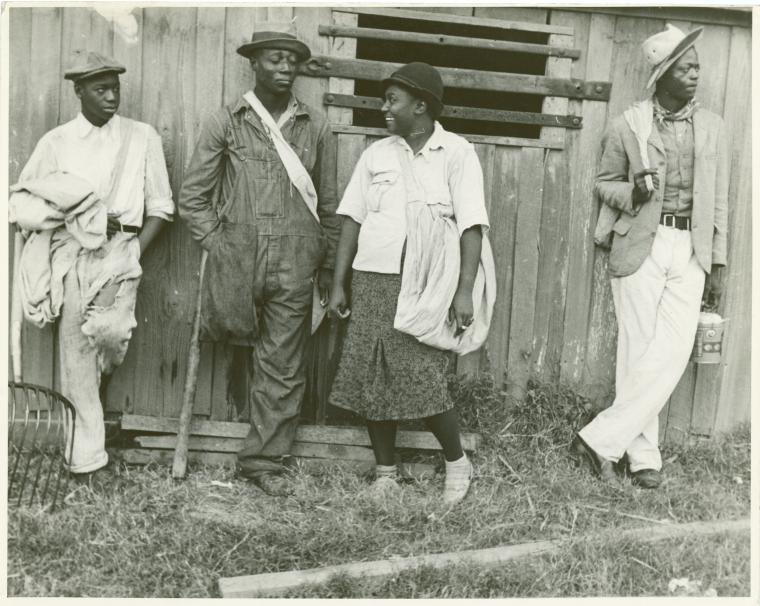
African American cotton pickers in Arkansas

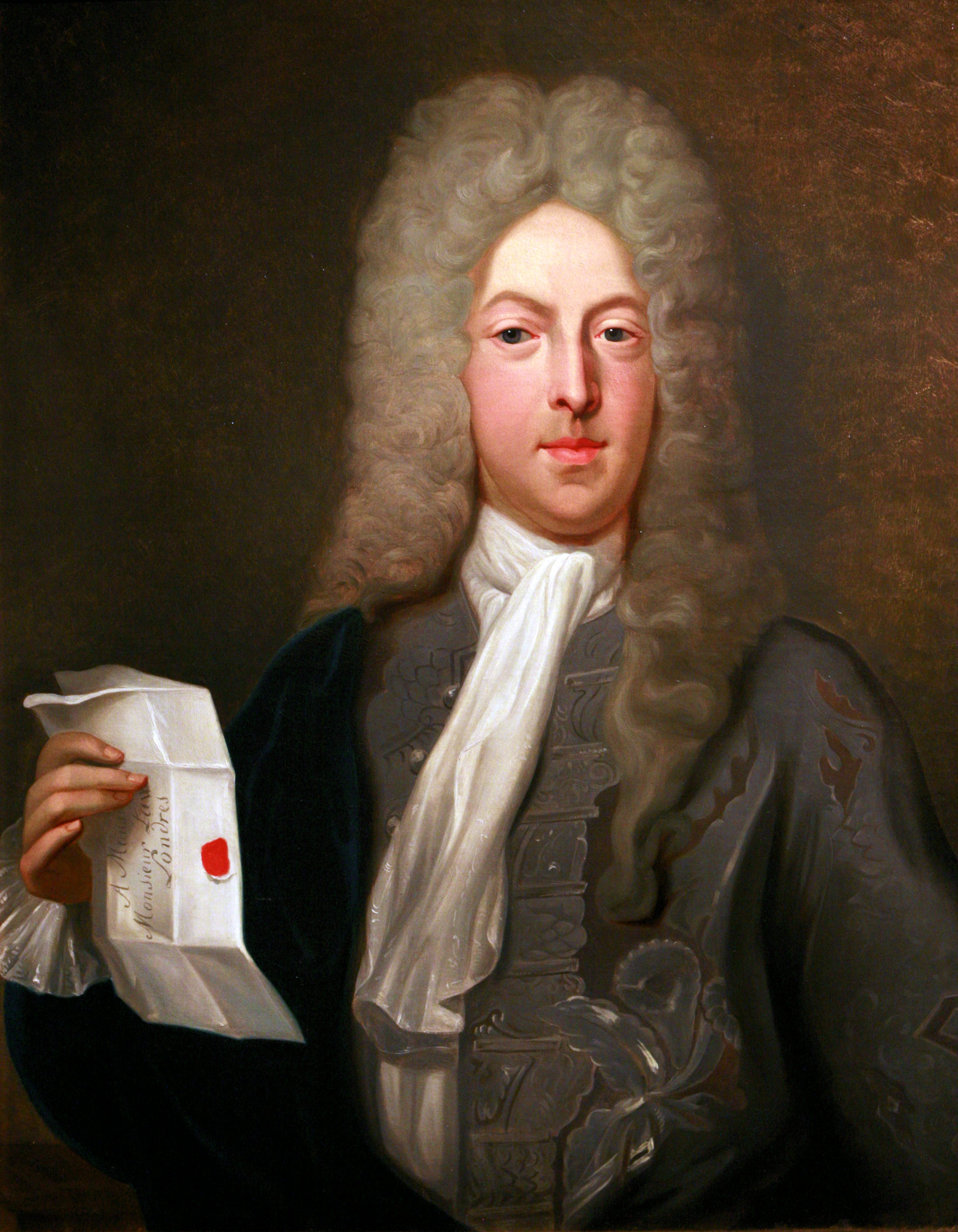
John Law brought many black slaves to Arkansas.

Black people were brought to Arkansas as slaves as part of French colonization in the 1720s. At the time of the first US census of Arkansas in 1810, they numbered 188, comprising roughly 18 percent of the population. The African American population of Arkansas would grow in proportion, comprising 110,000 and 25% of the population in 1860 on the eve of the American Civil War. African Americans lived throughout the state, and were primarily made to work on cotton plantations; some were made to work skilled trades. Living conditions were barely adequate for survival, and African Americans had a mortality rate 30 percent higher than the white population (although the mortality rate in Arkansas was slightly better than the national average for African Americans). Fugitive slaves were common, despite the risk of physical punishment. Little is known about the culture of African Americans of this era, but it is clear that the African American population of this time managed to build cultural institutions and practices.

=== Reconstruction ===
Reconstruction in Arkansas was the period 1865–1874 when the United States government, using the Army, worked to rebuild the South and tried to ensure that the newly freed slaves were granted equal rights and protections under the law. When the Union army occupied the state in 1864, Blacks were granted legal freedom, and many began to work towards economic and social independence. They established their own schools, churches, and businesses, and after 1868 some were even elected to political office. The Republican Party was dominant in Arkansas, and nearly all African Americans supported the party as it was seen as the party of abolition and emancipation. In 1868, the Arkansas State Constitution was rewritten to give Black people the right to vote and hold office, making Arkansas the first former Confederate state to do so. However, the Republican Party was deeply factionalized and spent much of its energy on internal battles. White supremacist groups, such as the Ku Klux Klan, were active in the state and used violence and intimidation to try to suppress Black voting and political power. In 1874, the Democratic Party regained control of the state government, and the era of Reconstruction came to an end. Democrats worked to roll back many of the legal gains that Black people had made during Reconstruction, and Black political power in Arkansas was suppressed for nine decades to come. The Reconstruction era in Arkansas was a time of significant progress for African Americans. Many Black people gained education and skills, and some were able to establish successful farms, businesses and careers. The era also laid the groundwork for future civil rights movements and political activism in the state.

=== Jim Crow Era, 1874–1964 ===
==== Schools ====
After the conservative whites regained control of the state government in 1874, additional state funding for black schools was minimal. In 1912 Julius Rosenwald, multi-millionaire head of Sears, set up a program to fund black schools across the South. His Rosenwald Fund financed 389 public school buildings in forty-five counties in Arkansas. They included classroom buildings, shops, and teachers' homes. It gave $300,000 in an age when few blacks earned more than $100 a year. The famous black educator Booker T. Washington helped Rosenwald design a program that stimulated local support. The state or county government owned and maintained all of the schools, and the land was usually donated by a white landowner. The local community was required to match the grant through cash, materials, or physical labor, so that the community would have a strong continuing commitment to the program. As a result, building campaigns were initiated by local Black leaders.

In addition to the Rosenwald supported public schools, a number of northern Protestant missionary societies provided funds for schools for Blacks, as well as supplying teachers. The American Missionary Association, a northern Protestant charity, set up numerous schools for freed slaves all across the South starting in the Civil War. They operated 53 schools in 1868 in Arkansas. Some closed and the rest merged by 1878. Thus in Arkadelphia, Clark County, the Arkadelphia Baptist Academy was operated by the American Baptist Home Mission Society. The nearby Arkadelphia Presbyterian Academy was operated by the Presbyterian Board of Missions for Freedmen after 1889.

==== Lynching ====
Lynching of African Americans became a major device used by white supremacist to suppress the African American community, under the pretense of law and order. Many killings went unreported, but there are detailed reports for 231 lynchings of Black men in the state from 1860 to 1930.

==== Elaine Massacre, 1919 ====
The Elaine Massacre was a violent racial conflict in 1919 that took place in Elaine, a village in eastern Arkansas with a population of about 400. Trouble began on September 30, 1919, when African American sharecroppers in the area met at a church to discuss ways to demand better prices for their cotton crops. The meeting was held by a local chapter of the Progressive Farmers and Household Union of America, a new organization dedicated to improving the economic and social conditions of black farmers in the South. Word of the meeting spread, and local white planters became concerned that the sharecroppers were organizing to demand better wages and working conditions. A group of white men formed a posse and attacked the sharecroppers at the church. One white man was killed and several injured as the sharecroppers armed themselves and fought back.

The ensuing violence lasted for several days, as white vigilantes and federal troops were brought in to suppress the sharecroppers. Estimates vary, but it is believed that anywhere from 100 to 240 or more African Americans were killed, while five white men were also killed. The aftermath saw hundreds of African Americans arrested. The twelve who were sentenced to death were eventually acquitted after the NAACP sent in a legal team. The massacre was one of the most violent incidents of racial conflict in American history.

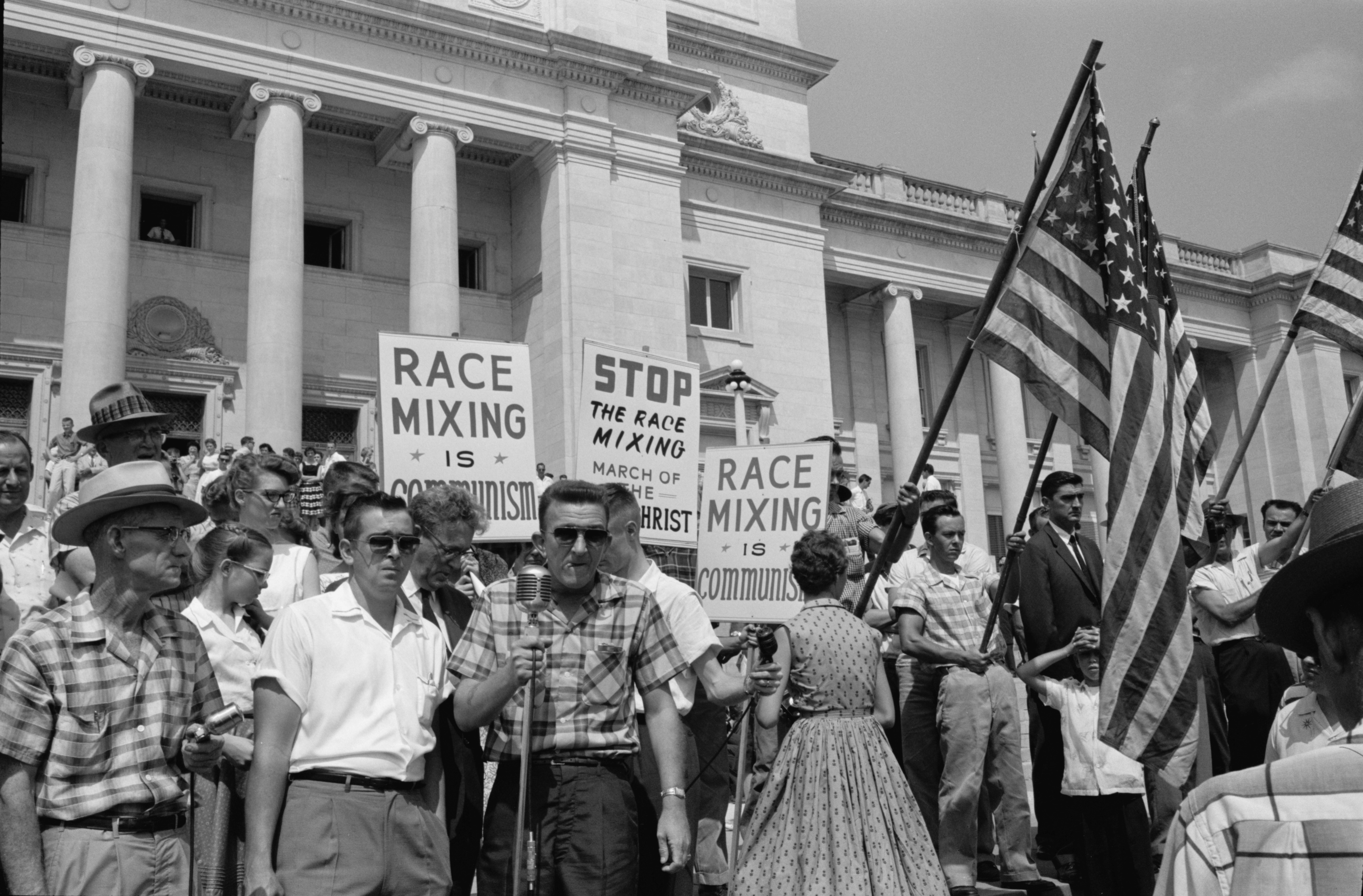
White parents rally against integrating Little Rock's schools in August 1959.

=== Little Rock Nine ===
The Little Rock Nine were a group of nine students who attended segregated black high schools in Little Rock, the capital of Arkansas. They each volunteered when the state NAACP, led by Daisy Bates, obtained federal court orders to integrate the prestigious Little Rock Central High School in September, 1957. The Nine faced intense harassment and threats of violence from white parents and students, as well as organized white supremacy groups. The enraged opposition emphasized miscegenation as the threat to white society.

Arkansas Governor Orval Faubus, claiming his only goal was to preserve the peace, deployed the Arkansas National Guard to prevent Blacks from entering the school. Faubus defied federal court orders, whereupon President Dwight D. Eisenhower intervened. He federalized the Arkansas National Guard and sent them home.

Eisenhower sent in a 1200-man elite Army combat unit to escort the students to school and protect them between classes during the 1957–58 school year. In class, however, the Nine were teased and ridiculed every day. In the city, compromise efforts failed and political tensions continued to fester. A year later in September 1958 the U.S. Supreme Court ruled that all the city's high schools had to be integrated immediately. Governor Faubus and the Arkansas state legislature responded by immediately shutting down all the public high schools in the city for the entire 1958–1959 school year. The decision to integrate the school was a landmark event in the history of civil rights. The city and state were entangled in expensive legal disputes for decades.

=== Since 1965 ===
As of the 2020 U.S. census, African Americans were 15.1% of the state's population.

== Demographics ==
In the 2020 Census, 453,783 Arkansas residents were identified as African American (of the total 3,011,524). In 6 of the state's 75 counties, African Americans make up more than 50% of the population: Phillips (62.4%), Jefferson (56.3%), St. Francis (54.4%), Lee (54.2%), Crittenden (53.8%), and Chicot (53.1%). African Americans in the ten counties of Pulaski (143,548), Jefferson (37,835), Crittenden (25,905), Craighead (18,473), Faulkner (14,384), Mississippi (14,323), Union (12,729), St. Francis (12,561), Miller (10,988), and Saline (10,414) make up more than 66% of all African Americans in the state.

== Notable people ==
- Daisy Bates, NAACP leader
- Bobo Brazil, wrestler
- Big Bill Broonzy, singer
- Mamie Phipps Clark, psychologist
- Milton Crenchaw, Tuskegee flier
- Joycelyn Elders, US Surgeon General
- Silas Herbert Hunt, integration leader
- Louis Jordan, musician
- John H. Johnson, publisher
- Edith Irby Jones, integration leader
- Samuel L. Kountz, surgeon
- Sonny Liston, boxer
- Luenell, actress
- Florence Price, composer
- Rodney E. Slater, cabinet member
- Sister Rosetta Tharpe, singer

== See also ==
- Black Southerners
- Demographics of Arkansas
- History of Arkansas
- List of African-American newspapers in Arkansas
