= Elizabeth Harden Gilmore =

American activist

Elizabeth Harden Gilmore (1909–1986) was a business leader and civil rights advocate.

She was the first woman to be licensed as an assistant funeral director in Kanawha County, West Virginia on October 28, 1938, and as a funeral director on November 12, 1940. She opened the Harden and Harden Funeral Home in 1947 (now listed on the National Register of Historic Places).

She pioneered efforts to integrate West Virginia's schools, housing, and public accommodations and to pass civil rights legislation enforcing such integration. In the early 1950s, before the Brown v. Board of Education decision mandating school desegregation, Gilmore formed a women's club which opened Charleston's first integrated day care center. At about the same time, she succeeded in getting her black Girl Scouts of the USA troop admitted to Camp Anne Bailey near the mountain town of Lewisburg. The two Girl Scouts that she sponsored to integrate Camp Anne Bailey were Deloris Foster and Linda Stillwell. Her Girl Scout Troop, 230 was, also, the first black troop to graduate from Girl Scouting in West Virginia. After co-founding the local chapter of the Congress of Racial Equality (CORE) in 1958, she led CORE in a successful one-year-long sit-in campaign at a local department store called The Diamond.

In the 1960s, Gilmore served on the Kanawha Valley Council of Human Relations, where she participated in forums on racial differences and where she helped black renters, displaced by a new interstate highway, find housing. Her successful push to amend the 1961 state civil rights law won her a seat on the powerful higher-education Board of Regents. Gilmore was the first African American to receive such an honor. She stayed on the Board from 1969 to the late 1970s, serving one term as vice-president and one term as president. Her tireless commitment to civil and human rights did not end there. She was also involved with the U.S. Commission on Civil Rights and community education and welfare committees.
