= African Americans in West Virginia =

West Virginia was created as a result of the American Civil War, with Western Virginians forming a new state after Virginia seceded from the Union. Despite the efforts of individuals like Booker T. Washington, West Virginia did not become a significant haven for slaves and free Blacks. The state's initial constitution included provisions for the gradual elimination of slavery, but it was not until the ratification of the 13th Amendment in 1865 that slavery was completely abolished in West Virginia. The constitutional convention of 1872 in the state guaranteed voting rights, but also introduced a segregationist clause that enforced racial segregation in schools, leading to a society marked by racial stratification and inequality.

== See also ==
- History of slavery in West Virginia
- List of African-American historic places in West Virginia
- List of African American newspapers in West Virginia
