= Sattes, West Virginia =

- Unincorporated community
- Location within West Virginia and the United States Sattes (the United States)
- Coordinates: 38°23′29″N 81°49′6″W
- Country: United States
- State: West Virginia
- County: Kanawha
- Elevation: 597 ft (182 m)
- Time zone: UTC-5 (Eastern (EST))
  - Summer (DST): UTC-4 (EDT)
- GNIS ID: 1546445

Sattes is an unincorporated community in Kanawha County, West Virginia, United States. Its post office is closed.

Sattes got its start when the railroad was extended to that point.
