= Booker T. Washington High School (West Virginia) =

- U.S. National Register of Historic Places
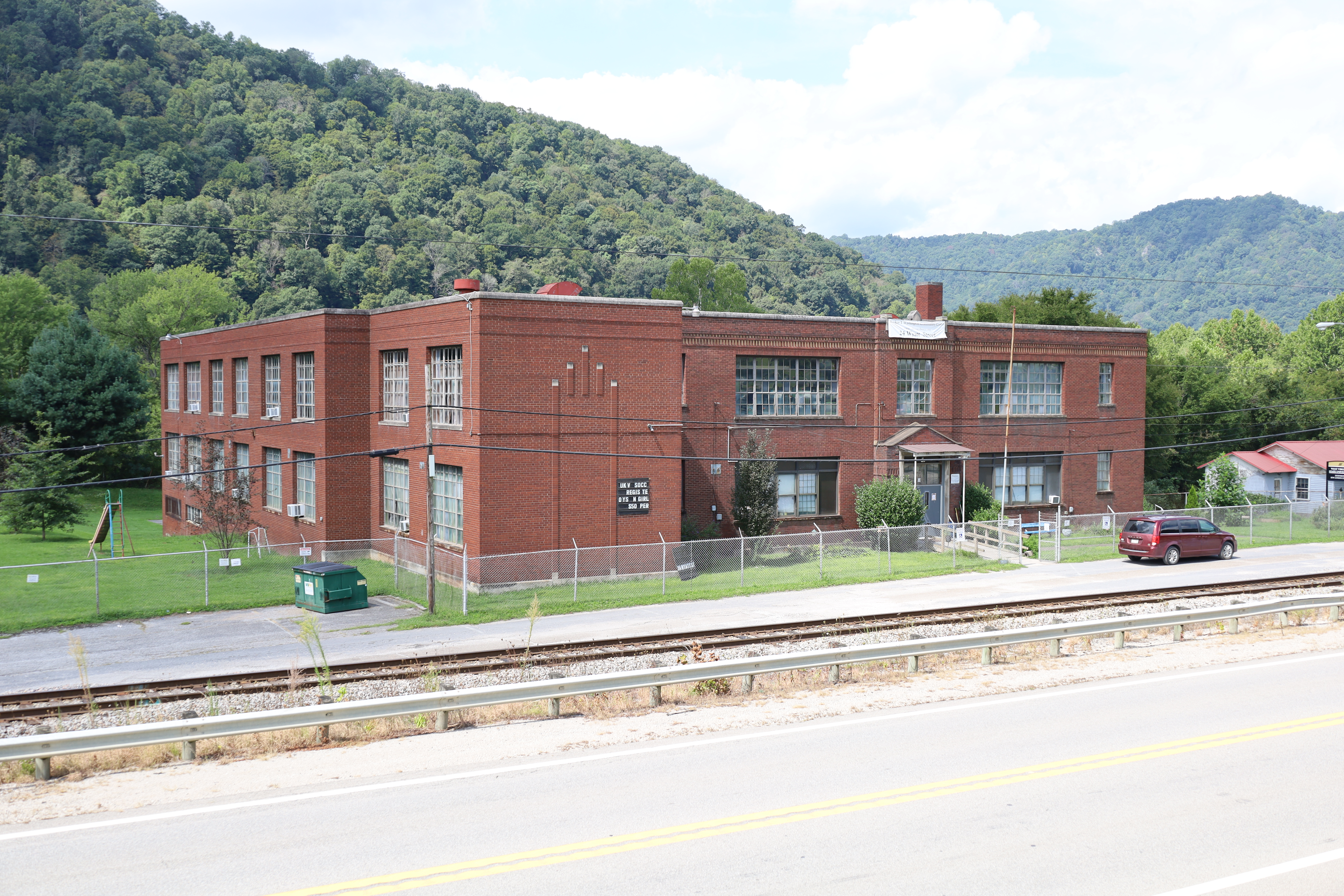
- The building in 2021

- Location within West Virginia Location within the United States
- Location: Wyatt St. off U.S. Route 60, near London, West Virginia
- Coordinates: 38°12′4″N 81°22′17″W
- Area: less than one acre
- Built: 1925
- Architectural style: Moderne
- NRHP reference No.: 99001399
- Added to NRHP: December 3, 1999

Booker T. Washington High School, also known as Grant Junior High School and Grant Elementary, is a historic high school building located near London, Kanawha County, West Virginia. It was built in 1925, and is a two-story, L-shaped wire brick building with a rear section in tile block and brick. It is in the Streamline Moderne style. It was built as a high school for African American children during the period of segregated educational facilities. After desegregation in 1956, it was used as a junior high school, then an elementary school. The school closed in June 1986, and is now used as a community center. It was one of two early high schools for African Americans in Kanawha County.

It was listed on the National Register of Historic Places in 1999.

== See also ==
- List of things named after Booker T. Washington
