= Elizabeth Harden Gilmore House =

Historic house in West Virginia, United States

- U.S. National Register of Historic Places
- U.S. Historic district
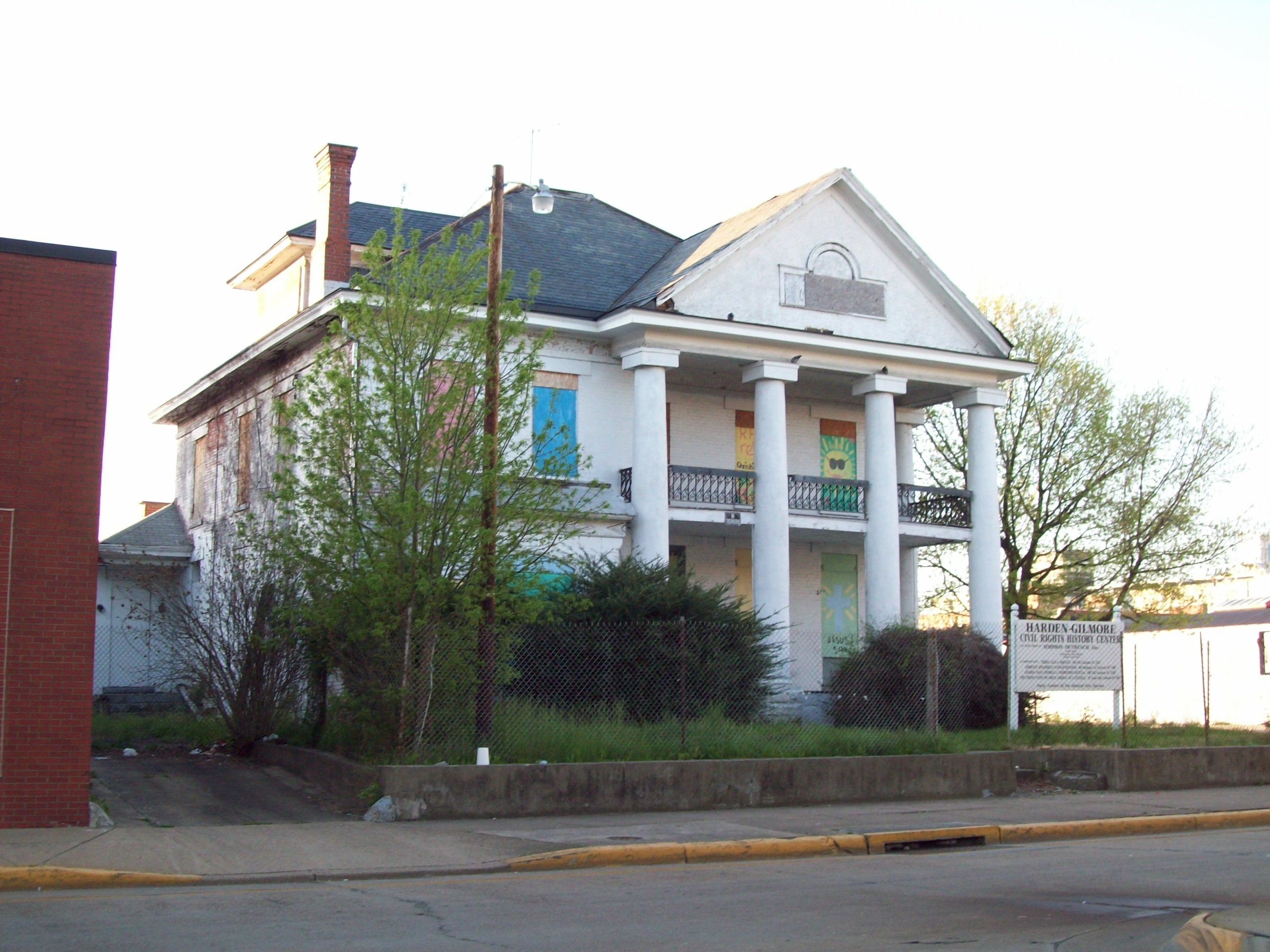
- Gilmore House, April 2009

- Location within West Virginia Location within the United States
- Location: 514 Broad St. (now Leon Sullivan Way), Charleston, West Virginia
- Coordinates: 38°21′3″N 81°37′39″W
- Built: 1900
- Architectural style: Classical Revival
- NRHP reference No.: 88001462
- Added to NRHP: September 17, 1988

Elizabeth Harden Gilmore House, also known as Minotti-Gilmore House or Harden and Harden Funeral Home, is a historic home and national historic district located at Charleston, West Virginia. It is a 2 1/2-story, Classical Revival brick detached residential dwelling built by 1900 on an approximately one-half acre lot in a business area of town. It features a columned portico and has undergone some alteration and deterioration. It was the home and location of a funeral home operated by Elizabeth Gilmore, a prominent African American in the Kanawha Valley.

It was listed on the National Register of Historic Places in 1988.
