= Mt. Pleasant School (Gerrardstown, West Virginia) =

- U.S. National Register of Historic Places
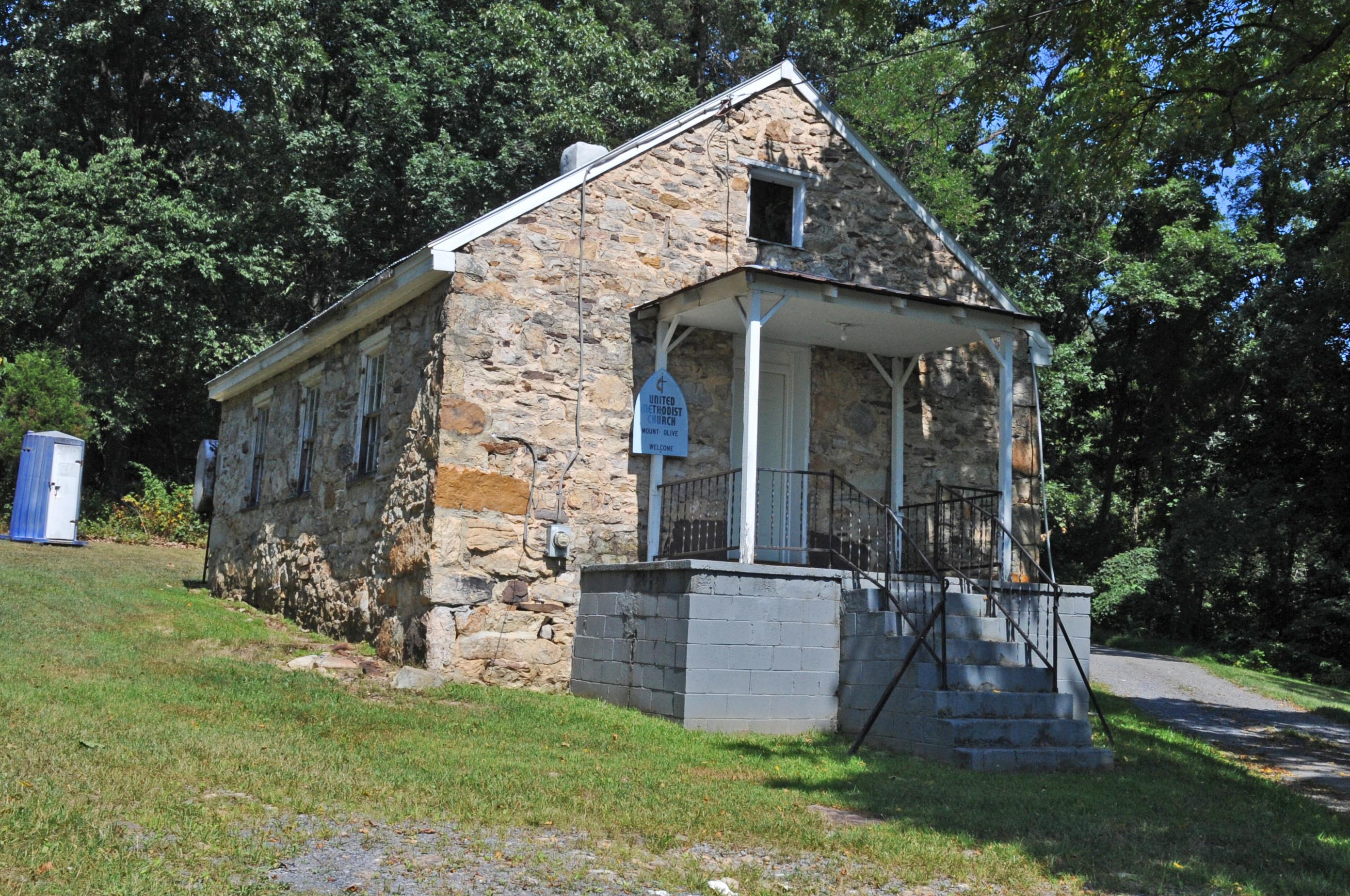

- Location within West Virginia Location within the United States
- Location: Abiding Way, near Gerrardstown, West Virginia
- Coordinates: 39°21′49″N 78°7′28″W
- Area: less than one acre
- Built: c. 1897
- Architectural style: Gable-front
- NRHP reference No.: 08000928
- Added to NRHP: September 18, 2008

Mt. Pleasant School, now known as Mt. Olive Methodist Church, is a historic one-room school building located near Gerrardstown, Berkeley County, West Virginia. It was built about 1897 and is a one-story, gable roofed vernacular building. It measures approximately 24 feet wide and 39 feet deep. The exterior is finished in native random ashlar limestone. It is built into the slope of the hillside, and features a raised front porch. The school was built for African American children. It ceased use as a school in 1939 and began use as a church in 1942.

It was listed on the National Register of Historic Places in 2008.
