= London, West Virginia =

Unincorporated community in West Virginia, US

- Unincorporated community
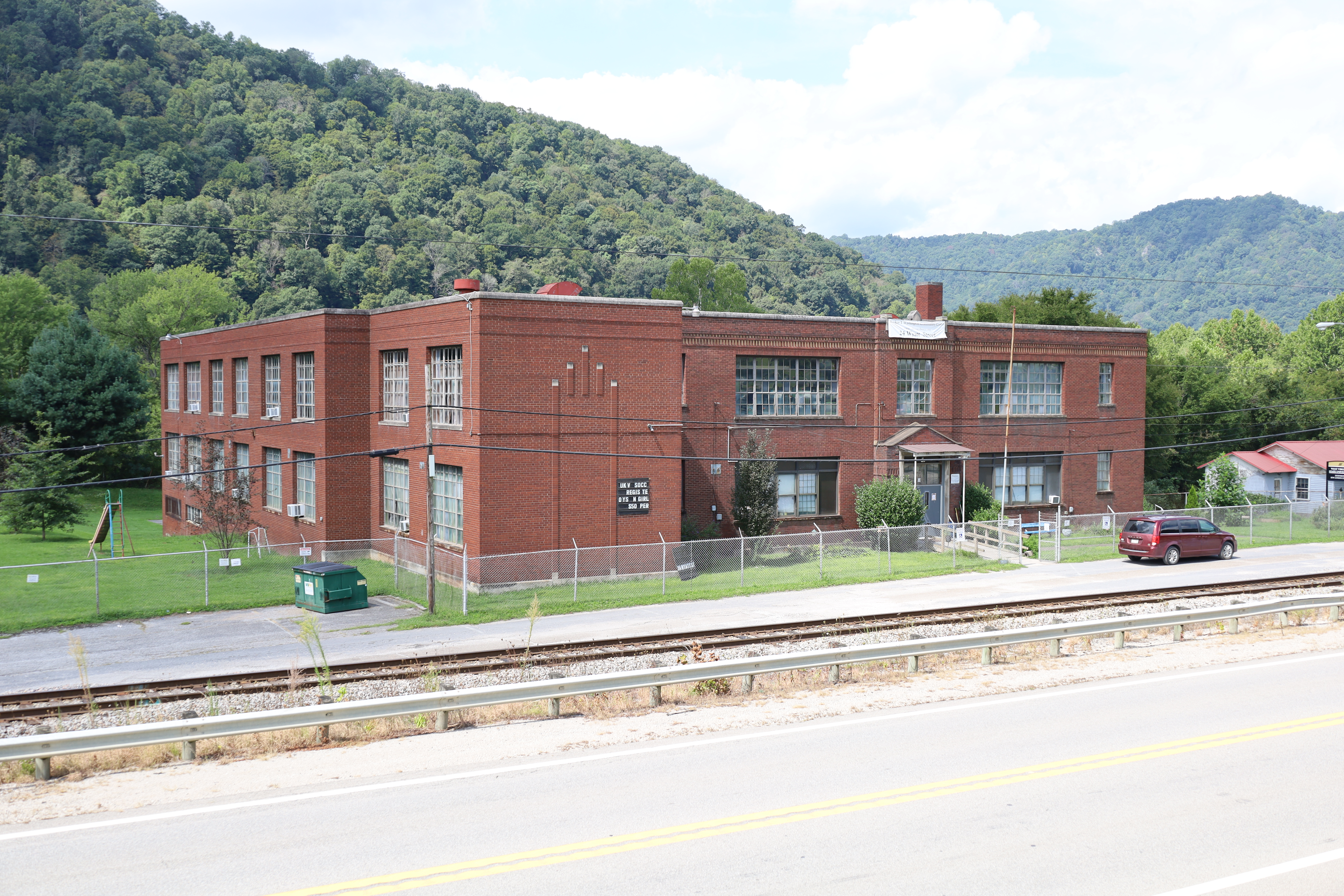
- Booker T. Washington Community Center in 2021

- Location within West Virginia and the United States London (the United States)
- Coordinates: 38°11′40″N 81°22′07″W
- Country: United States
- State: West Virginia
- County: Kanawha
- Time zone: UTC-5 (Eastern (EST))
  - Summer (DST): UTC-4 (EDT)
- ZIP code: 25126
- Area codes: 304 and 681

London is an unincorporated community in Kanawha County in the U.S. state of West Virginia, located 25 miles from the state capital of Charleston. London Lock and Dam, operated by US Army Corps of Engineers is located here on Kanawha River.

Located in London is the former Booker T. Washington High School, listed on the National Register of Historic Places in 1999. John Wesley Conley (1820–1874), the grandfather of historian Phil Conley, died in London.
