= Timeline of Wheeling, West Virginia =

The following is a timeline of the history of the city of Wheeling, West Virginia, US.

== 18th century ==
- 1769 – Wheeling founded by Ebenezer Zane.
- 1774 – Fort Fincastle built.
- 1777 – September: Siege of Fort Henry "by a large force of Indians."
- 1782 – September: Attempted siege on fort by "about 40 British regular soldiers and about 250 Indians."
- 1793 – Town grid laid out.
- 1795 – Town incorporated.
- 1797 – Wheeling becomes seat of Ohio County.
- 1798 – Shepherd Hall (residence) built.

== 19th century ==
- 1806 – George Miller becomes town mayor.
- 1807 – Wheeling Library Company founded.
- 1814 – Linsly Institute for boys founded.
- 1817 – Elm Grove Stone Arch Bridge built.
- 1818
  - National Road begins operating.
  - Va. North-Western Gazette newspaper begins publication.
- 1821 – Glass manufacturing begins.
- 1834 – Wheeling Water Works established.
- 1836
  - City chartered.
  - Moses W. Chapline becomes city mayor.
- 1840 – Population: 7,885.
- 1848 – Wheeling Female Academy and Wheeling Lyceum established.
- 1849
  - Wheeling Suspension Bridge opens.
  - Nail manufacturing begins.
- 1850
  - Roman Catholic Diocese of Wheeling established.
  - Population: 11,435.
- 1852 – Baltimore and Ohio Railroad built.
- 1853
  - Wheeling Hospital established.
  - Iron Market House in business.
- 1859 – Wheeling Library Association established.
- 1860 – Population: 14,083.
- 1861
  - January: Andrew J. Sweeney becomes mayor.
  - May: First Wheeling Convention held.
  - June: Second Wheeling Convention held.
- 1863
  - June 20
    - Wheeling becomes capital of the new state of West Virginia.
    - West Virginia Legislature convenes.
  - Daily Register newspaper begins publication.
- 1865 – St. Joseph's Academy for girls established.
- 1866 – Greenwood Cemetery established.
- 1870
  - West Virginia capital relocated from Wheeling to Charleston.
  - Population: 19,280.
- 1875 – Wheeling becomes capital of West Virginia again.
- 1879 – Bloch Brothers in business.
- 1880 – Population: 30,737.
- 1882 – Wheeling Public Library established.
- 1883 – Soldiers and Sailors Monument dedicated.
- 1884 – Ohio River flood.
- 1885 – West Virginia capital relocated from Wheeling to Charleston again.
- 1890
  - City Hospital established.
  - Population: 34,522.
- 1897 – Cathedral Parish School built.
- 1898 – March 26: Ohio River flood.
- 1900 – Population: 38,878.

== 20th century ==
- 1904 – Victoria Theater in business.
- 1907 – March 15: Ohio River flood.
- 1910 – Population: 41,641.
- 1913 – March 28: Ohio River flood.
- 1915 – Rex Theater in business.
- 1917 – Liberty Theatre in business.
- 1922 – Lincoln Theater in business.
- 1926
  - WWVA radio begins broadcasting.
  - Wheeling Area Historical Society founded.
- 1928
  - Oglebay Park established.
  - Madonna of the Trail monument dedicated.
  - Capitol Theatre in business.
- 1929 – Wheeling Country Day School incorporated.
- 1930 – Oglebay Institute established.
- 1933 – Ohio County Public Library active.
- 1935 – Wheeling News-Register newspaper in publication.
- 1936
  - March 19: Ohio River flood.
  - City centennial.
- 1937 – January 26: Ohio River flood of 1937.
- 1942 – December 21: Ohio River flood.
- 1950 – February 9, 1950: Senator Joseph R. McCarthy made the "Enemies Within" speech before the Ohio County Women's Republican Club
- 1952 – October 23: US president Truman visits city during election campaign.
- 1953 – WTRF-TV (television) begins broadcasting.
- 1955 – Fort Henry Bridge and Jesuit Wheeling College open.
- 1970 – Wheeling Area Genealogical Society founded.
- 1976 – Wheeling Park High School established.
- 1977 – Oglebay's Good Zoo established.
- 1983 – Alan Mollohan becomes U.S. representative for West Virginia's 1st congressional district.
- 1992 - Wheeling Thunderbirds (later renamed to Wheeling Nailers in 1996) plays first hockey game at Civic Center.
- 1988 - Aetnaville Bridge closes to traffic on Wheeling Island
- 1996 - Ohio River floods, reaches 45.4 flood stage in January
- 1999 - Suspension Bridge is renovated for 150th birthday.

== 21st century ==
- 2001 - Wheeling Heritage Port opens to the public.
- 2004 - remnants of Hurricane Ivan causes widespread flooding in the area in September. The Ohio River flooded reaching 45.4 feet.
- 2005 - significant rainfall causes the Ohio River to flood again on January 7, reaching 42.1 feet.
- 2008 – Andy McKenzie becomes mayor.
- 2010 – Population: 28,486 city; 147,950 metro.
- 2011 – David McKinley becomes U.S. representative for West Virginia's 1st congressional district.
- 2016 – Glenn Elliott elected mayor.
- 2019 - Ohio Valley Medical Center closes on September 4.
- 2019-2022 - $214 million dollar renovation of 26 bridges along I-70 in Wheeling takes place.
- 2024 - Denny Magruder elected mayor
- 2025 - 9 people die in flash flooding along Little Wheeling Creek in Triadelphia and Ohio County.

== See also ==
- Wheeling, West Virginia history
- List of mayors of Wheeling, West Virginia
- National Register of Historic Places listings in Ohio County, West Virginia
- Other cities in West Virginia:
  - Timeline of Charleston, West Virginia
  - Timeline of Huntington, West Virginia

== Bibliography ==
=== published in 19th c. ===
- J.B. Bowen (1839), Wheeling Directory and Advertiser, Wheeling: John M. M'Creary, Printer, OCLC 3456530, OL 23720924M
- "Wheeling". Kimball & James' Business Directory for the Mississippi Valley. Cincinnati: Printed by Kendall & Barnard. 1844. hdl:2027/chi.20799213 – via HathiTrust.
- "Wheeling, Va.". Commercial Gazetteer and Business Directory of the Ohio River. Indianapolis: G.W. Hawes. 1861.
- "Wheeling". Commercial Directory of the Western States. St. Louis: Richard Edwards. 1867.
- "Ohio River: Wheeling". James' River Guide...Mississippi Valley. Cincinnati: U.P. James. 1871.
- "Wheeling". Wiggins and Weaver's Ohio River Directory. Cleveland: Fairbanks, Benedict & Company. 1871.
- J.H. Newton; G.G. Nichols; A.G. Sprankle (1879). "Wheeling: Past and Present". History of the Pan-handle: Being Historical Collections of the Counties of Ohio, Brooke, Marshall and Hancock, West Virginia. Wheeling: J.A. Caldwell.
- George E. Waring, Jr.; U.S. Department of the Interior, Census Office (1887), "West Virginia: Wheeling", Report on the Social Statistics of Cities: Southern and the Western States, Washington DC: Government Printing Office, pp. 87–92
- "Wheeling" . Encyclopædia Britannica. Vol. 24 (9th ed.). 1888.
- White & Allen, ed. (1891). Laws and Ordinances for the Government of the City of Wheeling, West Virginia. Printed by the West Virginia Printing Company.

=== published in 20th c. ===
- John J. Coniff, ed. (1901). Laws and Ordinances for the Government of the City of Wheeling, West Virginia.
- "Wheeling" . Encyclopædia Britannica. Vol. 28 (11th ed.). 1910. p. 586.
- Charles A. Wingerter. History of Greater Wheeling and Vicinity. Chicago: Lewis Publishing Company, 1912.
- Thomas Condit Miller; Hu Maxwell (1913). "Wheeling". West Virginia and Its People. New York: Lewis Historical Publishing Company.
- "Wheeling". Automobile Blue Book. Vol. 3. New York: Automobile Blue Book Publishing Co. 1920. hdl:2027/pst.000052908583 – via HathiTrust.
- Federal Writers' Project (1941). "Wheeling". West Virginia: A Guide to the Mountain State. American Guide Series. New York: Oxford University Press. ISBN 9781603540476 – via Google Books. + chronology
- Kenneth R. Nodyne; Densis E. Lawther (1981). The Wheeling Area: An Annotated Bibliography. West Virginia University Library.
- Minder, Mike. Wheeling’s Gambling History to 1976. Wheeling: Nail City Publishing, 1997.

=== published in 21st c. ===
- Fones-Wolf, Ken, “‘Traitors in Wheeling’: Secessionism in an Appalachian Unionist City,” Journal of Appalachian Studies, 13 (Spring–Fall 2007), 75–95. JSTOR 41446778.
- Duffy, Sean, & Rinkes, Paul, Wheeling: Then & Now. Mount Pleasant, S. Carolina: Arcadia Publishing, 2010.
