= Timeline of Huntington, West Virginia =

The following is a timeline of the history of the city of Huntington, West Virginia, USA.

== Timeline ==
=== 18th century ===
- 1775 - First permanent settlement in modern-day Huntington was founded as "Holderby's Landing".

=== 19th century ===
- 1837 - Marshall University is founded as Marshall Academy.
- 1871
  - Huntington incorporated; named after businessman Collis P. Huntington who initiated town planning.
  - Peter Cline Buffington elected mayor.
- 1872
  - Huntington Argus newspaper begins publication.
  - First Congregational Church founded.
- 1873
  - Chesapeake and Ohio Railway begins operating.
  - Huntington station opens.
- 1874
  - Spring Hill Cemetery opens.
  - Huntington Advertiser newspaper in publication.
- 1880 - Population: 3,174.
- 1885 - Davis Opera House built.
- 1887
  - Seat of Cabell County relocates to Huntington from Barboursville.
  - Railroad depot built.
- 1888 - Ohio River Railroad (Wheeling-Huntington) begins operating.
- 1890 - Population: 10,108.
- 1891 - Guyandotte becomes part of Huntington.
- 1893 - "Central City" incorporated near Huntington.
- 1898 - The Parthenon opens.
- 1899 - Cabell County Courthouse opens.
- 1900 - Ohio Valley Electric Railway begins operating.

=== 20th century ===
- 1901 - Cabell County Courthouse dedicated.
- 1903
  - Carnegie Public Library opens.
  - Camden Park opens.
- 1905
  - Heiner's Bakery opens.
  - United States Post Office and Court House opens.
- 1907 - Old Main opens.
- 1908 - Huntington purchases the lands for the future project Ritter Park.
- 1909
  - Central City becomes part of Huntington.
  - Herald-Dispatch newspaper in publication.
- 1910
  - St. Cloud Commons opens.
  - Liggett and Myers Tobacco Company opens.
  - Population: 31,161.
- 1912 - Barnett Hospital and Nursing School opens.
- 1913
  - March 30: Ohio River flood.
  - Ritter Park, is created.
- 1915 - Huntington City Hall was built.
- 1916 - Old Huntington High School opens.
- 1917 - Liggett and Myers Tobacco factory built.
- 1919 - Simms School Building opens.
- 1920 - Population: 50,177.
- 1923 - West Virginia Colored Children's Home opens.
- 1924
  - Foster Memorial Home opens.
  - Memorial Arch is built.
  - St. Mary's Hospital opens.
  - St. Joseph Central Catholic High School is established.
- 1925
  - Ohev Sholom Temple is built.
  - West Virginia Building is built.
- 1926 - Tivoli Theatre in business.
- 1927 - WSAZ radio begins broadcasting.
- 1928
  - Keith-Albee Theatre in business.
  - Fairfield Stadium opens.
- 1929 - Rotary Park Bridge is built.
- 1930
  - Rotary Park Bridge built.
  - Population: 75,572.
- 1935 - Flood.
- 1936 - Huntington Junior College established.
- 1937 - The Ohio River flood of 1937 occurs.
- 1939 - Barnett Hospital and Nursing School closes.
- 1941 - Beverly Theatre in business.
- 1949 - WSAZ-TV television begins broadcasting.
- 1950
  - Veterans Memorial Fieldhouse (arena) opens.
  - Population: 86,353.
- 1952 - Tri-State Airport opens.
- 1954 - WCHS-TV opens.
- 1955
  - WHTN-TV (television) begins broadcasting.
  - WOWK-TV opens.
- 1956
  - Cabell Huntington Hospital opens.
  - Huntington Hornets is founded.
- 1957 - Huntington Hornets disbanded.
- 1961 - Marshall University active.
- 1968 - Cabell-Wayne Historical Society founded.
- 1969 - West Virginia Public Broadcasting opens.
- 1970
  - November 14: Airplane crash occurs near city; Marshall University football team among the fatalities.
  - West Huntington Bridge built.
- 1971 - Kanawha Valley Regional Transportation Authority opens.
- 1972 - Tri-State Transit Authority opens.
- 1977
  - Huntington Civic Center (arena) opens.
  - University's Joan C. Edwards School of Medicine established.
  - Nick Rahall becomes U.S. representative for West Virginia's 4th congressional district.
- 1978 - Beech Fork State Park is founded.
- 1980 - Population: 63,684.
- 1981
  - Cam Henderson Center opens.
  - Huntington Mall opens.
  - WVAH-TV is founded.
- 1983
  - Huntington Area Food Bank established.
  - Huntington station is rebuilt.
  - WTSF opens.
- 1984
  - Harris Riverfront Park opens.
  - WQCW opens.
- 1985
  - East Huntington Bridge opens.
  - City adopts "strong mayor" style of government.
- 1987 - Huntington Museum of Art opens.
- 1988 - WLPX-TV opens.
- 1990
  - Huntington Cubs is founded.
  - Fairfield Stadium closes.
- 1991
  - Joan C. Edwards Stadium opens.
  - Museum of Radio and Technology opens.
- 1993
  - Huntington Blizzard is founded.
  - Masonic Temple opens.
  - Owens-Illinois Glass Co. manufactory shuts down.
- 1994
  - Cabell Midland High School opens.
  - Robert C. Byrd Bridge to Chesapeake, Ohio opens.
  - The Huntington Cubs disband.
- 1996
  - Heritage Farm Museum and Village opens.
  - Huntington High School opens.
  - Old Huntington High School closes.
  - Sam Hood Field opens.
- 1998 - Spring Valley High School opens.
- 2000
  - City website online (approximate date).
  - Huntington Blizzard moves to Beaumont Texas and remains as the Wildcatters.
  - Port of Huntington Tri-State opens.

=== 21st century ===
- 2001 - David Felinton becomes the youngest mayor in Huntington, West Virginia history.
- 2003 - Marshall Commons, opens.
- 2004
  - Fairfield Stadium is demolished.
  - Pullman Square is built.
  - Tsubasacon starts.
- 2006
  - Fictional but based on true events We Are Marshall movie released (set in Huntington).
  - Huntington Heroes is founded.
- 2007 - Robert C. Byrd Biotechnology Science Center opens.
- 2008
  - Dot Hicks Field opens.
  - Huntington Heroes disbands.
- 2009
  - Kim Wolfe becomes mayor.
  - The Marshall Rec Center opens.
  - Huntington Prep School is founded.
- 2010 - Population: 49,138.
- 2011
  - Huntington Hammer is founded.
  - West Virginia Colored Children's Home is demolished.
- 2012
  - Huntington Hammer disbanded.
  - Sam Hood Field closes.
  - Veterans Memorial Fieldhouse closes.
- 2013
  - Stephen T. Williams becomes mayor.
  - Veterans Memorial Soccer Complex opens.
- 2014 - Chris Cline Athletic Complex opens.
- 2015 - Evan Jenkins U.S. representative for West Virginia's 3rd congressional district.
- 2024
  - Jack Cook Field opens.
  - Tri-State Coal Cats is founded.

== See also ==
- Huntington history
- List of mayors of Huntington, West Virginia
- National Register of Historic Places listings in Cabell County, West Virginia
- Other cities in West Virginia:
  - Timeline of Charleston, West Virginia
  - Timeline of Wheeling, West Virginia

== Bibliography ==
- J.H. Chataigne, ed. (1882). "Huntington". Chesapeake & Ohio Railway Directory. Richmond, VA. pp. 366–370. OCLC 23244118. Archived from the original on August 2, 2023.
- "Huntington". West Virginia State Gazetteer and Business Directory. Detroit: R.L. Polk & Co. 1882.
- Huntington (West Virginia) Directory, Potts & Cammack, 1891
- Charter of the City of Huntington, West Virginia. 1909. Archived from the original on March 8, 2017.
- Lucius H. Cammack, ed. (1916). Huntington. Huntington Chamber of Commerce.
- Federal Writers' Project (1941). "Huntington". West Virginia: A Guide to the Mountain State. American Guide Series. New York: Oxford University Press. pp. 235+. ISBN 9781603540476. Archived from the original on August 2, 2023 – via Google Books.
- George S. Wallace. Huntington through 75 Years. Huntington: 1947.
- Doris C. Miller. Centennial History of Huntington. Huntington Centennial Commission, 1971.
- James E. Casto. Huntington: An Illustrated History. Huntington: Chapman Printing, 1997.
- Huntington. Images of America. Charleston, SC: Arcadia. 2003. ISBN 978-0-7385-1599-1. Archived from the original on August 2, 2023.
- Lola Roush Miller (2006). Central City. Images of America. Charleston, SC: Arcadia. ISBN 978-1-4396-1726-7. Archived from the original on August 2, 2023.
- Huntington. Then & Now. Charleston, SC: Arcadia. 2010. ISBN 978-0-7385-6667-2. Archived from the original on August 2, 2023.
- James E. Casto (2013). Legendary Locals of Huntington. Charleston, SC: Arcadia.
- "Lost Huntington", Herald-Dispatch, Huntington, August 2023, archived from the original on March 28, 2017. Circa 2014- (Series of articles)
- James E. Casto. Lost Huntington, Recalling Vanished Landmarks. Drummond Press. Jacksonville, Florida, 2015.
- Jack L. Dickinson; Alison K. Summer-Ramirez (2016), Historic Huntington Businesses: the Birth of Huntington, W. Va. 1871-1900, Marshall University Libraries, archived from the original on March 8, 2017
