= Roads in Charleston, West Virginia =

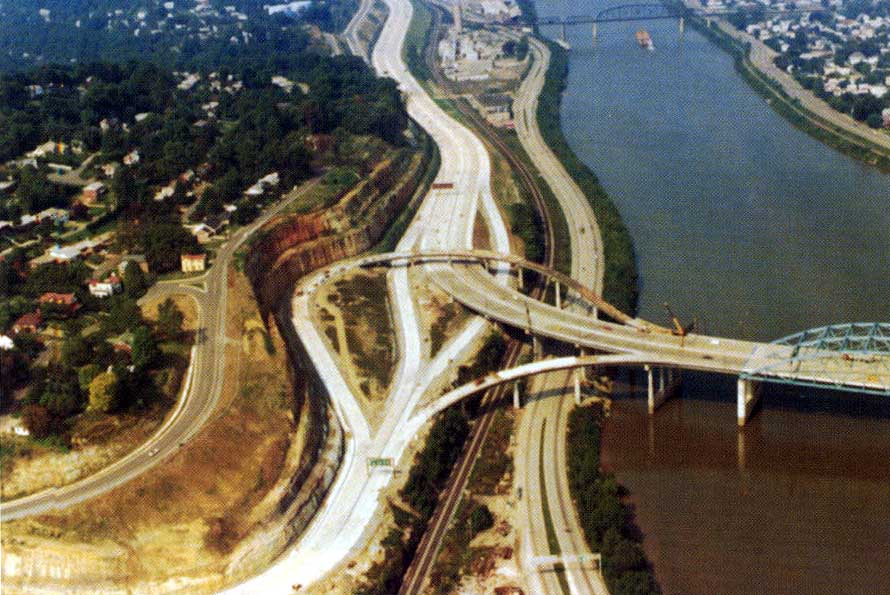
The U.S. Route 119 (Corridor G) Fort Hill interchange under construction in 1973 in Charleston, West Virginia.

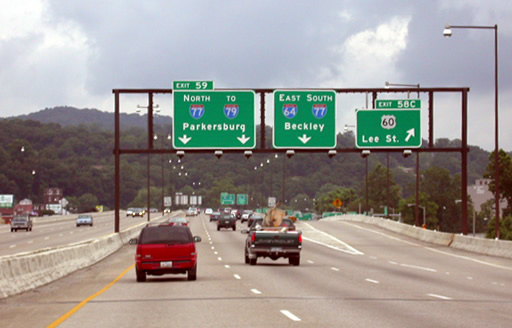
Interstate 64 along the viaduct in Charleston, West Virginia.

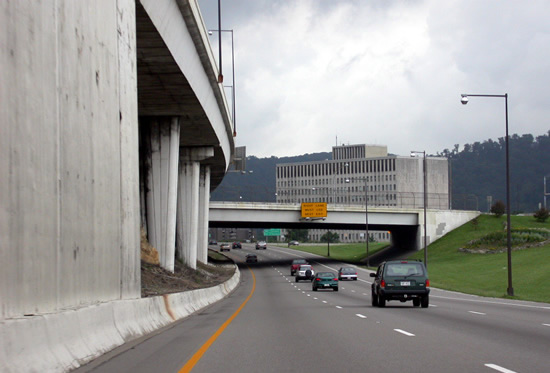
Interstate 64 and Interstate 77 at the WV 114 three-level interchange in Charleston, West Virginia. The westbound/northbound lanes are to the left, cantalivered at times, over the eastbound/southbound lanes.

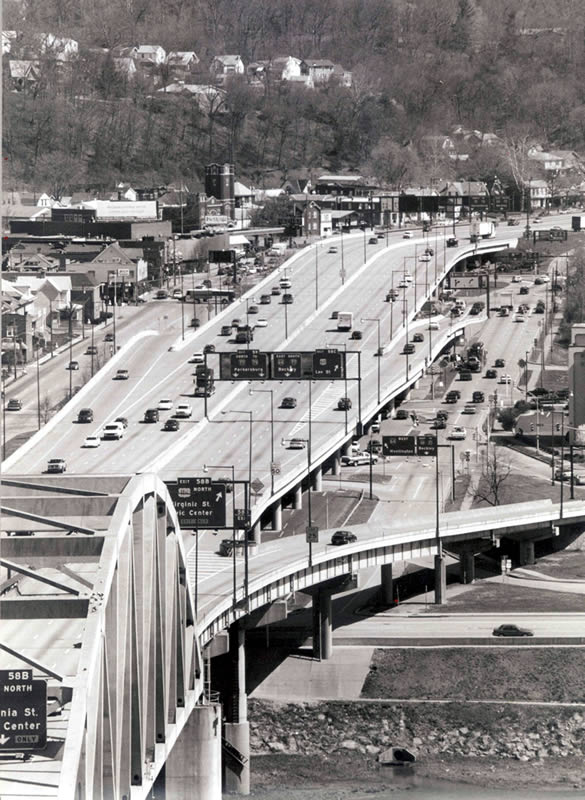
The Interstate 64 viaduct in downtown Charleston, West Virginia.

The roads of Charleston, West Virginia, include three major interstate highways, several U.S. highways and state routes, and numerous major thoroughfares.

== Interstates ==
=== Interstate 64 ===
Planning for the routing of Interstate 64, as well as for Interstate 77 and Interstate 79 through Charleston, was embroiled in controversy since the 1950s. Several alignments were considered which included a northern arc around the Charleston metro area, a downtown route and a southern arc south of South Charleston.

The original intent for Interstate 64 was to drive it through the Triangle District just west of downtown, an urban blight at the time that was home to high crime rates and was referred to as the "Red Light District." By late 1971, the decision was made to route the interstate through the Triangle District, despite much opposition.

In September 1971, work began on Interstate 64 through Charleston. Parts of 14 mountains were cut away; over 1,000 homes were demolished on the south bank of the Kanawha River. The Fort Hill project, named for the hill that lies behind the US 119 (Corridor G) interchange, became one of the largest earth-moving projects on the North American continent up to that point.

Segments opened in 1974; in 1975, the Fort Hill interchange opened, along with the Triangle District viaduct and the third Interstate 64 Kanawha River crossing. Another steel girder bridge, the second Kanawha River crossing along the interstate, was the largest in the United States at that time.

The remainder of the interstate opened in 1976.

=== Interstate 77 ===
Interstate 77 enters the city at the Interstate 79 interchange along the Elk River. The highway turns due south along a variable six lane expressway. The junction with Interstate 64, constructed in 1975, is a three-level junction that spans local streets and is the largest interchange in West Virginia with piers embedded in buildings, over water, and over nearby streets.

One year later, Interstate 77 from the Interstate 64 junction to the West Virginia Turnpike was opened to traffic. This last segment of interstate with Charleston includes a cantilevered three level segment and several flyovers and bridges that span the adjacent Kanawha River. It is also part of the backdrop for the state capitol complex.

=== Interstate 79 ===
Interstate 79 briefly enters the Charleston metropolitan area. In 1979, the interstate's final segment in West Virginia was constructed from Exit 9 to the Interstate 77 interchange. The large directional-Y interchange with Interstate 77 is adjacent to the Elk River.

=== West Virginia Turnpike ===
The northern terminus of the West Virginia Turnpike is in Charleston, ending at the Exit 95 for WV 61 (MacCorkle Avenue). The northern terminus was originally a trumpet interchange with a toll-booth, however, this was reconstructed into a modified trumpet-flyover interchange to enable connections west with the then-new Interstate 64/Interstate 77 concurrency east of the Capitol Complex.

== U.S. highways ==
=== U.S. Route 35 ===
US 35 enters the Charleston metro area near Winfield. From West Virginia Route 34 in Winfield to I-64 US 35 has been realigned to a new four-lane freeway in Putnam County. The former path US 35 followed from Winfield to St. Albans is now signed as West Virginia Route 817. The route currently terminates on I-64 at Exit 40.

=== U.S. Route 60 ===
US 60 enters via MacCorkle Avenue from St. Albans and proceeds east through South Charleston. It intersects the Dunbar Bridge and then passes under the Interstate 64 Kanawha River crossing; in the middle is the WV 601 intersection. It then crosses through an industrialized region of the Kanawha valley lined with chemical facilities and manufacturing plants before intersecting WV 61. US 60 turns north to cross the Kanawha River and becomes Patrick Street; MacCorkle Avenue continues along WV 61.

US 60 continues north along Patrick Street before heading east towards downtown along Washington Street. At the intersection with Edgewood Drive, US 60 eastbound splits towards Lee Street while US 60 westbound utilizes Washington Street in a one-way pair. At Pennsylvania Avenue, US 60 intersects US 119 and the Interstate 64 viaduct before crossing the Kanawha River to enter downtown Charleston.

At Brooks Street, Lee Street rejoins Washington Street to WV 114 (Greenbrier Street), where US 60 turns south for two blocks and heads east along Kanawha Boulevard. It passes by the West Virginia State Capitol and interchanges with US 60 east of the Daniel Boone Park along the Kanawha River.

=== U.S. Route 119/Corridor G ===
U.S. Route 119 formerly did not travel through South Charleston, however, it was signed along Oakhurst and Oakwood Roads when segments of Corridor G were being completed south of the city in the 1970s. In 1975, the segment to Interstate 64 to Oakwood Road opened to traffic. This included the flyover ramp from US 119 to the Interstate 64 interchange. The segment between the WV 601 interchange to Oakwood Road in Charleston would be completed in 1986.

== State routes ==
=== West Virginia Route 25 ===
WV Route 25 begins at Iowa Street on the West Side of Charleston. It then moves through North Charleston as a 4 lane known as 7th Avenue. Upon leaving Charleston city limits, it follows Dunbar Avenue, 10th Street, and Fairlawn Ave, going through the city of Dunbar and the community of Institute. After it passes through Institute, route 25 becomes 1st Avenue as it travels through Nitro. The route ends at the Putnam County community of Rock Branch at the junction with Route 62.

=== West Virginia Route 62 ===
Route 62 begins just outside of Charleston city limits between North Charleston and Dunbar. The road follows what used to be Route 35, before it was moved to the south side of the river. The road continues through the community of Cross Lanes, into the city of Nitro, and through the community of Rock Branch. At this point the road begins to follow the north side of the Kanawha River & then heads north to the bridge crossing at Pomeroy, OH. From this point WV 62 shares old US route 33 status, due US Route 33 being rerouted north from Ripley, which is now the terminus of 62.

=== West Virginia Route 114 ===
WV 114 begins at US 60 (Washington Street) adjacent to the West Virginia Cultural Center and West Virginia State Capitol. It proceeds north as a four-lane highway, interchanging with Interstate 64 and Interstate 77 at a three-level junction. WV 114 assumes steep grades with varying curves until the junction with Yeager Airport's access road, where it becomes two lanes to its terminus at Interstate 79 near Big Chimney.

=== West Virginia Route 501 ===
Route 501 Follows Big Tyler Road from its junction with route 62 to its junction with route 622 at Rocky Fork Road. It travels through the community of Tyler Mountain.

=== West Virginia Route 622 ===
WV 622 begins at Interstate 77 at old US 21, now WV Secondary 21 near Pocatalico, 6 miles (9.7 km) north of the Interstate 79 junction. It proceeds southwest towards Tyler Heights and Cross Lanes, where it widens to three lanes. At the junction with Interstate 64, it proceeds southeast where it ends at WV 25 at Institute.
