= Pocatalico =

Pocatalico may refer to:

- Pocatalico River, a river in West Virginia
- Pocatalico, West Virginia, an unincorporated community
