= Timeline of Charleston, West Virginia =

The following is a timeline of the history of the city of Charleston, West Virginia, USA.

== Prior to 20th century ==
- 1794 – "Virginia General Assembly designated 40-acres of George Clendenin's land, as Charlestown."
- 1805 – "Salt-tub mill" begins operating.
- 1808 – Farmers' Repository newspaper begins publication.
- 1815 – Ruffner Mansion built.
- 1818
  - Charlestown renamed "Charleston".
  - Mercer Academy established.
- 1819 – Spectator newspaper begins publication.
- 1841 – Kanawha Lyceum active (approximate date).
- 1850 – Population: 1,050.
- 1862 – Battle of Charleston fought near town during the American Civil War.
- 1863 – June 20: Charleston becomes part of new U.S. state of West Virginia.
- 1870
  - City of Charleston incorporated.
  - Charleston designated West Virginia state capital.
- 1872 – Kanawha Chronicle newspaper begins publication.
- 1875 – State capital moves from Charleston to Wheeling.
- 1885
  - State Capital moves from Wheeling back to Charleston.
  - State Capitol building expanded.
- 1890
  - West Virginia Historical and Antiquarian Society headquartered in Charleston.
  - Population: 6,742.
- 1891
  - Burlew Opera House in business.
  - West Virginia Colored Institute founded near Charleston.
- 1892 – Capitol City Commercial College founded.
- 1897 – Sacred Heart Church built.
- 1900 – Chamber of Commerce organized.

== 20th century ==
- 1905 – State Bureau of Archives and History headquartered in Charleston.
- 1906 – Mason School of Music founded.
- 1909
  - Charleston Public Library opens.
  - Stalnaker Drugstore in business.
- 1910 – Population: 22,996.
- 1913 – Chemical manufactory begins operating.
- 1916 – Libbey-Owens-Ford glass manufactory and Charleston High School built.
- 1917 – Owens Bottle Company manufactory in business in Kanawha City.
- 1919 – Town of South Charleston incorporated near Charleston.
- 1920 – Charleston Daily Mail newspaper in publication.
- 1921 – Charleston City Hall built.
- 1922 – Kearse Theater in business.
- 1923 – Sacred Heart High School established.
- 1925 – West Virginia Governor's Mansion built.
- 1927
  - WCHS radio begins broadcasting.
  - Garnett Library (public library branch) opens.
  - Union Carbide manufacturer buys Blaine Island in South Charleston, near city of Charleston.
- 1929 – Charleston Municipal Airport established.
- 1930 – Population: 60,408.
- 1932 – State Capitol building rebuilt.
- 1934 – Kanawha County Public Library established.
- 1935 – Morris Harvey College relocates to Charleston.
- 1939
  - Charleston Municipal Auditorium built.
  - WGKV radio begins broadcasting.
  - State Theatre in business.
- 1940 – Stonewall Jackson High School built.
- 1941 – Kanawha Boulevard constructed (approximate date).
- 1947 – Kanawha Airport, now known as Yeager Airport, begins operating.
- 1954 – WCHS-TV (television) begins broadcasting.
- 1957 – WBOY-TV (television) begins broadcasting.
- 1959 – Charleston Civic Center, now known as the Charleston Coliseum & Convention Center, opens.
- 1960 – Population: 85,796.
- 1961
  - July 19: Kanawha River flood.
  - Sunrise Art Museum established.
- 1978 – Morris Harvey College renamed University of Charleston.
- 1983 – Charleston Town Center shopping mall in business.
- 1998 – City website online (approximate date).

== 21st century ==
- 2003 – Clay Center for the Arts and Sciences of West Virginia opens.
- 2005 – West Virginia Music Hall of Fame established
- 2010 – Population: 51,400.
- 2015 – Charleston Gazette-Mail newspaper is formed by the merger of the Charleston Gazette and Charleston Daily Mail.
- 2020 – Population: 48,864
- 2021 – Population: 48,018

== See also ==
- Charleston history
- National Register of Historic Places listings in Kanawha County, West Virginia
- West Virginia Legislature (seated in Charleston)
- List of Governors of West Virginia (seated in Charleston)
- Other cities in West Virginia:
  - Timeline of Huntington, West Virginia
  - Timeline of Wheeling, West Virginia

== Bibliography ==
- J. A. Gibbons (1872). Kanawha Valley: Its Resources and Developments; Also, Special Business Directory of Charleston and Other Cities. Charleston: Gibbens, Atkinson & Co., Printers.
- D.H. Strother (1872). Capital of West Virginia and the Great Kanawha Valley. Charleston: Journal Office.
- J.H. Chataigne, ed. (1882). "Charleston". Chesapeake & Ohio Railway Directory. Richmond, VA. pp. 349–356. OCLC 23244118.
- "Charleston". West Virginia State Gazetteer and Business Directory. Detroit: R.L. Polk & Co. 1882.
- History of Kanawha County, and Biographical Sketches of Prominent Men. Charleston: Miller & Graham. 1885.
- Charleston Chamber of Commerce (1901). Century Chronicle, Devoted to the Capital City. The Chamber.
- Chisholm, Hugh (1910), "Charleston", Encyclopaedia Britannica (11th ed.), New York, OCLC 14782424
- W. S. Laidley (1911), History of Charleston and Kanawha County, West Virginia, and Representative Citizens, Chicago: Richmond-Arnold Publishing Co., OCLC 3645365, OL 25173948M
- Thomas Condit Miller; Hu Maxwell (1913). "Kanawha County". West Virginia and Its People. New York: Lewis Historical Publishing Company.
- Code of Ordinances of the City of Charleston, West Virginia. Laws, etc. (Code of ordinances : 1921 ed.). Tribune Print. Co. 1921.
- Federal Writers' Project (1941). "Charleston". West Virginia: A Guide to the Mountain State. American Guide Series. New York: Oxford University Press. pp. 177+ – via Google Books. + chronology
- Jean Callahan (August 1978). "Cancer Valley". Mother Jones. San Francisco.
- George Thomas Kurian (1994), "Charleston, West Virginia", World Encyclopedia of Cities, vol. 1: North America, Santa Barbara, Calif.: ABC-CLIO, OL 1431653M – via Internet Archive (fulltext)
- Stan Bumgardner (2006). Charleston. Postcard History Series. Charleston, SC: Arcadia. ISBN 978-0-7385-4265-2.
- Paul T. Hellmann (2006). "West Virginia: Charleston". Historical Gazetteer of the United States. Taylor & Francis. ISBN 1-135-94859-3.
