= Tyler Mountain, West Virginia =

- Unincorporated community
- Location within West Virginia Location within the United States
- Coordinates: 38°23′33″N 81°43′15″W
- Country: United States
- State: West Virginia
- County: Kanawha
- Elevation: 646 ft (197 m)
- Time zone: UTC-5 (Eastern (EST))
  - Summer (DST): UTC-4 (EDT)
- Area codes: 304 & 681
- GNIS feature ID: 1548448

Tyler Mountain is an unincorporated community in Kanawha County, West Virginia, United States. Tyler Mountain is located at the junction of State routes 62 and 501, 5.5 miles (8.9 km) west-northwest of Charleston.
