= Benjamin L. Rosenbloom =

American politician (1880–1965)

Benjamin Rosenbloom
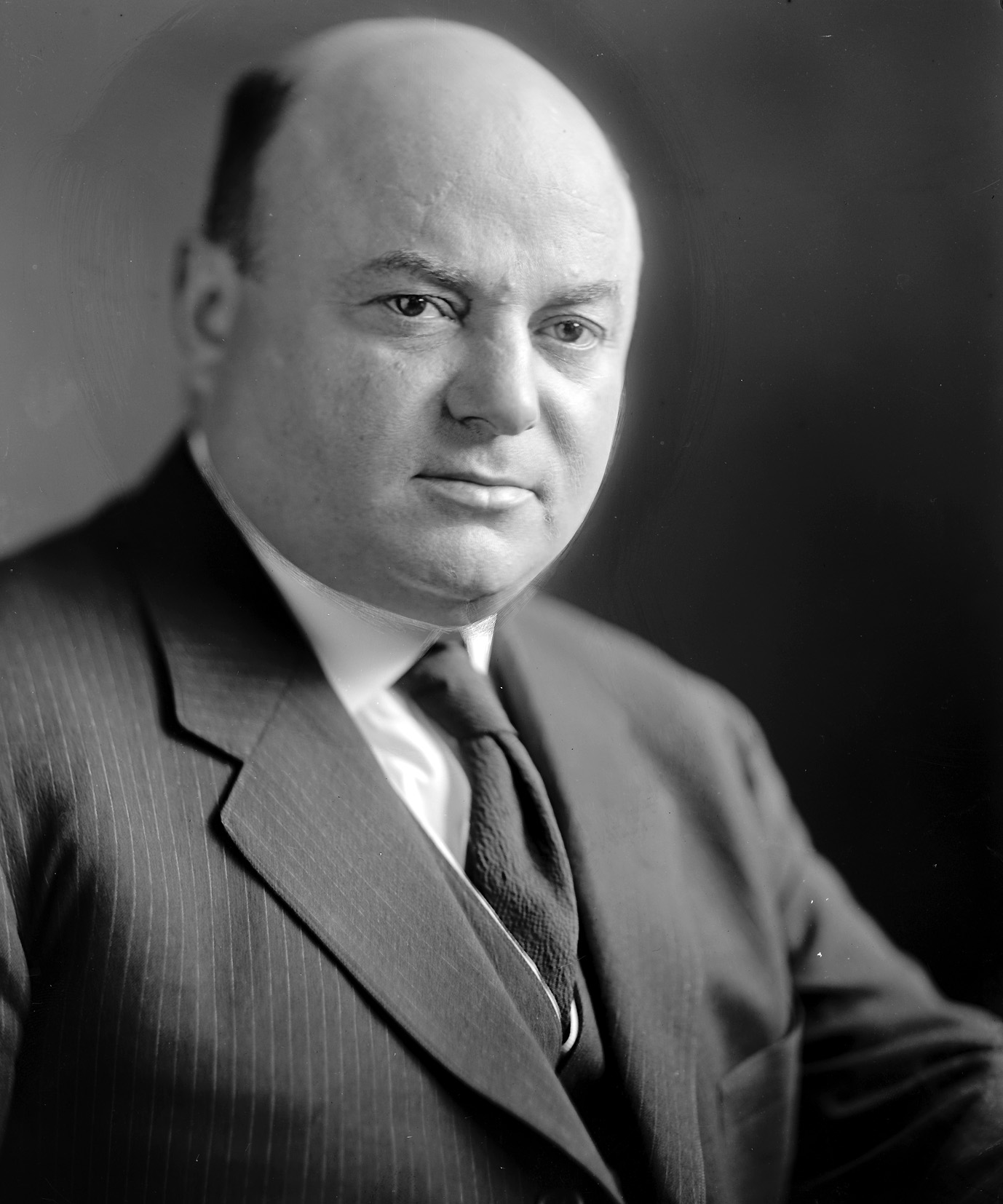

Member of the U.S. House of Representatives from West Virginia's 1st district
- In office March 4, 1921 – March 3, 1925
- Preceded by: Matthew M. Neely
- Succeeded by: Carl G. Bachmann

Personal details
- Born: June 3, 1880 Braddock, Pennsylvania, U.S.
- Died: March 22, 1965 (aged 84) Cleveland, Ohio, U.S
- Party: Republican

Benjamin Louis Rosenbloom (June 3, 1880 – March 22, 1965) was an American lawyer and politician who served two terms as a Republican member of the United States House of Representatives from West Virginia from 1921 to 1925.

== Biography ==
Born in Braddock, Pennsylvania to Russian-Jewish immigrants, Rosenbloom attended the public schools and graduated from the North Braddock High School. He attended West Virginia University at Morgantown, studied law, was admitted to the bar in 1904 and commenced practice in Wheeling, Ohio County, West Virginia in 1905.

=== Political career ===
He was elected and served as a West Virginia State Senate member from 1914 to 1918.

Rosenbloom was elected from West Virginia's 1st District as a Republican to the Sixty-seventh and Sixty-eighth Congresses (March 4, 1921 – March 3, 1925) as the first Jewish member of Congress from West Virginia. He was not a candidate for renomination in 1924, having become a candidate for the United States Senate. He was an unsuccessful candidate for the Republican nomination for United States Senator in 1924.

=== Later career ===
He resumed the practice of his profession in Wheeling, published a weekly newspaper from 1933 to 1935, was a councilman and vice mayor of Wheeling, West Virginia, from 1935 to 1939, and retired from law practice in 1951.

=== Death ===
He died in Cleveland, Ohio on March 22, 1965.

== See also ==
- List of Jewish members of the United States Congress
- List of United States representatives from West Virginia

U.S. House of Representatives
Preceded by Matthew M. Neely	Member of the U.S. House of Representatives from West Virginia's 1st congressional district 1921–1925	Succeeded by Carl G. Bachmann
