= Blackburn B. Dovener =

American lawyer and politician (1842–1914)

Blackburn Barrett Dovener
- Blackburn B. Dovener
- Born: April 20, 1842; Tays Valley, Virginia (now West Virginia), US
- Died: May 9, 1914 (aged 72); Glen Echo, Maryland, US
- Burial place: Arlington National Cemetery
- Military career
- Allegiance: United States
- Branch: United States Army
- Rank: Captain
- Units: Company A, 15th West Virginia Volunteer Infantry Regiment.

Blackburn Barrett Dovener (April 20, 1842 – May 9, 1914) was a Republican politician from West Virginia who served as a United States representative. He served as a member of the 54th, 55th, 56th, 57th, 58th and 59th United States Congresses. He died in 1914.

== Biography ==
Dovener was born in Tays Valley, Virginia, in Cabell County (now in Putnam County, West Virginia) on April 20, 1842. He taught school from 1858 to 1861. When he was nineteen, he raised a company and served as captain of Company A, 15th West Virginia Volunteer Infantry Regiment. He became captain of an Ohio River steamboat in 1867. After studying law, he was admitted to the bar in 1873 and entered practice in Wheeling, West Virginia. He gained some fame there as counsel to murder defendant Taylor Strauder, taking the case (Strauder v. West Virginia) all the way to the Supreme Court of the United States, winning an important legal victory for the civil rights of freedmen.

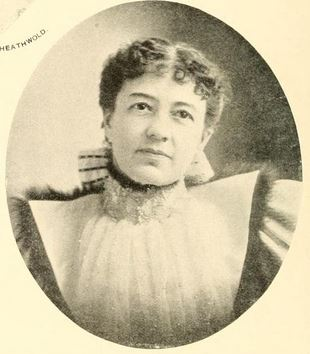
Margaret Lynch

He married Margaret Lynch, a native of Pittsburgh, Pennsylvania. When she was young, her parents moved to Wheeling, Virginia, now West Virginia, and she grew up there. Her father was a Union man when it cost something in Virginia to be a Union man, as was her husband. At the commencement of the Civil War, when only nineteen years old age, Dovener raised a company of loyal Virginians and served in the Union Army during the entire war. It was when he came to Wheeling to be mustered in that he first met Miss Lynch, who was seventeen. They corresponded until the close of the war when they were married. Their younger son, Robert, died in his twenty-second year. Their elder son, William, was a lawyer, like his father.

He served as a member of the West Virginia House of Delegates in 1883 and 1884. His candidacy for election to the Fifty-second Congress was unsuccessful. In 1894, he won election as a Republican to the Fifty-fourth and to the five succeeding Congresses (March 4, 1895 - March 3, 1907). His candidacy for renomination was unsuccessful, and he returned to his legal practice in Wheeling. He retired to Glen Echo, Maryland, until his death on May 9, 1914. He was buried in Arlington National Cemetery.

== See also ==
- West Virginia's congressional delegations

U.S. House of Representatives
Preceded by John O. Pendleton	Member of the U.S. House of Representatives from West Virginia's 1st congressional district 1895-1907	Succeeded by William P. Hubbard
