= West Virginia Route 622 =

State highway in West Virginia, United States

West Virginia Route 622

Route information
- Maintained by WVDOH
- Length: 17.45 mi (28.08 km)

Major junctions
- South end: WV 25 near Institute
- I-64 in Cross Lanes
- North end: I-77 near Pocatalico

Location
- Country: United States
- State: West Virginia
- Counties: Kanawha

Highway system
- West Virginia State Highway System; Interstate; US; State
← WV 618	→ WV 635

West Virginia Route 622 is a north–south state highway located entirely in Kanawha County, West Virginia. The southern terminus of the route is at West Virginia Route 25 west of Institute. The northern terminus is at Interstate 77 exit 114 north of Pocatalico.

== Route description ==
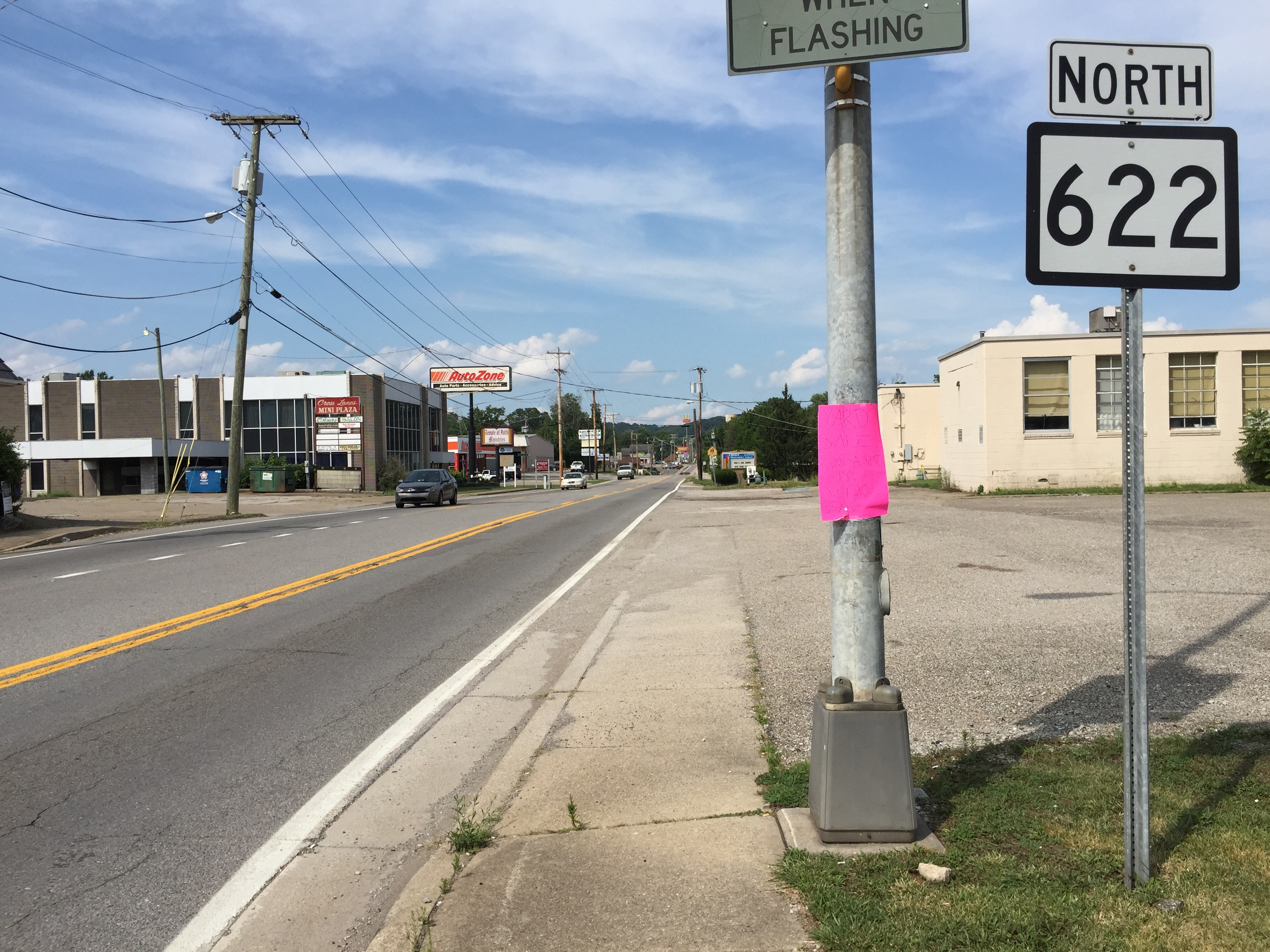
View north along WV 622 at WV 62 in Cross Lanes

WV 622 begins at WV 25 on the outskirts of Institute. From its southern terminus, WV 622 proceeds northwest to Interstate 64, where WV 622 interchanges with the expressway by way of exit 47 on the southern edge of Cross Lanes. As the route turns 90 degrees to the northeast, WV 622 gains an extra turning lane, widening the road to three lanes as it enters Cross Lanes. The third lane terminates shortly after the intersection of Doc Bailey Road (Kanawha County Route 10.)

Outside of Cross Lanes, WV 622 proceeds eastward through Tyler Heights before resuming a northerly alignment at the northern terminus of West Virginia Route 501 east of town. Roughly five miles to the northeast of WV 501, WV 622 intersects County Route 21, the former alignment of U.S. Route 21 through West Virginia. WV 622 turns north onto CR 21, running concurrent with the road for three miles (5 km) to I-77, where WV 622 comes to an end north of Pocatalico and six miles (10 km) north of the I-77/Interstate 79 junction. CR 21, however, continues northward from the interchange.

== Major intersections ==
The entire route is in Kanawha County.

Location	mi	km	Destinations	Notes
	0.00	0.00	WV 25 – Institute, Nitro	Southern terminus of WV 622
Cross Lanes			I-64 – Huntington, Charleston	I-64 exit 47
Cross Lanes			WV 62 – Poca, Charleston	
Tyler Heights	5.76	9.27	WV 501 south	Northern terminus of WV 501
	17.45	28.08	I-77 – Sissonville, Parkersburg, Charleston	I-77 exit 114
1.000 mi = 1.609 km; 1.000 km = 0.621 mi: Concurrency terminus
