= Howard Railey =

American politician

Member of the West Virginia House of Delegates
- In office 1904

Personal details
- Born: Howard H. Railey
- Died: December 19, 1936 Institute, West Virginia, U.S.
- Party: Republican
- Occupation: Politician

Howard H. Railey (died December 19, 1936) was an American politician from West Virginia. A Republican, he represented Fayette County, West Virginia in 1904 in the West Virginia House of Representatives. He served as superintendent of the West Virginia Colored Orphans Home. He died at his home in Institute, West Virginia.

He received a diploma in 1900.

== See also ==
- List of African-American officeholders (1900–1959)
