= William Pallister Hubbard =

American politician

William Hubbard
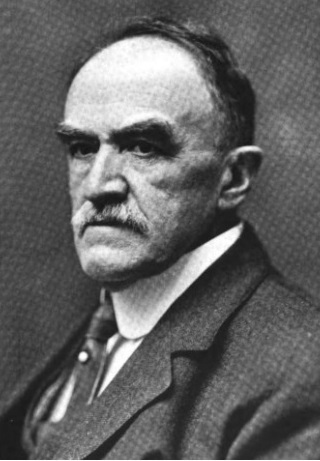

Member of the U.S. House of Representatives from West Virginia's 1st district
- In office March 4, 1907 – March 3, 1911
- Preceded by: Blackburn B. Dovener
- Succeeded by: John W. Davis

Personal details
- Born: December 24, 1843 Wheeling, Virginia, U.S.
- Died: December 5, 1921 (aged 77) Wheeling, West Virginia, U.S
- Party: Republican

Military service
- Branch/service: Union Army
- Rank: First lieutenant
- Battles/wars: American Civil War

William Pallister Hubbard (December 24, 1843 – December 5, 1921) was an American Republican politician from Wheeling, West Virginia who served as a United States representative. The son of Congressman Chester D. Hubbard, he served as a member of the 60th and 61st United States Congresses.

Hubbard attended the public schools and Linsly School in Wheeling. He graduated from Wesleyan University, Middletown, Connecticut in 1863. After studying law, he was admitted to the bar in 1864. He enlisted in the Union Army as a private in 1865 in the 3rd West Virginia Cavalry. He rose to the rank of first lieutenant before being honorably discharged.

After earning a Masters of Arts degree in 1866, again at Wesleyan, he returned to Wheeling and commenced the practice of law in 1866. He married Ann E. Chamberlin of Louisiana in 1868.

He was a clerk of the West Virginia House of Delegates from 1866 to 1870, then served as a member of the House of Delegates in 1881 and 1882. He was chosen as a delegate to the Republican National Convention in 1888 and 1912. At the 1912 Republican convention, Hubbard was a leading supporter of Theodore Roosevelt in his unsuccessful attempt to retake the White House. He was also an unsuccessful Republican candidate for Attorney General of West Virginia in 1888.

Hubbard's candidacy for election in 1890 to the Fifty-second Congress was also unsuccessful. From 1901 to 1903 he served as chairman of the commission to revise the tax laws of West Virginia. He was elected in 1906 from West Virginia's 1st District as a Republican to the Sixtieth and Sixty-first Congresses (March 4, 1907 – March 3, 1911).

He declined renomination in 1910 and returned to his law practice in Wheeling. There he died at the age of 77, and was buried in Greenwood Cemetery in Wheeling.

== See also ==
- West Virginia's congressional delegations

U.S. House of Representatives
Preceded by Blackburn B. Dovener	Member of the U.S. House of Representatives from West Virginia's 1st congressional district 1907-1911	Succeeded by John W. Davis
