= Carl G. Bachmann =

American politician

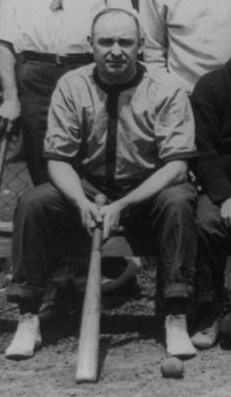
- Bachmann during the United States Congressional Baseball Game

Member of the U.S. House of Representatives from West Virginia's 1st district
- In office March 4, 1925 – March 3, 1933
- Preceded by: Benjamin L. Rosenbloom
- Succeeded by: Robert L. Ramsay

Personal details
- Born: May 14, 1890 Wheeling, West Virginia, U.S.
- Died: January 22, 1980 (aged 89) Wheeling, West Virginia, U.S.
- Party: Republican
- Profession: Politician

Carl G. Bachmann (May 14, 1890 – January 22, 1980) was an American lawyer and politician who served four terms as a United States Congressman from Wheeling, West Virginia from 1925 to 1933.

== Biography ==
Bachmann was born in Wheeling as the son of Charles F. and Sophia Bachmann; three of his grandparents were German immigrants. In 1908 he graduated from Linsly Institute. He went to college first at Washington and Jefferson College for two years, and later graduated from West Virginia University, where he was a member of Phi Sigma Kappa fraternity. He later graduated from law school at West Virginia University in 1915.

=== Family ===
On July 14, 1914, he married Susan Louise Smith. They had three children: Charles F., Gilbert S. and Susan Jane.

=== Early career ===
In 1915, Bachmann began to practice law in Wheeling, and in 1917 he was appointed assistant prosecuting attorney for Ohio County. In 1920 he was elected prosecuting attorney, serving from January 1921 to December 1924.

=== Congress ===
In November 1924 he was elected to the United States House of Representatives as a Republican, to serve in the First Congressional District of West Virginia. From 1931 to 1933 Bachmann was the Minority Whip.

He served as a Congressman until he was defeated in 1932.

=== Later career ===
He was later elected mayor of Wheeling in 1947 and served until 1951.

=== Death and burial ===
He died in Wheeling and is buried in Greenwood Cemetery.

== See also ==
- List of mayors of Wheeling, West Virginia

U.S. House of Representatives
Preceded by Benjamin L. Rosenbloom	Member of the U.S. House of Representatives from West Virginia's 1st congressional district 1925–1933	Succeeded by Robert L. Ramsay
Party political offices
Preceded by John McDuffie	House Minority Whip; 1931–1933	Succeeded by Harry L. Englebright
Preceded by Albert H. Vestal	House Republican Whip; 1931–1933	Succeeded by Harry L. Englebright
