= Elm Grove, West Virginia =

Unincorporated community in West Virginia, United States

Elm Grove
- Urban neighborhood
- Location within the state of West Virginia Elm Grove (the United States)
- Coordinates: 40°02′44″N 80°39′05″W
- Country: United States
- State: West Virginia
- County: Ohio
- Time zone: UTC-5 (Eastern (EST))
  - Summer (DST): UTC-4 (EDT)

Elm Grove (also Elmgrove) is a neighborhood of Wheeling, Ohio County, West Virginia, United States. It lies at an elevation of 774 feet (236 m).

The Elm Grove Stone Arch Bridge, the oldest surviving bridge in the U.S. state of West Virginia, is located in Elm Grove.

Elm Grove is home to the Shepherd Hall (Monument Place), a historic house.
