= John O. Pendleton =

American politician (1851–1916)

John Overton Pendleton
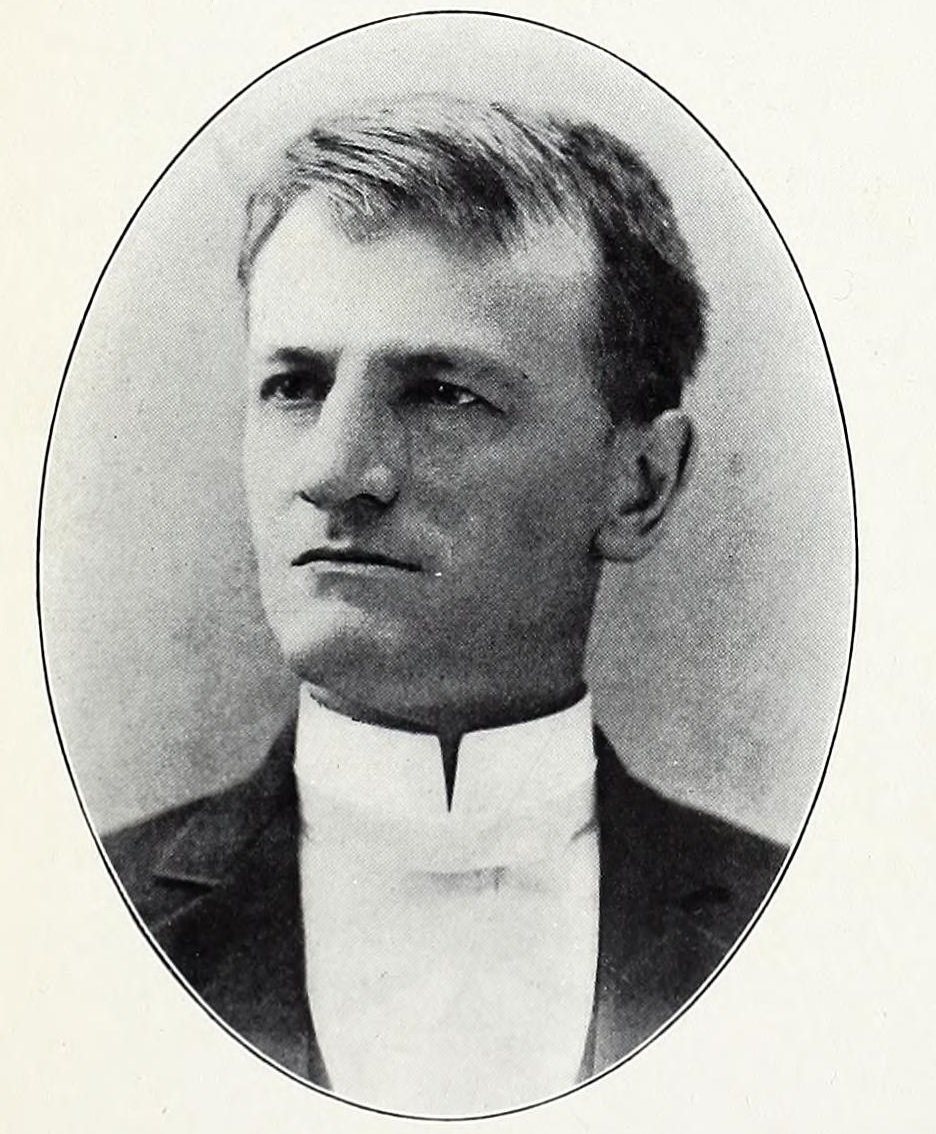
- John O. Pendleton (West Virginia Congressman)

Member of the U.S. House of Representatives from West Virginia's 1st district
- In office March 4, 1889 – February 26, 1890
- Preceded by: Nathan Goff
- Succeeded by: George W. Atkinson
- In office March 4, 1891 – March 3, 1895
- Preceded by: George W. Atkinson
- Succeeded by: Blackburn B. Dovener

Personal details
- Born: July 4, 1851 Wellsburg, West Virginia, U.S.
- Died: December 24, 1916 (aged 65) Wheeling, West Virginia, U.S.
- Resting place: Greenwood Cemetery
- Party: Democratic

John Overton Pendleton (July 4, 1851 – December 24, 1916) was a U.S. representative from West Virginia.

== Biography ==
Pendleton was born in Wellsburg, West Virginia (then part of Virginia), the son of Confederate veteran Joseph H. Pendleton and Margaret (Ewing) Pendleton. His family moved to Wheeling, West Virginia (then part of Virginia) in 1851. He attended Aspen Hill Academy in Louisa County, Virginia from 1865 to 1869. From 1869 to 1871 he was a student at Bethany College. He studied law, was admitted to the bar in 1874 and commenced practice in Wheeling.

Pendleton was active in politics as a Democrat. In 1886, he was an unsuccessful candidate for the West Virginia.

In March 1889, he presented credentials as a Member-elect to the 51st United States Congress Congress and took his seat. He served from March 4, 1889, to February 26, 1890, when he was succeeded by George W. Atkinson, who successfully contested the election. Atkinson served out the remainder of the term, until March 3, 1891.

In 1890, Pendleton was elected to the 52nd Congress. He was reelected to the 53rd Congress in 1892, and he served from March 4, 1891, to March 3, 1895. In the 53rd Congress, Pendleton was chairman of the Committee on Private Land Claims.

== Later life ==
Pendleton was an unsuccessful candidate for re-nomination in 1894. After leaving Congress he resumed the practice of law in Wheeling. He died in Wheeling on December 24, 1916, and was interred at Greenwood Cemetery in Wheeling.

U.S. House of Representatives
| Preceded by Nathan Goff | Member of the U.S. House of Representatives from West Virginia's 1st congressional district 1889-1890 | Succeeded by George W. Atkinson |
| Preceded by George W. Atkinson | Member of the U.S. House of Representatives from West Virginia's 1st congressional district 1891-1895 | Succeeded by Blackburn B. Dovener |
