= Chester D. Hubbard =

American politician (1814–1891)

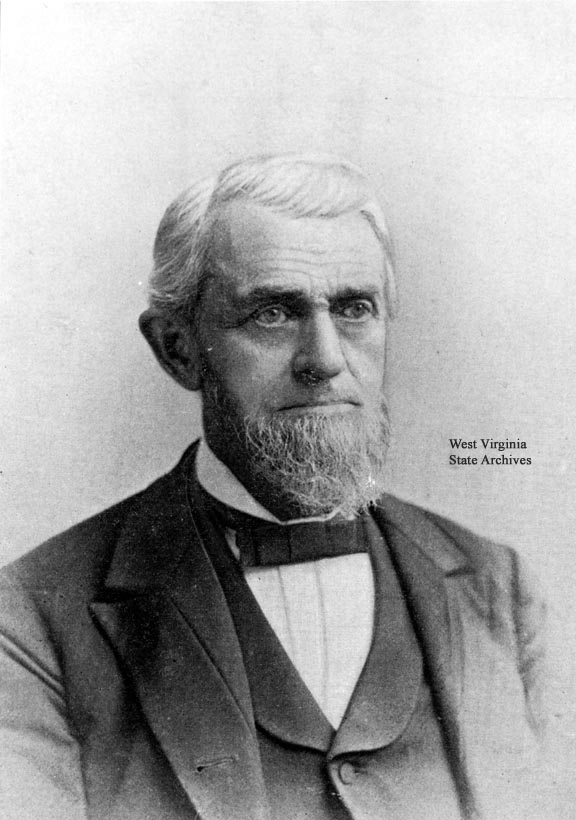

Member of the U.S. House of Representatives from West Virginia's 1st district
- In office March 4, 1865 – March 3, 1869
- Preceded by: Jacob B. Blair
- Succeeded by: Isaac H. Duval

Member of the Virginia House of Delegates from the Ohio County district
- In office January 12, 1852 – December 2, 1853 Serving with Charles W. Russell, John M. Oldham
- Succeeded by: John C. Campbell

Personal details
- Born: November 25, 1814 Hamden, Connecticut), U.S.
- Died: August 23, 1891 (aged 76) Wheeling, West Virginia, U.S.
- Party: Union; Republican
- Spouse: Sarah Pallister
- Children: William Pallister Hubbard, Dana List Hubbard, Chester Russell Hubbard, Julia Alice Hubbard Tyler, Anna Hubbard Brady (1852–1933)
- Profession: banker, manufacturer, politician

Chester Dorman Hubbard (November 25, 1814 – August 23, 1891) was a two-term U.S. representative from West Virginia, who previously served in the Virginia General Assembly and Virginia Secession Convention of 1861 before the American Civil War and who helped found the state of West Virginia.

== Early and family life ==
Born in Hamden, New Haven County, Connecticut (with ancestors who had emigrated from England in the 17th century), as an infant Chester Hubbard moved with his father Dana Hubbard and mother Aseneth to Pittsburgh, Pennsylvania in 1815. The growing family moved again four years later, to Wheeling (in what became West Virginia with this Hubbard's help during the American Civil War), where Dana Hubbard established the first lumber and grist mills in the new settlement on the National Road. The family also had three more sons who survived childhood, and a daughter, although Chester outlived all his siblings. Sent back east for higher education, Chester Hubbard graduated first in his class from the Wesleyan University in Middletown, Connecticut in 1840. While at Wesleyan, Hubbard helped found the Eclectic Society, in 1838, making it one of older fraternal college organizations in the United States. (An ancestor, Rev. William Hubbard, had officiated as president of Harvard College at its 1688 commencement exercises).

On September 20, 1842, Chester Hubbard married English-born Sarah Pallister, step-daughter of the late John List. They had five children: William Pallister Hubbard (who became a lawyer and congressman like his father), Dana List Hubbard (1845 - 1893), Chester Russell Hubbard (1848 - 1934), Julia Alice Hubbard Tyler (1850 - 1908) of Triadelphia, and Anna Hubbard Brady (1852 - 1933, wife of Joseph C. Brady.

An active member of Wheeling's Chapline Street Methodist Church, in 1872 Hubbard served as a delegate to the General Convention, held that year in Brooklyn, New York.

== Career ==
Returning to Ohio County after graduating from college, he worked in his father's lumber business until his father died in 1852. Chester Hubbard, D. C. List and others then established the Bank of Wheeling, with Hubbard as its President until 1865, when it was reorganized as the German Bank, and he continued as President at the time of his death. In 1859 Hubbard organized C. D. Hubbard & Co., which leased the Crescent Iron Mill, which manufactured railroad iron for over a year. He also helped organize the Wheeling Hinge Company, of which he served as a director until his death. In 1871 he became secretary of the reorganized Wheeling Iron and Nail Company. He was also a member of Logan & Co. for twenty years and president of the Logan Drug Company at the time of his death.

After the adoption of the Virginia Constitution of 1850 led to increased representation of western Virginia in the Virginia General Assembly, Ohio County, which had previously been represented in the Virginia House of Delegates by Charles W. Russell, received two additional seats. Hubbard was elected to fill one of them in 1851, but neither he, John M. Oldham nor Russell was re-elected in 1853. Instead, Ohio County lost one seat, and John C. Campbell and Thomas M. Gally were elected to the remaining seats. Ohio County voters elected Hubbard one of their three delegates to the Virginia convention in Richmond, Virginia in 1861 and opposed secession. He then was elected one of Ohio County's six delegates at the Wheeling Convention of 1861 served as delegate to the West Virginia constitutional convention in Wheeling the same year.

Hubbard then served in the West Virginia senate in 1863 and 1864, and his eldest son William Pallister Hubbard, who had become a lawyer, served as an officer of the 3rd West Virginia Cavalry. Hubbard was an active Republican and partisan of James G. Blaine and served as delegate to the Republican National Convention in 1864 and 1880.

Hubbard was elected as a Unionist to the 39th United States Congress and reelected as a Republican to the 40th United States Congress (March 4, 1865 – March 3, 1869). He served as chairman of the Committee on Expenditures in the Department of the Interior (Fortieth Congress), but was defeated in the primary in 1868, and so resumed his banking and manufacturing pursuits. He was among the promoters and builders of the Pittsburg, Wheeling & Kentucky Railroad in 1873, becoming president of the road in 1874.

An earnest friend of education, Hubbard was a trustee of the Linsly Institute (which his son attended) in 1848, and became its treasurer in 1873. He also helped found the Wheeling Female College, and served as a trustee, and as President of the Board from 1865 up to the sale of the property.

== Death and legacy ==
Hubbard died in Wheeling on August 23, 1891. The Wheeling Intelligencer published a favorable obituary. He was interred in Greenwood Cemetery. His son William Pallister Hubbard also served in the U.S. Congress as a Republican beginning in 1907. His letters are preserved, and important to the study of Congressional Reconstruction and Republican Party politics.

== See also ==
- West Virginia's congressional delegations

== Sources ==
- United States Congress. "Chester D. Hubbard (id: H000879)". Biographical Directory of the United States Congress.

U.S. House of Representatives
Preceded by Jacob B. Blair	Member of the U.S. House of Representatives from West Virginia's 1st congressional district 1865-1869	Succeeded by Isaac H. Duval
