= West Virginia Route 501 =

State highway in West Virginia, United States

West Virginia Route 501

Route information
- Maintained by WVDOH

Major junctions
- South end: WV 62 at Tyler Mountain
- North end: WV 622 at Tyler Heights

Location
- Country: United States
- State: West Virginia
- Counties: Kanawha

Highway system
- West Virginia State Highway System; Interstate; US; State
| ← WV 480 | → US 522 |

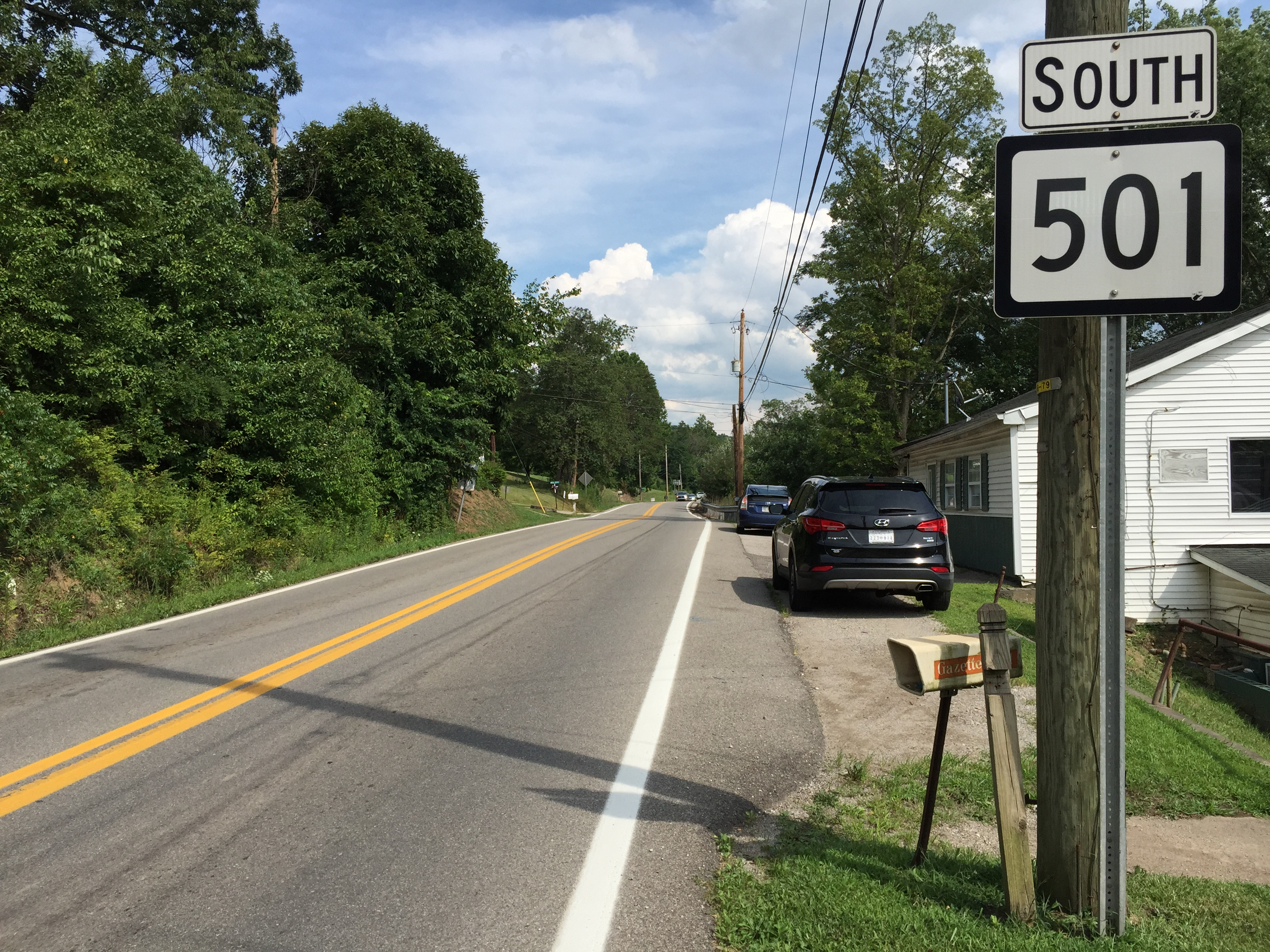
View south along WV 501 at WV 622 in Tyler Heights

West Virginia Route 501 is a two-lane west–east connector route. It is known as Big Tyler Road, and starts at the unincorporated community of Tyler Mountain, splitting off from WV Route 62. From there it crosses over Tyler Mountain, and ends at the community of Tyler Heights, where WV Route 622 comes out and meets it. The rest of the community past that is on Route 622.

WV 501 was formerly County Route 5, which included the part of WV 622 extending back to WV 62 at Cross Lanes.

== Major intersections ==
The entire route is in Kanawha County.

| Location | mi | km | Destinations | Notes |
|---|---|---|---|---|
| Tyler Mountain | | | WV 62 – Charleston, Cross Lanes | |
| Tyler Heights | | | WV 622 | |
1.000 mi = 1.609 km; 1.000 km = 0.621 mi
