= West Virginia Colored Children's Home =

- U.S. National Register of Historic Places
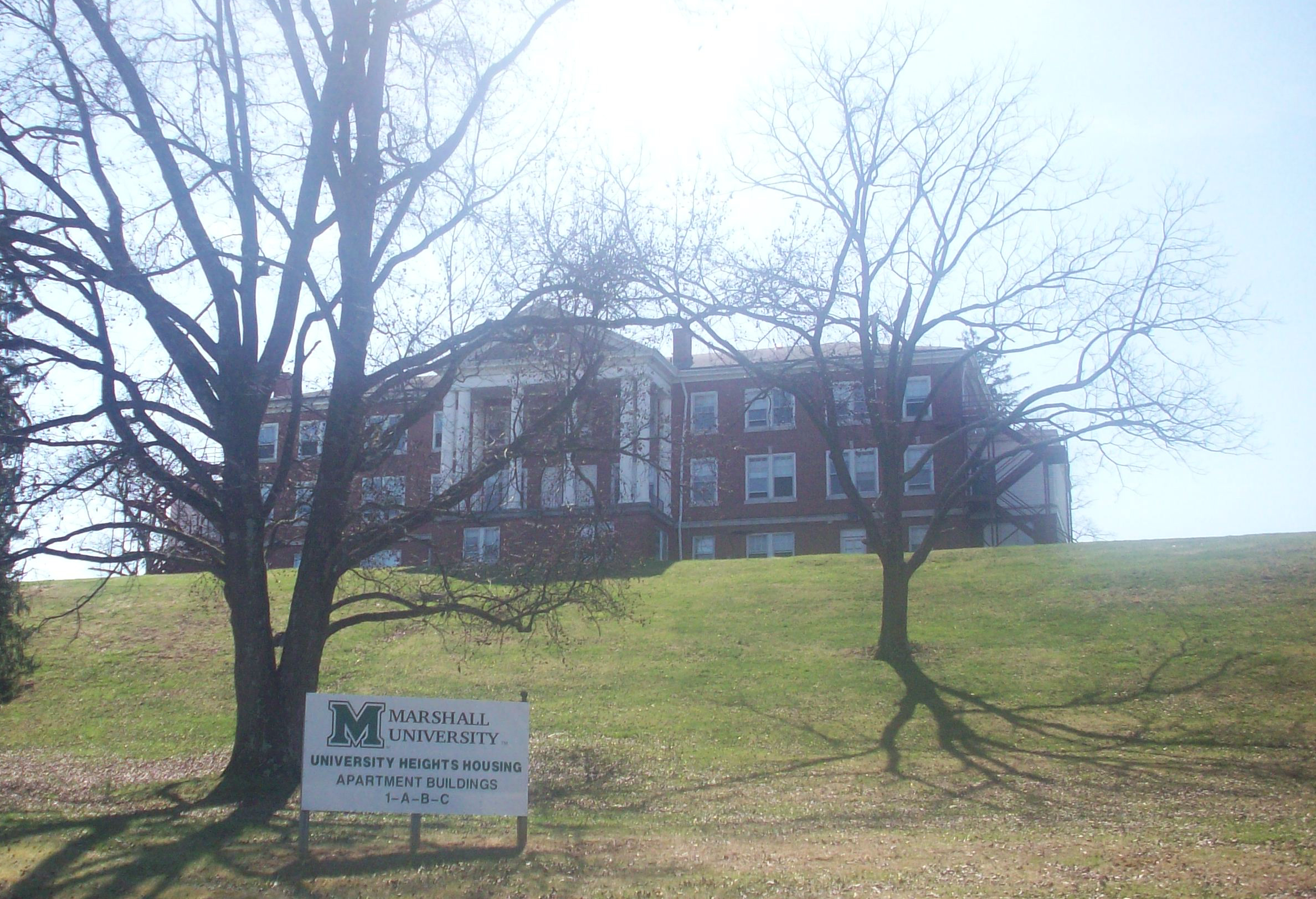
- West Virginia Colored Children's Home, March 2009

- Location within West Virginia Location within the United States
- Location: 3353 US 60, near Huntington, West Virginia
- Coordinates: 38°24′34″N 82°22′25″W
- Area: 1 acre (0.40 ha)
- Built: 1923
- Architect: Warne, Tucker & Patteson
- Architectural style: Classical Revival
- Demolished: 2011
- NRHP reference No.: 97001413
- Added to NRHP: November 13, 1997

The West Virginia Colored Children's Home was a historic school, orphanage, and sanatorium building located near Huntington, Cabell County, West Virginia. It was the state's first social institution exclusively serving the needs of African American residents. The main structure, built in 1922–1923, was a three-story red brick building in the Classical Revival style. That building, located at 3353 U.S. Route 60, Huntington, West Virginia, was the last of a series of buildings that were constructed on the site. It was also known as the West Virginia Colored Orphans Home, Colored Orphan Home and Industrial School, the West Virginia Home for Aged and Infirm Colored Men and Women, and University Heights Apartments. It was listed on the National Register of Historic Places in 1997 but was demolished in 2011.

== History ==
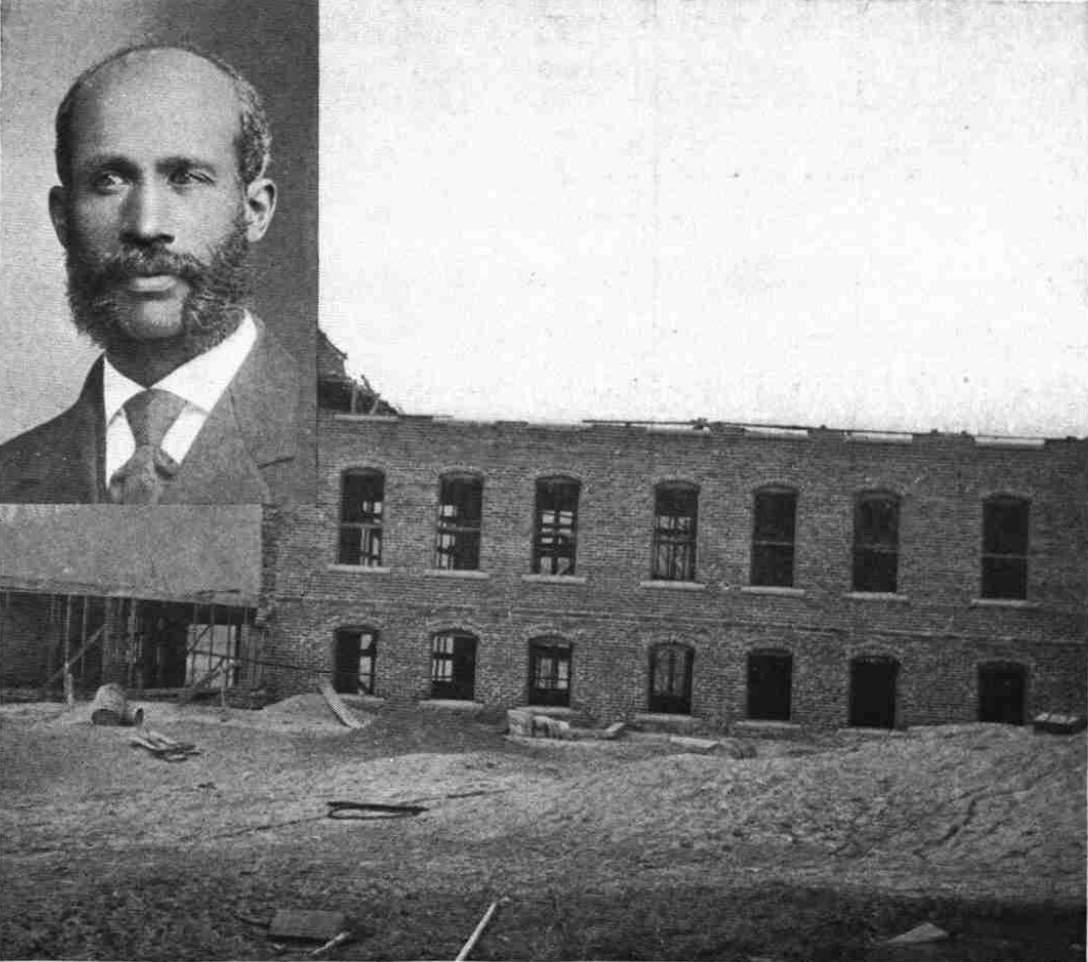
Colored Orphan Home and Industrial School and Rev. Charles E. McGhee (c. 1910)

The original institution was founded in 1899 by the Rev. Charles E. McGhee as the West Virginia Normal and Industrial School for Colored Children in Bluefield, West Virginia. McGhee moved the institution to Huntington, West Virginia in March 1900, but was forced to move to Blue Sulphur Springs (near Ona, West Virginia) due to lack of funds. However, the school reportedly faced local hostility there. The school moved back to Huntington in 1903 following the purchase of 210 acres by Reverend McGhee on the city outskirts overlooking the Guyandotte River. The state began to subsidize teacher salaries in 1903. The original three-story building, which had been built in 1904 in part by the children's labor, experienced a fire on November 5, 1909. A building within the complex under construction at the time of the fire escaped damage. It is not clear whether the original building had to be entirely rebuilt or was simply remodeled.

In 1911, the private institution, which functioned as an orphanage and school, came under state control. It was then renamed the West Virginia Colored Orphans Home. The school building burned down on April 5, 1920 and a new building was constructed between 1922 and 1923. A separate institution, the State Industrial Home for Colored Girls, was established in a building constructed on the property between 1924 and 1926, also of three stories. In 1931, the original institution's name was changed to the West Virginia Colored Children's Home. By 1951, residents of the Children's Home were no longer educated on site, but were bused to segregated public schools.

The West Virginia Colored Children's Home was closed in 1956 and the building was used as a nursing home, the West Virginia Home for Aged and Infirm Colored Men and Women. The property transferred to Marshall University in 1961 and later it was converted to apartments.

The property was purchased by a mental health and addiction treatment group in 2008 and transferred to Cabell County Board of Education in 2009. The building was demolished beginning on May 5, 2011, over the objections of preservationists, in preparation for the construction of Huntington East Middle School.

Reverend McGhee served as superintendent until 1915. Under his supervision, the average number of residents reached its height between 1912 and 1913 of 74 children. Howard H. Railey later served as a superintendent. He was also the third African American to serve in West Virginia’s legislature.

The building faced north. The east half of the building housed the boys, and the west half the girls. Originally the building had extensive two-story porticos that were later enclosed leaving only a central bay.

The property included a farm worked by the residents and, at times, an employed farmer and assistant farmer who lived in a cottage outbuilding. The property was improved by the Civil Works Administration during the Great Depression.

== See also ==
- National Register of Historic Places listings in Cabell County, West Virginia
