= Andy McKenzie (politician) =

American politician

Member of the West Virginia Senate from the 1st district
- In office 1996–2008

Mayor of Wheeling, West Virginia
- In office 2008–2016
- Preceded by: Nicholas A. Sparachane
- Succeeded by: Glenn Elliott

Personal details
- Born: August 16, 1970 (age 56)
- Education: West Liberty University; West Virginia University

Andy McKenzie (born August 16, 1970) is an American politician, former mayor of Wheeling, West Virginia. He previously served in the West Virginia State Senate from 1996 to 2008 for the 1st district as a Republican.

== Education ==
After graduating from West Liberty University, McKenzie went to West Virginia University for an MBA.

== See also ==
- List of mayors of Wheeling, West Virginia
