= Rotary Park Bridge =

- U.S. National Register of Historic Places
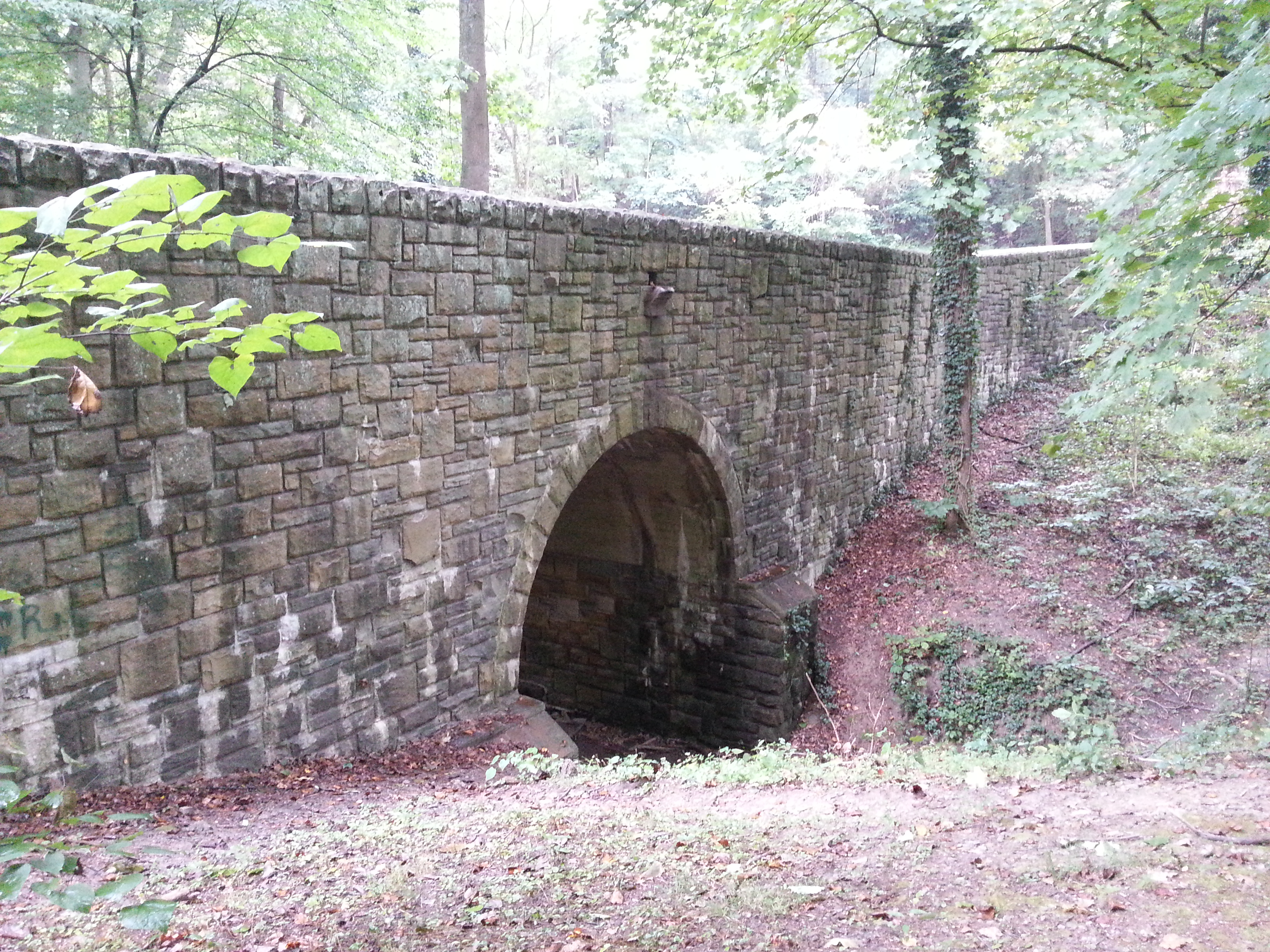
- Rotary Park Bridge, September 2013

- Location within West Virginia Location within the United States
- Location: Rotary Park, 31 St. and Rotary Dr., Huntington, West Virginia
- Coordinates: 38°25′7″N 82°23′39″W
- Area: less than one acre
- Built: 1929
- Architectural style: Rustic
- NRHP reference No.: 02001525
- Added to NRHP: December 12, 2002

Rotary Park Bridge is a historic arch bridge located in Rotary Park at Huntington, Cabell County, West Virginia, United States. Constructed between 1929 and 1930, the bridge is made of native rock-faced, square-cut ashlar in a rustic style. It measures approximately 175 feet long and 30 feet wide.

It was listed on the National Register of Historic Places in 2002.

== See also ==
- National Register of Historic Places listings in Cabell County, West Virginia
