= List of mayors of Wheeling, West Virginia =

This is a list of mayors of Wheeling, West Virginia, United States of America.

== Mayors ==
Name	Term start	Term end
George Miller	1806	1807
Moses Chapline	1807	1809
William Irwin	1809	1810
Noah Linsly	1810	1814
William Irwin	March 1814	September 1814
George Knox	1815	1816
William Irwin	1816	1817
Peter Yarnall	1817	1819
Moses Chapline	1819	1824
Z. Jacobs	1824	1828
Samuel Sprigg	March 1828	September 1828
John McLure	September 1828	March 1830
Moses W. Chapline	1830	1834
Z. Jacobs	1834	1836
Moses W. Chapline	May 1836	January 1840
George Dulty	January 1840	January 1846
Moses C. Good	January 1846	January 1847
William W. Shriver	January 1847	June 1848
Sobieski Brady	June 1848	January 1850
Alfred Caldwell	January 1850	January 1852
Morgan Nelson	January 1852	January 1853
Sobieski Brady	January 1853	January 1855
]James Paull	January 1855	January 1856
Alfred Caldwell	January 1856	January 1858
James Tanner	January 1858	January 1859
Andrew Wilson	January 1859	January 1861
Andrew J. Sweeney	January 1861	January 1863
George Baird	January 1863	January 1864
Henry Crangle	January 1864	January 1865
Andrew J. Sweeney	January 1865	January 1868
Sobieski Brady	January 1868	January 1869
Samuel McClellan Jr.	January 1869	January 1871
George W. Jeffers	January 1871	January 1875
Andrew J. Sweeney	January 1875	January 1881
Alfred Egerter	January 1881	January 1883
Jeremiah A. Miller	January 1883	January 1885
Jacob W. Grubb	January 1885	January 1887
Charles W. Seabright	January 1887	January 1893
Benjamin F. Caldwell	January 1893	January 1897
John R. Butts	January 1897	January 1899
Andrew T. Sweeney	January 1899	1905
Charles C. Schmidt	1905	August 1912 (died in office)
William O. Alexander (acting mayor)	August 1912	1912
Harvey L. Kirk	October 1912	1917
Clifford M. Vester	1917	1918
Thomas F. Thoner	1919	1925
William J. Steen	1925	1928
Thomas Y. Beckett	1929	1932
Gordon P. Fought	1932	1934
Charles F. Schultze	May 1935 (died in office)	1938
John J. Mathison	May 1938	1943
Russell S. Goodwin	1943	1947
Carl G. Bachmann	1947	1951
Charles J. Schuck	1951	1955
Jack R. Adams	1955	1959
John J. Gast	1959	1963
Charles L. Ihlenfeld	1964	1967
James L. Rogers	1967	1971
James J. Haranzo	1971	1975
John E. Fahey	1975	1979
Cuyler E. Ewing	1979	1981
William H. Muegge	1981	1984
John W. Lipphardt	1984	1985
Stella C. Koerner	1985	1988
Thomas J. Baller	1988	1992
John W. Lipphardt	1992	2000
Nicholas A. Sparachane	2000	2008
Andy McKenzie	2008	2014
Glenn Elliott	2014	2024
Denny Magruder	2024	

== See also ==
- Wheeling, West Virginia
