= Barnett Hospital and Nursing School =

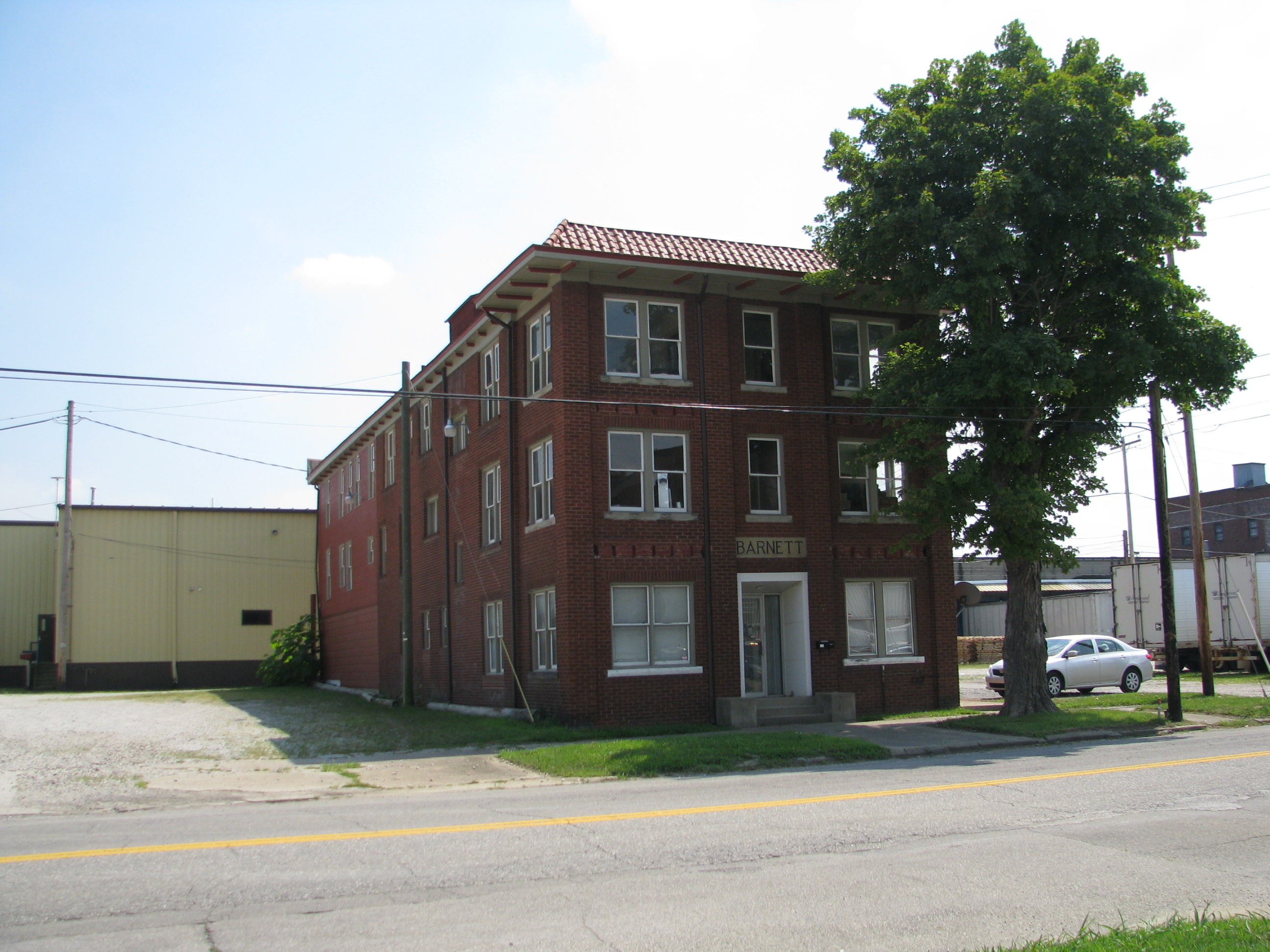

Geography
- Location: West Virginia, United States

History
- Opened: 1912
- Closed: 1939

Links
- Lists: Hospitals in West Virginia
- Barnett Hospital and Nursing School
- U.S. National Register of Historic Places
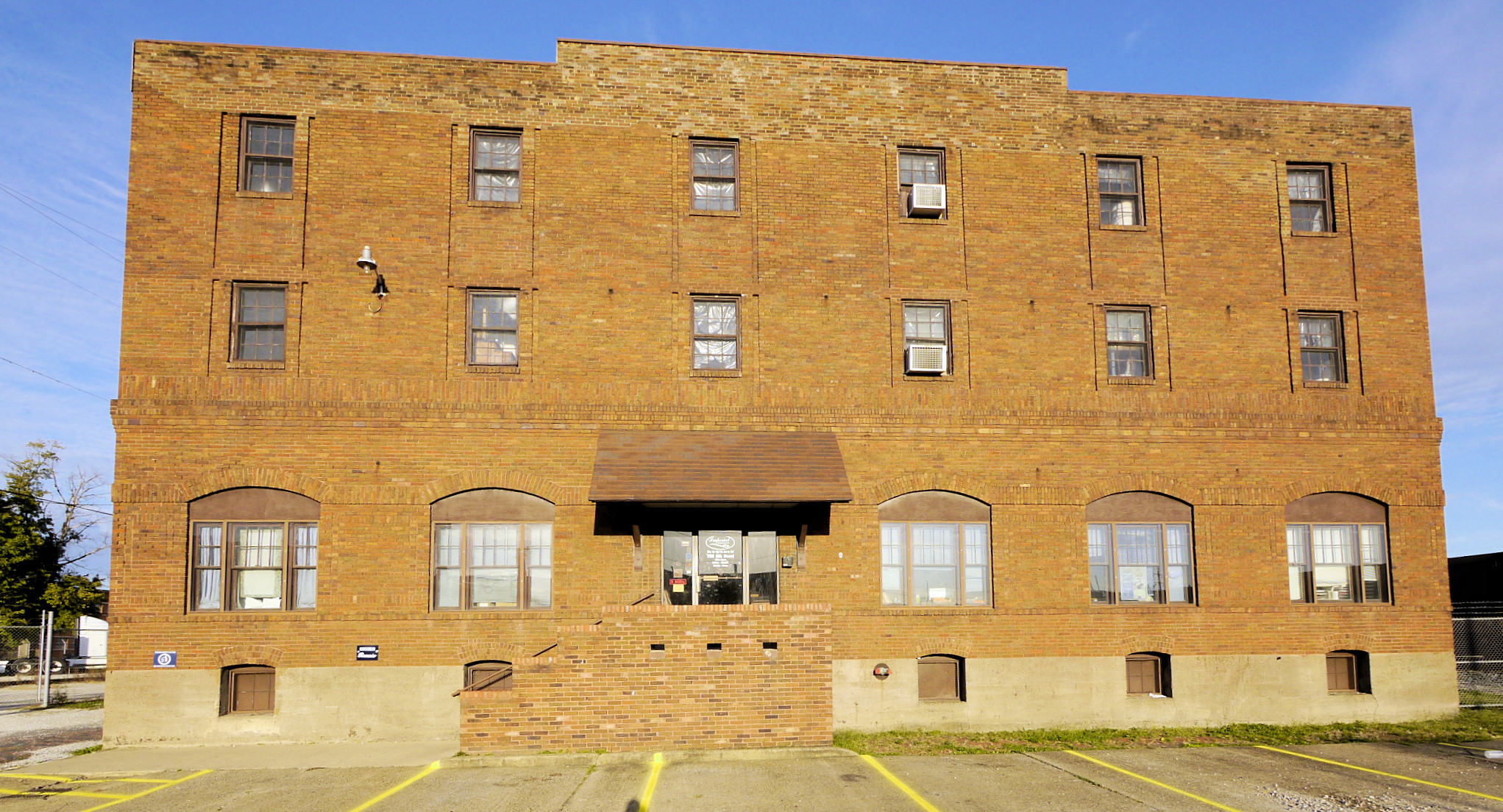
- Barnett Hospital and Nursing School, October 2012

- Location within West Virginia Location within the United States
- Location: 1201 7th Ave., Huntington, West Virginia
- Coordinates: 38°25′3″N 82°26′15″W
- Area: less than one acre
- Architectural style: Mission/spanish Revival
- NRHP reference No.: 09001190
- Added to NRHP: December 30, 2009

Barnett Hospital and Nursing School is a historic hospital and school building located at Huntington, Cabell County, West Virginia. It is a three-story, rectangular building measuring 29 feet wide and 100 feet deep. It features a low-pitched, Mediterranean-style, hipped roof with clay Spanish tile. The original building was built as a frame dwelling, with subsequent additions in 1912, 1918, and 1925. The hospital was opened in 1912 by Dr. Clinton Constantine “C.C.” Barnett and served the African American population of Huntington. The Barnett Nursing School opened in 1918. The hospital closed in 1939. The Trustees of International Hod Carriers’, Building and Common Laborers’ Union owned the building from 1947 until 2007.

It was listed on the National Register of Historic Places in 2009.

== See also ==
- National Register of Historic Places listings in Cabell County, West Virginia
