= Elm Grove Stone Arch Bridge =

- U.S. National Register of Historic Places
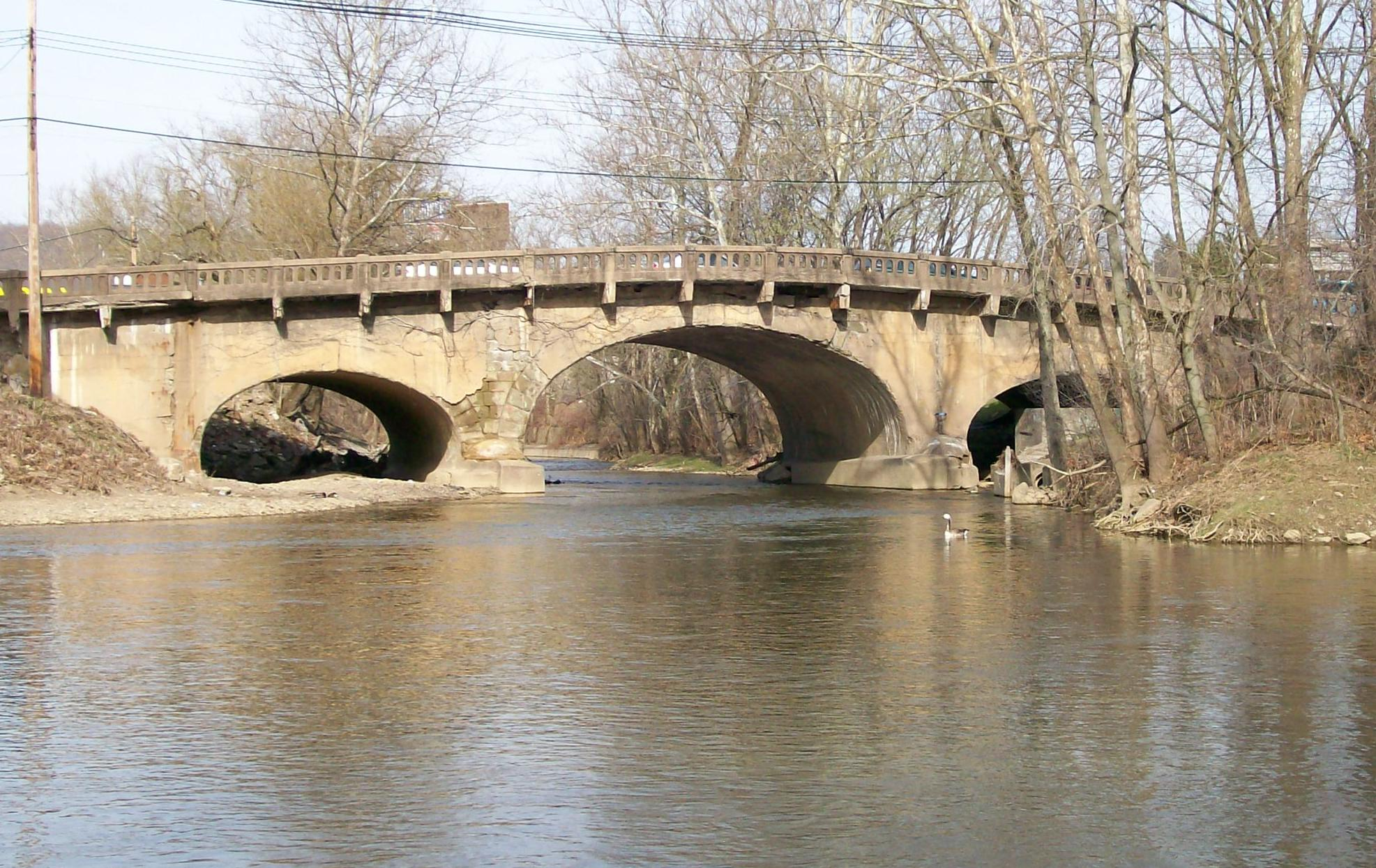
- The bridge in 2010

- Location within West Virginia Location within the United States
- Location: US 40, Wheeling, West Virginia
- Coordinates: 40°2′36.89″N 80°39′31.55″W
- Area: 0.5 acres (0.20 ha)
- Built: 1817
- Architect: Moses Shepherd
- Architectural style: Stone Arch
- NRHP reference No.: 81000606
- Added to NRHP: August 21, 1981

The Elm Grove Stone Arch Bridge, also known as the Monument Place Bridge, is the oldest extant bridge, built in 1817, in the U.S. state of West Virginia. The bridge carries U.S. Route 40 over Little Wheeling Creek in Elm Grove. The bridge was placed on the National Register of Historic Places on August 21, 1981.

== History ==
Colonel Moses Shepherd (1763–1832), son of David Shepherd and Rachel (née Teague) Shepherd and first husband of Lydia (née Boggs) Shepherd Cruger (1766–1867), moved to Wheeling with his parents and siblings from Shepherdstown, West Virginia about 1771 and built his prominent home, Shepherd Hall, in 1798. Shepherd rose to prominence in the area and befriended House Speaker Henry Clay, a friendship credited with the National Road running through Wheeling as well as Shepherd being awarded contracts to construct all bridges along the National Road in Ohio County

The construction on the bridge began in 1817 and was completed later the same year. The bridge saw remodeling in 1931 and reinforced in 1953. The bridge is still in use today, still carrying traffic along Route 40.

== Appearance ==
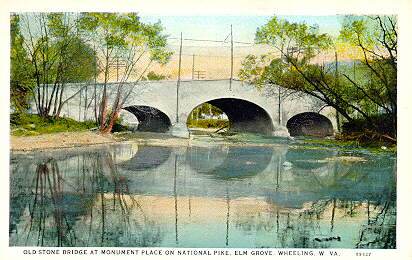
1920 postcard of the bridge.

The Elm Grove Stone Arch Bridge is a 3 span stone arched bridge. The bridge is constructed with solid uncoarsed limestone blocks. The bridge reaches 208 feet in length over the Little Wheeling Creek below. The middle arch spans 38 feet with two arches to either side spanning 25 feet. The arches are shaped in an ellipse pattern rather than the popular semicircular pattern for aesthetic reasons giving the bridge a "humpback" appearance.

Original buttresses were removed in 1931 to make room for sidewalks on either side of the driving lanes. In 1953 the bridge was sprayed with gunite to reinforce and strengthen the bridge. The road has been paved with asphalt several times but has not destroyed the natural integrity in which it was designed and built in 1817.

== See also ==
- National Register of Historic Places listings in Ohio County, West Virginia
- National Register of Historic Places listings in West Virginia
