= Greenwood Cemetery (Wheeling, West Virginia) =

Cemetery in Ohio County, West Virginia

Coordinates: 40°03′42″N 80°40′45″W

- Interactive map of Greenwood Cemetery

Details
- Location: 1526 National Road, Wheeling, West Virginia
- Type: Non-denominational

Greenwood Cemetery is a cemetery in Ohio County, West Virginia, United States. It is located at 1526 National Road in Wheeling. The cemetery is maintained and operated by the Greenwood Cemetery Association. Members of several notable Wheeling families and natives including United States Congressmen Carl G. Bachmann, Chester D. Hubbard, William P. Hubbard, John O. Pendleton, and Benjamin Stanton, as well as Metropolitan Opera soprano Eleanor Steber, Medal of Honor recipient Daniel A. Woods, and architect Frederick F. Faris, are buried in the Cemetery.
