= Tyler Heights, West Virginia =

- Unincorporated community
- Location within West Virginia Location within the United States
- Coordinates: 38°25′52″N 81°45′13″W
- Country: United States
- State: West Virginia
- County: Kanawha
- Elevation: 689 ft (210 m)
- Time zone: UTC-5 (Eastern (EST))
  - Summer (DST): UTC-4 (EDT)
- Area codes: 304 & 681
- GNIS feature ID: 1554471

Tyler Heights, also known as Flatwoods, is an unincorporated community in Kanawha County, West Virginia, United States. Tyler Heights is located along West Virginia Route 622 at its junction with West Virginia Route 501, 5 miles (8.0 km) east-northeast of Nitro.
