= Liggett and Myers Tobacco Company (Huntington, West Virginia) =

- U.S. National Register of Historic Places
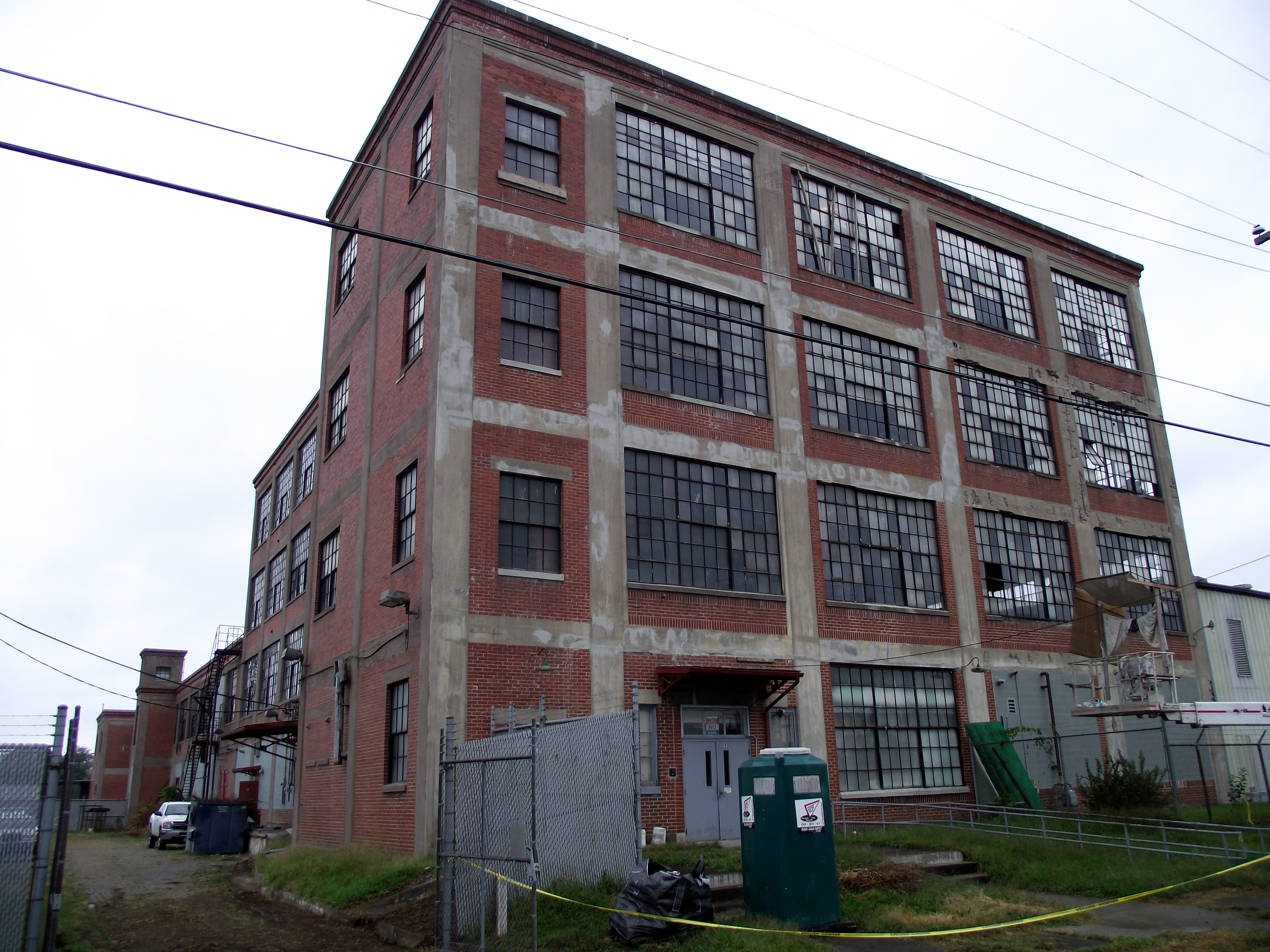
- Front and side of the facility

- Location within West Virginia Location within the United States
- Location: 9 27th St., Huntington, West Virginia
- Coordinates: 38°26′2″N 82°24′33″W
- Area: 7.2 acres (2.9 ha)
- Built: 1910
- Architectural style: Early Commercial
- NRHP reference No.: 98001073
- Added to NRHP: August 14, 1998

Liggett and Myers Tobacco Company is a historic factory building located at Huntington, Cabell County, West Virginia, USA. The original building was constructed in 1917 and is a four-story, red brick, Commercial Style warehouse building, measuring 140 by 80 feet (43 by 24 m). At the rear of the building is an addition built in 1920. It is a two-story, red brick, Commercial Style warehouse building, measuring 210 by 80 feet (64 by 24 m). Also on the property is the redrying plant, built in 1910. It is a long, one story brick industrial building with a gable roof. The complex was built by the Liggett & Myers Tobacco Company as a tobacco warehouse and cigarette factory.

It was listed on the National Register of Historic Places in 1998.

== See also ==
- National Register of Historic Places listings in Cabell County, West Virginia
