= Sam Hood Field =

Defunct soccer stadium in Huntington, West Virginia

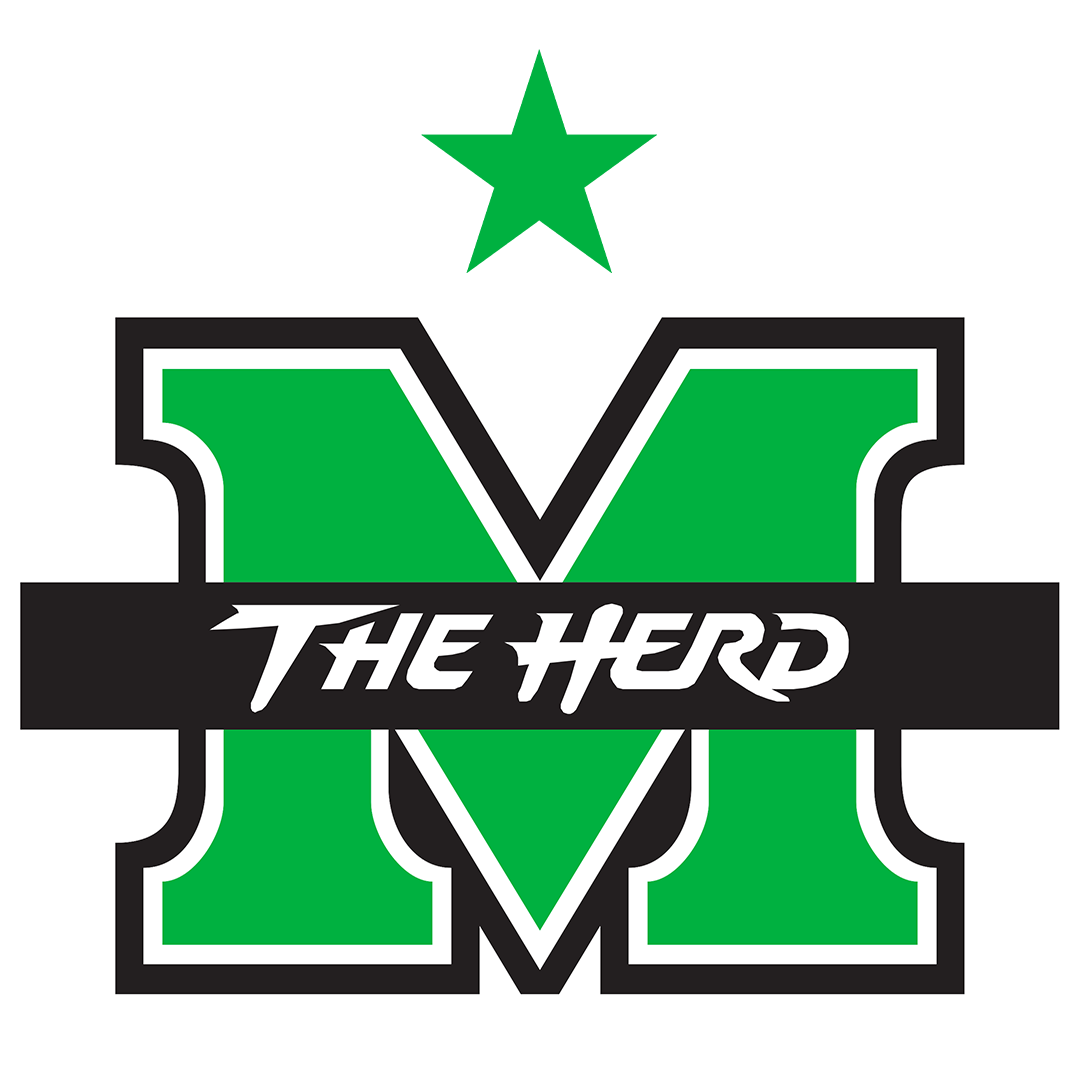
- Interactive map of Sam Hood Field
- Location: Huntington, West Virginia
- Coordinates: 38.424762°N 82.419144°W
- Owner: Marshall University
- Operator: Marshall Univ. Athletics
- Capacity: 1,500
- Surface: Grass

Construction
- Groundbreaking: 1995
- Built: 1996
- Opened: September 1, 1996
- Closed: October 30, 2011; 14 years ago
- Demolished: 2012

Tenants
- Marshall Thundering Herd (NCAA) teams: men's & women's soccer (1996–2011)

Sam Hood Field was a soccer-specific stadium located in Huntington, West Virginia on the campus of Marshall University next to Joan C. Edwards Stadium. The stadium was built by and named for Marshall University alumnus and former head men's soccer coach Stephen M. "Sam" Hood.

The 1,500-seat stadium was built in 1996 and was home to the men's and women's soccer programs from Marshall. Prior to 1996 the teams played at Edwards Stadium and Fairfield Stadium.

Hoops Family Field at the new Veterans Memorial Soccer Complex, located on the site of the Veterans Memorial Fieldhouse, opened in August 2013. The Chris Cline Athletic Complex, a $25 million indoor football practice facility, track, and physical therapy research center which opened in September 2014, sits on the former Sam Hood Field site.
