= Shepherd Hall =

Historic house in West Virginia, United States

- U.S. National Register of Historic Places
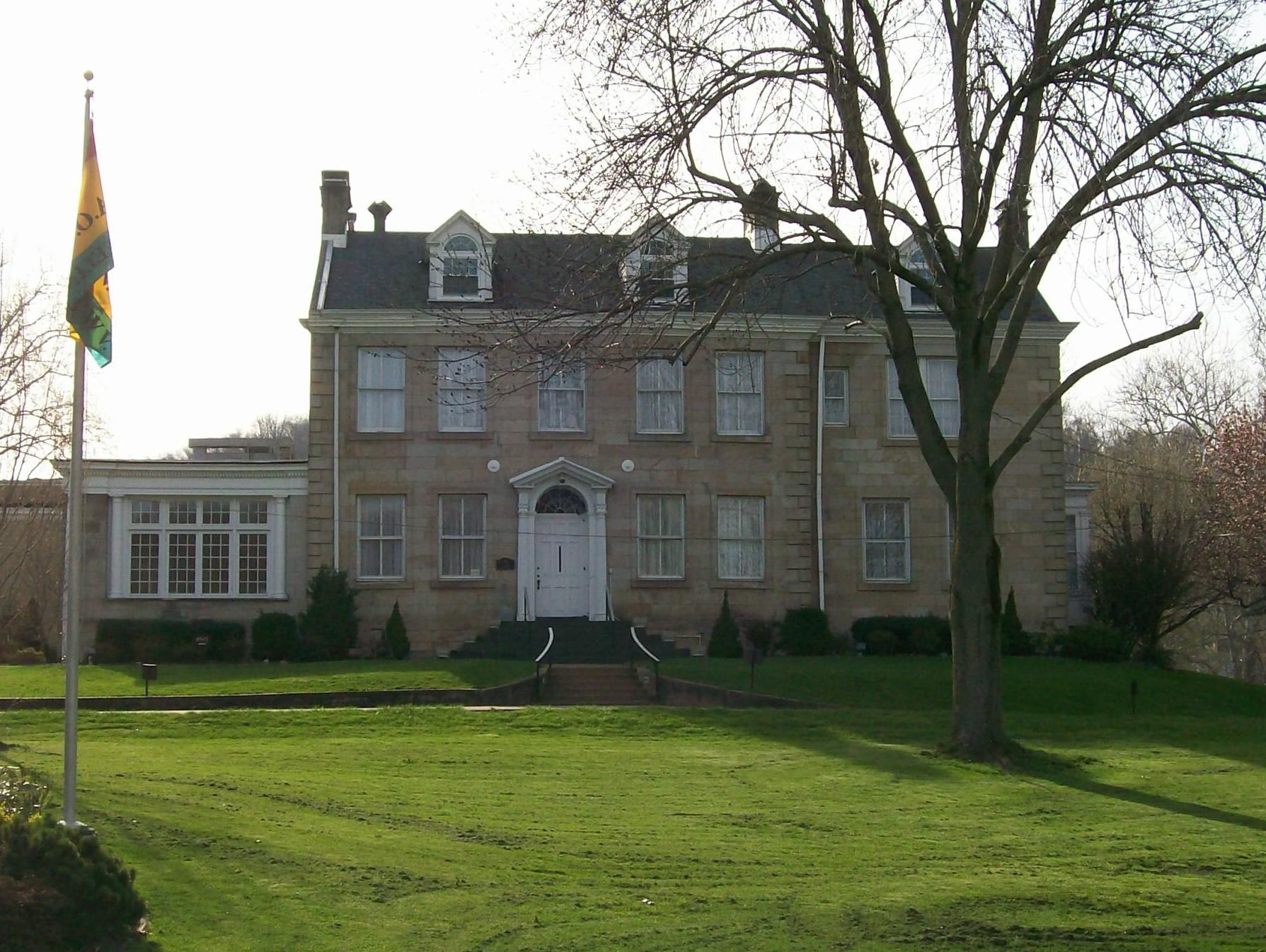
- Shepherd Hall in April 2010.

- Location within West Virginia Location within the United States
- Location: Monument Place and Kruger St., Wheeling, West Virginia
- Coordinates: 40°2′33″N 80°39′33″W
- Area: 4 acres (1.6 ha)
- Built: 1798
- NRHP reference No.: 70000661
- Added to NRHP: December 18, 1970

Shepherd Hall, also known as Monument Place and formerly as Stone Mansion, is a historic house listed on the National Register of Historic Places in the city of Wheeling in the U.S. state of West Virginia. It is located in the Elm Grove area of Wheeling, Ohio County, West Virginia.

== History of Shepherd Hall ==
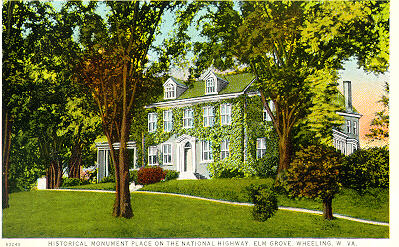
Monument Place, ca. 1910

Shepherd Hall (later known as Stone Mansion and now Monument Place) was built in 1798 by Moses Shepherd (November 11, 1763 – April 29, 1832). He and his wife, Lydia (née Boggs) Shepherd (February 26, 1766 – September 29, 1867), resided there on the grounds of their plantation.

Moses Shepherd and his family migrated from Mecklenburg, Frederick County (later Berkeley County), Virginia (now Shepherdstown, Jefferson County, West Virginia) to the District of West Augusta, Virginia (later Ohio County, Virginia and now Ohio County, West Virginia) about 1771 and settled on the banks of Wheeling Creek, a tributary of the Ohio River, near the Forks of Wheeling Creek where Big Wheeling Creek collects Little Wheeling Creek. Moses Shepherd's father built Fort Shepherd upon this land and operated a large plantation and grist mill. The fort was burned to the ground by Native Americans. Moses Shepherd inherited this land upon his father's death in 1795 and continued to operate the plantation. Shepherd Hall was built on the site of the former Fort Shepherd.

Moses Shepherd was the son of David Shepherd and Rachel (née Teague) Shepherd. He met Lydia Boggs during the last siege of Fort Henry on the Ohio River, the fort that defended the early settlers of the Wheeling area against Native American attacks, in September 1782. The Shepherd and Boggs families were both taking refuge inside the fort during the siege. Moses Shepherd and Lydia Boggs married about 1783, but they had no children together during the course of their almost fifty years of marriage.

Lydia Boggs was the daughter of John Boggs and Jane (née Irwin) Boggs. The Boggs Family migrated from Back Creek Valley, Frederick County (later Berkeley County), Virginia (now West Virginia), and John Boggs staked his claim to an area of land lying along a creek (which is a tributary of the Ohio River) just south of Wheeling in 1774 where he settled with his family. The creek and the land surrounding it became known as Boggs Run, and a portion of Boggs Run near the mouth of the creek is now part of Benwood, West Virginia in Marshall County.

Moses and Lydia Shepherd moved into Shepherd Hall upon its completion in 1798 and became very wealthy through the operation of their plantation and grist mill and the construction of bridges over Wheeling Creek built by Moses Shepherd. Most notably is the Elm Grove Stone Arch Bridge, which was built by Moses Shepherd over Little Wheeling Creek in 1817 and is still in use today. Every year, Moses and Lydia Shepherd traveled to Washington, D.C., and met many famous politicians and presidents of their time. Several presidents, such as Andrew Jackson and James K. Polk, famous politicians, such as Henry Clay, and other prominent citizens called on the Shepherds at Shepherd Hall when passing through the Wheeling area. The Marquis de Lafayette (1757–1834) is said to have visited the mansion as well in 1825 while visiting Wheeling. One of the politicians that the Shepherds established a good friendship with was Henry Clay (1777–1852), who represented the state of Kentucky in both the Senate and House of Representatives and was eventually elected to Speaker of the House. With Clay's help, they were very influential in diverting the National Road to pass through Wheeling in Ohio County rather than Wellsburg in Brooke County in 1818. In fact, the National Road passes right by Shepherd Hall (Monument Place).

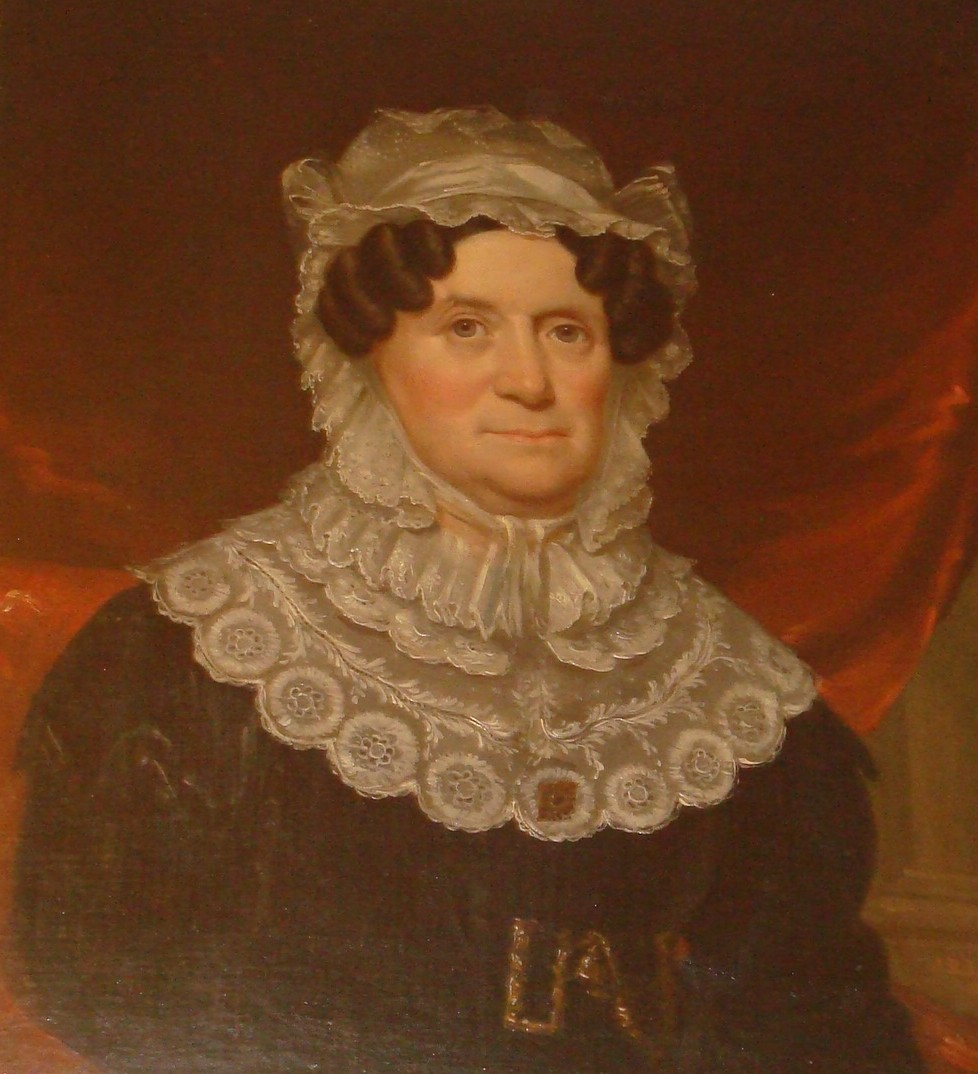
Portrait of Lydia Boggs Shepherd Cruger (1766 - 1867) painted in 1832 by James Reid Lambdin

Moses Shepherd died at Shepherd Hall of cholera on April 29, 1832, at the age of 68 during a cholera epidemic plaguing Wheeling after a devastating flood. Lydia Boggs Shepherd, now a wealthy widow, remarried to widower Daniel Cruger (December 22, 1780 – July 12, 1843), one year later on July 16, 1833, in Ohio County, Virginia (now West Virginia). Daniel Cruger, fourteen years her junior, was a United States Congressman from Steuben County, New York, and they had met in Washington, D.C., during her many trips there with her first husband, Moses Shepherd. Lydia Boggs Shepherd Cruger changed the name of the mansion from Shepherd Hall to Stone Mansion during the ten years of her marriage to Daniel Cruger. Daniel Cruger died suddenly of apoplexy on July 12, 1843, at the age of 62 during a bank meeting in Wheeling.

Lydia Boggs Shepherd Cruger lived the last twenty-four years of her life in solitude in the mansion (a few of her slaves remained on the plantation to care for her), occasionally receiving visitors and relatives eager to hear first hand accounts of Wheeling's history. In 1849 when she was 83 years old, she caused a heated controversy when she swore out an affidavit discrediting Betty Zane as the heroine of the gunpowder exploit during the 1782 siege of Fort Henry sixty-seven years after the event in which she was one of the last surviving eyewitnesses. She had resided in Shepherd Hall from the time the mansion was built in 1798 until she died there at the age of 101 on September 29, 1867.

After Lydia Boggs Shepherd Cruger died in 1867, the vast Shepherd plantation was sold off into lots, thus becoming the area known as Elm Grove in Wheeling, West Virginia. Shepherd Hall was purchased in 1870 by Alonzo Loring (1820–1898) and his wife, Mary Caldwell (née Chapline) Patterson Loring (1830–1887), and changed its name to Monument Place. Ownership of the mansion eventually passed to their daughter Lucy Loring Milton. She made structural additions to the mansion in 1907. The Osiris Shrine Temple purchased Monument Place after the 1926 death of Lucy Loring Milton and retain ownership to the present day.

Monument Place derives its name from a monument that Lydia and Moses Shepherd had erected on their property near the National Road in 1820 dedicated to Henry Clay for his support in bringing the National Road to Wheeling. The monument no longer stands.

As the neighborhood of Elm Grove in Wheeling developed, the street that passes directly in front of Shepherd Hall (Monument Place) was given the name Cruger Street, but Cruger was misspelled Kruger. The misspelled version of the surname was never corrected, and the street retains the name of Kruger Street to the present day.

== Stone Church Cemetery ==
Moses Shepherd, Lydia Boggs Shepherd Cruger and Daniel Cruger are all buried in Stone Church Cemetery in Elm Grove, Wheeling, Ohio County, West Virginia, which is situated on a nearby hill overlooking Shepherd Hall (Monument Place). The cemetery was once part of the Shepherd plantation, and the land for the cemetery was given to the congregation of the Stone Presbyterian Church in 1795 by David Shepherd, the father of Moses Shepherd, who is also buried in the cemetery along with his wife and the mother of Moses Shepherd, Rachel Teague Shepherd. Several members of the Chapline, Patterson, Loring and Milton families, such as Lucy Loring Milton, her husband Charles Milton and her parents Alonzo Loring and Mary Chapline Patterson Loring, are also buried in Stone Church Cemetery.

== See also ==
- List of historic sites in Ohio County, West Virginia
- List of Registered Historic Places in West Virginia
