= Pocatalico, West Virginia =

- Unincorporated community
- Location within West Virginia Location within the United States
- Coordinates: 38°29′25″N 81°38′50″W
- Country: United States
- State: West Virginia
- County: Kanawha
- Elevation: 732 ft (223 m)
- Time zone: UTC-5 (Eastern (EST))
  - Summer (DST): UTC-4 (EDT)
- Area codes: 304 & 681
- GNIS feature ID: 1545081

Pocatalico is an unincorporated community in Kanawha County, West Virginia, United States. Pocatalico is located along Interstate 77 south of and near Sissonville.

== History ==
A post office called Pocatalico was established in 1828, and remained in operation until it was discontinued in 1934. The community took its name from the nearby Pocatalico River, which means "river of the fat doe" in a Native American language.
