= National Register of Historic Places listings in Kanawha County, West Virginia =

Location of Kanawha County in West Virginia

This is a list of the National Register of Historic Places listings in Kanawha County, West Virginia.

This is intended to be a complete list of the properties and districts on the National Register of Historic Places in Kanawha County, West Virginia, United States. The locations of National Register properties and districts for which the latitude and longitude coordinates are included below, may be seen in an online map.

There are 91 properties and districts listed on the National Register in the county.

This National Park Service list is complete through NPS recent listings posted August 28, 2026.

Contents: Counties in West Virginia

Barbour - Berkeley - Boone - Braxton - Brooke - Cabell - Calhoun - Clay - Doddridge - Fayette - Gilmer - Grant - Greenbrier - Hampshire - Hancock - Hardy - Harrison - Jackson - Jefferson - Kanawha - Lewis - Lincoln - Logan - Marion - Marshall - Mason - McDowell - Mercer - Mineral - Mingo - Monongalia - Monroe - Morgan - Nicholas - Ohio - Pendleton - Pleasants - Pocahontas - Preston - Putnam - Raleigh - Randolph - Ritchie - Roane - Summers - Taylor - Tucker - Tyler - Upshur - Wayne - Webster - Wetzel - Wirt - Wood - Wyoming

== Current listings ==
	Name on the Register	Image	Date listed	Location	City or town	Description
1	African Zion Baptist Church	African Zion Baptist Church	December 27, 1974 (#74002010)	4104 Malden Dr. 38°17′58″N 81°33′26″W	Malden	
2	Bank of St. Albans Building	Bank of St. Albans Building	February 1, 1988 (#87002518)	80 Olde Main Plaza; 38°23′11″N 81°50′21″W	St. Albans	
3	Barnes-Wellford House	Barnes-Wellford House	October 26, 1984 (#84000390)	66 Abney Circle; 38°20′18″N 81°38′28″W	Charleston	
4	The Beeches	The Beeches	April 20, 1979 (#79002586)	805 Kanawha Ter. 38°22′55″N 81°49′49″W	St. Albans	
5	Beni Kedem Shrine Temple	Beni Kedem Shrine Temple	November 12, 2024 (#100011004)	100 Quarrier Street; 38°21′18″N 81°38′28″W	Charleston	
6	Bird Haven	Bird Haven	October 26, 1984 (#84000393)	733 Myrtle Rd. 38°20′12″N 81°38′35″W	Charleston	
7	Daniel Boone Hotel	Daniel Boone Hotel	August 21, 1984 (#84003602)	405 Capitol St. 38°21′05″N 81°37′56″W	Charleston	
8	Bougemont Complex	Bougemont Complex	October 26, 1984 (#84000395)	Bougemont Dr. 38°20′25″N 81°38′03″W	Charleston	
9	Breezemont	Breezemont	April 15, 1982 (#82004324)	915 Breezemont Dr. 38°21′48″N 81°38′16″W	Charleston	
10	Briarwood	Briarwood	October 26, 1984 (#84000396)	1240 Staunton Rd. 38°20′13″N 81°38′07″W	Charleston	
11	Canty House	Canty House	September 23, 1988 (#88001587)	WV 25; 38°22′57″N 81°45′48″W	Institute	
12	Cedar Grove	Cedar Grove	March 10, 1975 (#75001893)	Southeast of the junction of U.S. Route 60 and Kanawha and James River Turnpike; 38°13′17″N 81°25′41″W	Cedar Grove	
13	Charleston Baptist Temple	Charleston Baptist Temple	April 4, 2000 (#00000252)	209 Morris St. 38°20′43″N 81°37′44″W	Charleston	
14	Charleston City Hall	Charleston City Hall	June 6, 1988 (#88000639)	Court and Virginia Sts. 38°21′02″N 81°38′20″W	Charleston	
15	Charleston Municipal Auditorium	Charleston Municipal Auditorium	November 22, 1999 (#99001398)	224-232 Virginia St. E. 38°21′10″N 81°38′24″W	Charleston	
16	Charmco Building	Charmco Building	November 30, 2020 (#100005828)	606 Morris St. 38°20′55″N 81°37′27″W	Charleston	
17	Chesapeake and Ohio Depot	Chesapeake and Ohio Depot	October 26, 1984 (#84000782)	305 MacCorkle Ave. 38°20′47″N 81°38′18″W	Charleston	
18	Chilton House	Chilton House	April 29, 1977 (#77001376)	Off U.S. Route 60; 38°23′13″N 81°50′24″W	St. Albans	
19	W.E. Chilton II House	W.E. Chilton II House	October 26, 1984 (#84000397)	1266 Louden Heights Rd. 38°19′57″N 81°38′40″W	Charleston	
20	Clendenin Historic District	Clendenin Historic District	May 2, 1996 (#96000442)	Roughly bounded by First Ave. and Kanawha Ave. between 5th St. and French St. 38°29′22″N 81°20′51″W	Clendenin	
21	Coal River Locks, Dams, and Log Booms Archeological District		November 24, 1997 (#97001417)	Address Restricted	Alum Creek	
22	Cox-Morton House	Cox-Morton House	October 26, 1984 (#84000399)	640 Holley Rd. 38°20′51″N 81°38′41″W	Charleston	
23	Cox-Parks House	Cox-Parks House	October 26, 1984 (#84000400)	710 Myrtle Rd. 38°20′47″N 81°38′43″W	Charleston	
24	Craik-Patton House	Craik-Patton House	August 12, 1970 (#75001894)	U.S. Route 60 in Daniel Boone Roadside Park; 38°19′54″N 81°35′10″W	Charleston	
25	Crawford-Gardner House	Crawford-Gardner House	October 26, 1984 (#84000401)	743 Myrtle Rd. 38°20′43″N 81°38′34″W	Charleston	
26	Dalgain	Dalgain	October 26, 1984 (#84000404)	1223 Staunton Rd. 38°20′18″N 81°38′15″W	Charleston	
27	Danner-Fletcher House	Danner-Fletcher House	October 26, 1984 (#84000405)	626 Holley Rd. 38°20′52″N 81°38′46″W	Charleston	
28	Downtown Charleston Historic District	Downtown Charleston Historic District	March 24, 2006 (#06000166)	Roughly bounded by Washington St. E, Leon Sullivan Way, Kanawha Blvd., and Summers St.; also roughly bounded by Washington Street East, Morris Street, Kanawha Boulevard, and Summers Street; 38°21′02″N 81°38′03″W	Charleston	Second set of addresses represent a boundary increase approved August 31, 2026.
29	Dutch Hollow Wine Cellars	Dutch Hollow Wine Cellars	December 18, 1970 (#70000654)	Dutch Hollow Rd. 38°22′20″N 81°44′24″W	Dunbar	
30	East End Historic District	East End Historic District	April 20, 1978 (#78002800)	Roughly bounded by the Kanawha River, Bradford, Quarrier, and Greenbrier Sts.; also roughly bounded by Dixie, Greenbrier, and Lee Sts., and East and Shelton Alleys; 38°20′16″N 81°36′53″W	Charleston	Second set of addresses represent a boundary increase of December 16, 2014
31	East Hall	East Hall	September 26, 1988 (#88001585)	West Quadrangle, West Virginia State University; 38°22′44″N 81°46′07″W	Institute	
32	Ebenezer Chapel	Ebenezer Chapel	December 16, 1974 (#74002011)	Ohio Ave. S. at Hillview Dr. 38°14′30″N 81°33′59″W	Marmet	
33	Edgewood Historic District	Edgewood Historic District	November 9, 1989 (#89001800)	Roughly bounded by Edgewood Dr., Highland, Beech, Chester, and Lower Chester; 38°22′03″N 81°38′42″W	Charleston	
34	William H. & William S. Edwards House		May 11, 1990 (#90000713)	WV 61 northeast of Cabin Creek; 38°12′13″N 81°27′56″W	Coalburg	
35	Five Corners Historic District		March 8, 2022 (#100007165)	Virginia St. West, Central Ave., 6th St., Elm St., Delaware Ave. 38°21′43″N 81°38′56″W	Charleston	
36	Fort Scammon	Fort Scammon	March 26, 1976 (#76001939)	Atop Fort Hill; 38°21′07″N 81°39′18″W	Charleston	
37	Garnet High School	Garnet High School	July 24, 1990 (#90001068)	422 Dickinson St. 38°21′04″N 81°37′48″W	Charleston	
38	William S. Gilliland Log Cabin and Cemetery	William S. Gilliland Log Cabin and Cemetery	October 26, 1984 (#84000407)	Louden Heights and Bridge Rd. 38°19′47″N 81°38′48″W	Charleston	Demolished in 2016 "Deteriorated 1840s WV log cabins coming down"
39	Elizabeth Harden Gilmore House	Elizabeth Harden Gilmore House	September 17, 1988 (#88001462)	514 Broad St. (now Leon Sullivan Way); 38°21′03″N 81°37′39″W	Charleston	
40	Good Shepherd Church	Good Shepherd Church	April 26, 1990 (#90000712)	WV 61 southwest of East Bank; 38°12′37″N 81°27′22″W	Coalburg	
41	Grosscup Road Historic District	Grosscup Road Historic District	January 26, 1984 (#84003607)	Grosscup, Roscommon, Roller, and Bridge Rds. 38°20′35″N 81°38′15″W	Charleston	
42	Felix G. Hansford House		January 12, 1984 (#84003611)	Centre and 14th Sts. 38°12′20″N 81°23′39″W	Hansford	
43	John Harriman House	John Harriman House	December 15, 1978 (#78002803)	2233 3rd Ave. 38°12′59″N 81°26′27″W	East Bank	
44	Holly Grove Mansion	Holly Grove Mansion	August 28, 1974 (#74002007)	1710 E. Kanawha Blvd. 38°20′10″N 81°36′54″W	Charleston	
45	Kanawha & Michigan Railway Depot Warehouse		November 14, 2024 (#100011005)	800 Smith Street; 38°21′07″N 81°37′40″W	Charleston	
46	Kanawha County Courthouse	Kanawha County Courthouse	September 6, 1978 (#78002801)	Virginia and Court Sts. 38°21′03″N 81°38′22″W	Charleston	
47	Kanawha State Forest Historic District		March 25, 1993 (#93000228)	County Route 42/43 2.6 miles (4.2 km) south of Charleston; 38°15′56″N 81°43′37″W	Loudendale	
48	Kearse Theater	Kearse Theater	November 28, 1980 (#80004026)	161, 165, and 167 Summers St. 38°21′04″N 81°38′07″W	Charleston	Demolished in 1982.
49	Laidley-Summers-Quarrier House	Laidley-Summers-Quarrier House	December 13, 1978 (#78002802)	800 Orchard St. 38°22′06″N 81°39′02″W	Charleston	
50	Mattie V. Lee Home	Mattie V. Lee Home	June 16, 1992 (#92000303)	810 Donnally St. 38°21′06″N 81°37′51″W	Charleston	
51	Little Brick Church	Little Brick Church	December 16, 1974 (#74002006)	0.75 miles (1.21 km) east of Kelley's Creek on U.S. Route 60; 38°13′03″N 81°25′34″W	Cedar Grove	
52	Littlepage Stone Mansion	Littlepage Stone Mansion	September 2, 1982 (#82004325)	1809 W. Washington St. 38°22′34″N 81°39′58″W	Charleston	
53	Loewenstein and Sons Hardware Building	Loewenstein and Sons Hardware Building	November 1, 1985 (#85003475)	223-225 Capitol St. 38°21′02″N 81°38′05″W	Charleston	
54	Luna Park Historic District	Luna Park Historic District	April 3, 2012 (#12000181)	Roughly bounded by Main St., Glenwood Ave., Delaware Ave., & Kanawha Blvd. W. 38°21′41″N 81°39′11″W	Charleston	
55	MacFarland House	MacFarland House	December 10, 1979 (#79002585)	1310 Kanawha Boulevard; 38°20′35″N 81°37′49″W	Charleston	
56	Malden Historic District	Malden Historic District	July 18, 1980 (#80004028)	Roughly bounded by railroad tracks, the Kanawha River, Georges Dr., and U.S. Route 60; 38°17′49″N 81°33′35″W	Malden	
57	Maple Terrace Court and Walton Apartments	Maple Terrace Court and Walton Apartments	August 22, 2002 (#02000885)	Maple Terrace Court; 38°20′42″N 81°37′39″W	Charleston	
58	McAndrews-Gallaher House	McAndrews-Gallaher House	October 26, 1984 (#84000409)	601 Briarwood Rd. 38°20′46″N 81°38′52″W	Charleston	
59	William E. Mohler House	William E. Mohler House	February 10, 1983 (#83003242)	819 Pennsylvania Ave. 38°23′07″N 81°50′12″W	St. Albans	
60	Plaza Theatre	Plaza Theatre	October 30, 1985 (#85003408)	123 Summers St. 38°21′00″N 81°38′08″W	Charleston	
61	Pratt Historic District	Pratt Historic District	January 12, 1984 (#84003615)	Roughly bounded by Ferry St., the Kanawha River, and Charles and Pratt Aves., including the cemetery 38°12′32″N 81°22′52″W	Pratt	
62	St. Albans Chesapeake and Ohio Railroad Depot	St. Albans Chesapeake and Ohio Railroad Depot	July 9, 1997 (#97000785)	410 4th Ave. 38°23′16″N 81°49′57″W	St. Albans	
63	St. Albans Main Street Historic District	St. Albans Main Street Historic District	November 2, 2000 (#00001315)	Roughly bounded by Main St. between Second St. and B St. 38°23′11″N 81°50′13″W	St. Albans	
64	St. Albans Post Office	St. Albans Post Office	November 4, 1994 (#94001285)	202 Sixth Ave. 38°23′11″N 81°50′09″W	St. Albans	
65	St. Albans Railroad Industry Historic District		March 10, 2021 (#100005412)	4th and 5th Aves., 2nd - 6th Sts. 38°23′15″N 81°50′00″W	St. Albans	
66	St. Albans Site	St. Albans Site	May 3, 1974 (#74002012)	U.S. Route 60 along the Kanawha River; 38°23′09″N 81°48′29″W	St. Albans	
67	St. John's Episcopal Church	St. John's Episcopal Church	November 2, 1989 (#89001782)	11105 Quarrier St. 38°20′49″N 81°37′56″W	Charleston	
68	St. Mark's Episcopal Church	St. Mark's Episcopal Church	November 7, 1977 (#77001377)	405-407 B St. 38°23′18″N 81°50′19″W	St. Albans	
69	St. Paul Baptist Church	St. Paul Baptist Church	April 13, 1998 (#98000285)	821 B St. 38°23′04″N 81°50′20″W	St. Albans	
70	Samuel Shrewsbury, Sr. House	Samuel Shrewsbury, Sr. House	November 2, 1978 (#78002799)	310 Stubb Dr. 38°14′15″N 81°32′39″W	Belle	
71	Simpson Memorial Methodist Episcopal Church	Simpson Memorial Methodist Episcopal Church	August 5, 1991 (#91001011)	607 Shrewsbury St. 38°21′06″N 81°37′44″W	Charleston	
72	Smith-Giltinan House	Smith-Giltinan House	March 20, 2002 (#02000253)	1223 Virginia St., E. 38°20′39″N 81°37′51″W	Charleston	
73	South Charleston Mound	South Charleston Mound	October 15, 1970 (#70000655)	U.S. Route 60, in city park 38°22′07″N 81°41′48″W	South Charleston	
74	Spring Hill Cemetery Historic District	Spring Hill Cemetery Historic District	October 18, 1985 (#85003360)	1554 Farnsworth Dr. 38°21′11″N 81°36′57″W	Charleston	
75	Samuel Starks House	Samuel Starks House	February 1, 1988 (#87002526)	413 Shrewsbury St. 38°21′02″N 81°37′50″W	Charleston	
76	Sterrett Brothers' Dry Goods Store	Sterrett Brothers' Dry Goods Store	November 29, 2001 (#01001329)	112 Capitol St. 38°20′58″N 81°38′08″W	Charleston	
77	Stoneleigh	Stoneleigh	October 26, 1984 (#84000411)	909 Ridgeway Rd. 38°20′17″N 81°38′19″W	Charleston	
78	Summers House	Summers House	November 24, 2015 (#15000841)	805 Loudon Heights Rd. 38°20′25″N 81°38′14″W	Charleston	
79	Sunrise	Sunrise	July 24, 1974 (#74002008)	746 Myrtle Rd. 38°20′44″N 81°38′29″W	Charleston	
80	Thomas-McJunkin-Love House	Thomas-McJunkin-Love House	October 26, 1984 (#84000413)	920 Newton Rd. 38°20′26″N 81°38′23″W	Charleston	
81	Tiskelwah School		April 5, 2023 (#100008821)	600 Florida St. 38°22′08″N 81°39′32″W	Charleston	
82	United Carbon Building	United Carbon Building	July 15, 1994 (#94000720)	1018 Kanawha Blvd., E. 38°20′46″N 81°38′04″W	Charleston	
83	Booker T. Washington High School	Booker T. Washington High School	December 3, 1999 (#99001399)	Wyatt St. off U.S. Route 60; 38°12′04″N 81°22′17″W	London	
84	James Weimer House	James Weimer House	April 14, 2004 (#04000309)	411 8th Ave. 38°23′03″N 81°50′03″W	St. Albans	
85	West Virginia Capitol Complex	West Virginia Capitol Complex	December 31, 1974 (#74002009)	Along Kanawha Boulevard, E. 38°20′11″N 81°36′44″W	Charleston	The West Virginia Capitol Complex consists of two primary sites, the West Virginia State Capitol and West Virginia Governor's Mansion.
86	West Virginia Schools for the Colored Deaf & Blind		March 31, 2021 (#100004950)	Barron Dr. 38°22′51″N 81°46′04″W	Institute	
87	West Virginia State University Faculty House Historic District	West Virginia State University Faculty House Historic District	April 19, 2021 (#100006395)	Faculty and Staff Cir. 38°22′38″N 81°46′10″W	Institute	
88	Col. Henry Hewitt Wood House	Col. Henry Hewitt Wood House	November 28, 1980 (#80004027)	6560 Roosevelt Ave., SE. 38°18′00″N 81°33′46″W	Charleston	
89	Woodrums' Building	Woodrums' Building	April 18, 1996 (#96000439)	602 E. Virginia St. 38°21′01″N 81°38′15″W	Charleston	
90	Carter G. Woodson School		September 5, 2025 (#100012201)	1011 Pennsylvania Avenue; 38°22′57″N 81°50′12″W	St. Albans	
91	Young-Noyes House	Young-Noyes House	April 25, 1991 (#91000446)	2122 Kanawha Ave. 38°20′02″N 81°37′05″W	Charleston	

== Former listing ==
	Name on the Register	Image	Date listed	Date removed	Location	City or town	Description
1	Mother Jones Prison		April 27, 1992 (#92001876)	September 22, 1997	305 Center Street; 38°12′38″N 81°23′01″W	Pratt	Added on April 27, 1992 as National Historic Landmark, delisted in 1997 after demolition in 1996. Included in Pratt Historic District.

== See also ==
- List of National Historic Landmarks in West Virginia
- National Register of Historic Places listings in West Virginia
