= Beni Kedem Shrine Temple =

- U.S. National Register of Historic Places
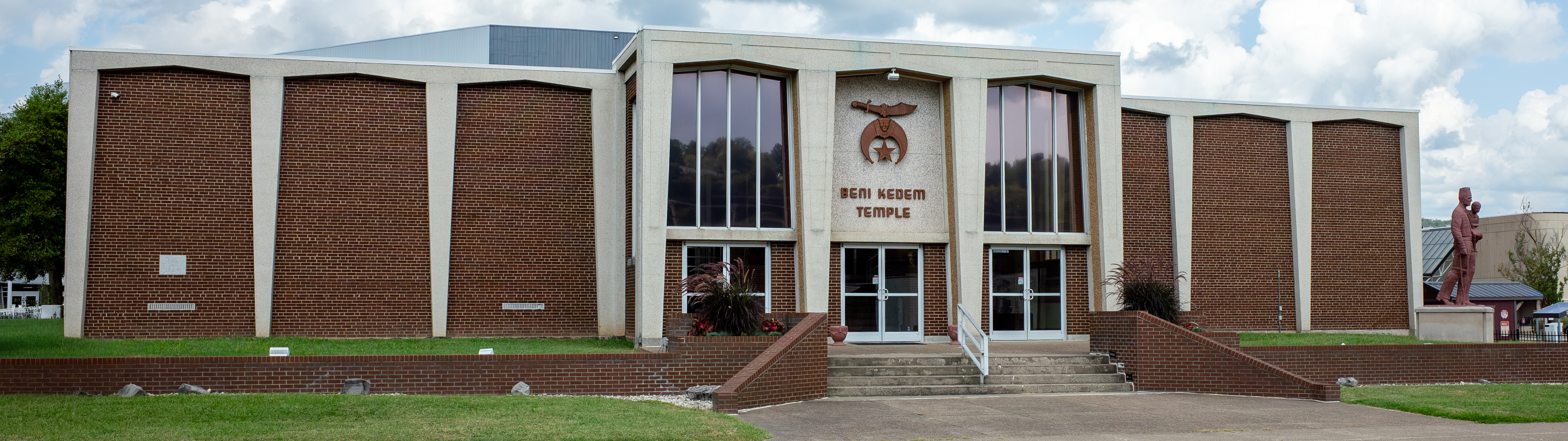
- Beni Kedem Shrine Temple in 2025
- Location: 100 Quarrier Street, Charleston, West Virginia, US
- Coordinates: 38°21′18″N 81°38′28″W
- Built: 1965
- Architectural style: Modern
- NRHP reference No.: 100011004
- Added to NRHP: 2024

The Beni Kedem Shrine Temple is a historic Shriners temple in Charleston, West Virginia, United States. It was added to the National Register of Historic Places in 2024.

== Description ==
The Beni Kedem Temple is located on Quarrier Street in downtown Charleston, West Virginia. The building was designed in 1964 by architects Glenn C. Hancock and Donald L. Moses and constructed between 1964 and 1965 by the Kenhill Construction Company. It is an example of the Modern Movement, with elements of New Formalism.

The structure is composed of concrete, glass, steel, and brick, and features a two-story central tower flanked by one-story wings on either side. It is set on a raised earthen platform with a low brick retaining wall that emphasizes rectilinear symmetry and a strong horizontal composition. The exterior is characterized by largely unadorned masonry wall planes, punctuated by shallow concrete pilasters that introduce vertical massing. Modern materials are used to convey design elements influenced by classical architectural forms.

Exterior alterations to the building have been limited, and include the addition of an ADA-compliant access ramp at the west entrance in 2010 and a shed roof constructed over the terrace in 2023. Interior spaces have undergone only minor renovations and system upgrades. The Beni Kedem Temple is considered a well-preserved example of Modern Movement architecture, and retains a high degree of integrity in its materials, design, workmanship, setting, and overall historic character.

== See also ==
- National Register of Historic Places listings in Kanawha County, West Virginia
