= Stoneleigh =

Stoneleigh may refer to:

== Places ==
=== Australia ===
- Stoneleigh, Darlinghurst, a heritage-listed house in Sydney, New South Wales
- Stoneleigh, Queensland, a locality in the Toowoomba Region

=== Canada ===
- Stoneleigh, Ontario

=== United Kingdom ===
- Stoneleigh, Surrey, England
- Stoneleigh, Warwickshire, England

=== United States ===
- Stoneleigh (Stanleytown, Virginia), USA, the former abode of Governor Thomas B. Stanley
- Stoneleigh (Charleston, West Virginia), listed on the National Register of Historic Places in 1984
- Stoneleigh: A Natural Garden, a 42-acre former estate owned by Natural Lands
- Stoneleigh Historic District, Towson, Maryland

== Other uses ==
- Stoneleigh Park, an agricultural exhibition ground and conference centre in Warwickshire, England
- Stoneleigh Abbey, a country mansion situated to the southwest of the village of Stoneleigh, Warwickshire, England

== See also ==
- Stonely, a hamlet in Cambridgeshire, England
