= Mother Jones (disambiguation) =

Mother Jones may refer to:

- Mary Harris Jones (called "Mother Jones", 1837–1930), American labor and community organizer
- Mother Jones (magazine), progressive American news magazine

== See also ==
- Mother Jones' Prison, formerly a National Historic Landmark in West Virginia
