= Pratt Historic District =

Historic district in West Virginia, United States

- U.S. National Register of Historic Places
- U.S. Historic district
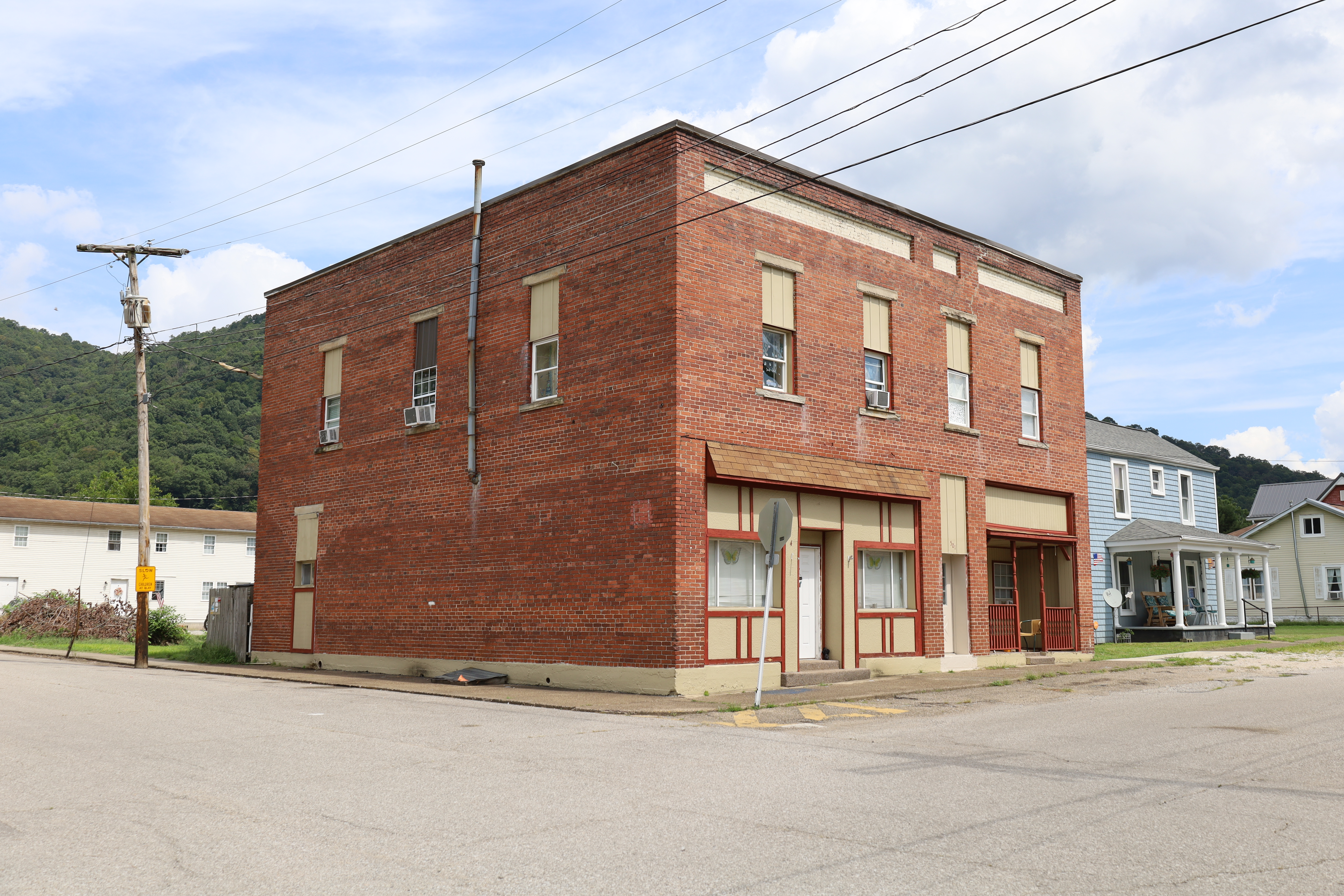
- I.O.O.F. Building in 2021

- Location within West Virginia Location within the United States
- Location: Roughly bounded by Ferry St., Kanawha River, Charles and Pratt Aves. incl. cemetery, Pratt, West Virginia
- Coordinates: 38°12′32″N 81°22′52″W
- Area: 38.4 acres (15.5 ha)
- Architect: Multiple
- Architectural style: Late Victorian, Mixed (more Than 2 Styles From Different Periods)
- NRHP reference No.: 84003615
- Added to NRHP: January 12, 1984

Pratt Historic District is a national historic district located at Pratt, Kanawha County, West Virginia. The district includes 67 contributing buildings and one contributing site. The primarily residential district includes some notable commercial, ecclesiastical, civic, and industrial buildings dated as early as the 1820s. Notable buildings include the Charles Pratt Mining Company office (c. 1889), I.O.O.F. Building (c. 1922-1923), Samuel Hanna House (c. 1830-1840), Jim Shields Corner (c. 1880), James Trimble House, Weaver-Grose House (c. 1905), Burke-Mooney House, Boyer House (c. 1910), The Blue House, Perry-Holt House (c. 1896), Old Town Hall (c. 1875), The Cooperage, and Pratt Cemetery. The delisted Mother Jones Prison was once located in the district.

It was listed on the National Register of Historic Places in 1984.
