= Felix G. Hansford House =

Historic house in West Virginia, United States

- U.S. National Register of Historic Places
- Location within West Virginia Location within the United States
- Location: Centre and 14th Sts. Hansford, West Virginia
- Coordinates: 38°12′20″N 81°23′39″W
- Area: 1 acre (0.40 ha)
- Built: 1824
- Architect: Felix G. Hansford
- Architectural style: Federal
- NRHP reference No.: 84003611
- Added to NRHP: January 12, 1984

The Felix G. Hansford House was built in 1824 by Mr. Felix G. Hansford, president of the Giles, Fayette and Kanawha Turnpike Company. It is the oldest building in the town of Hansford, West Virginia.

The house is listed on the National Register of Historic Places. The house sat empty from the 90s and began falling apart. Attempts to find the owner were unfruitful.
