= St. Albans Main Street Historic District =

Historic district in West Virginia, United States

- U.S. National Register of Historic Places
- U.S. Historic district
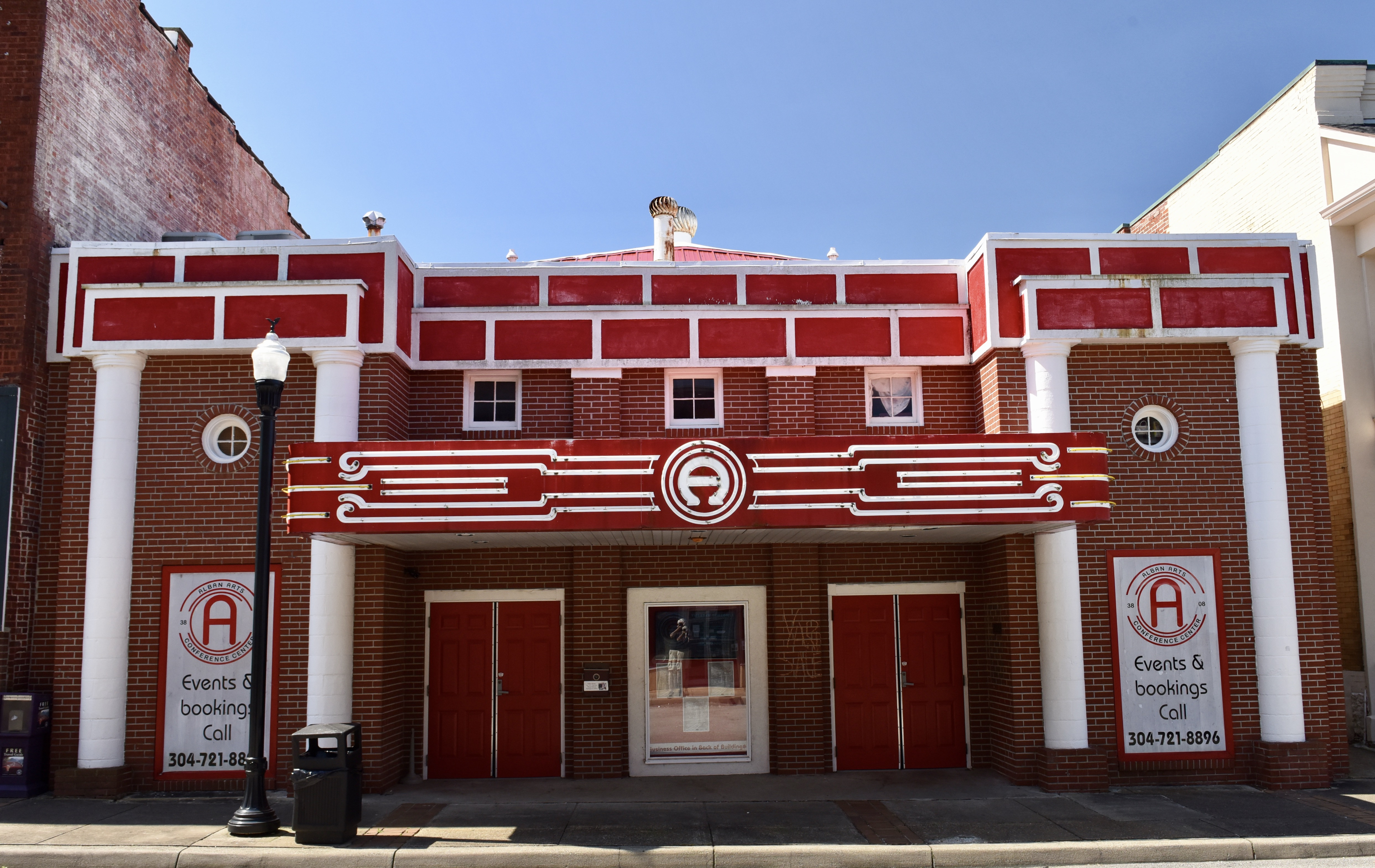
- Alban Theater

- Location within West Virginia Location within the United States
- Location: Roughly bounded by Main St. bet. Second St. and B St., St. Albans, West Virginia
- Coordinates: 38.3860°N 81.8375°W
- Area: 4 acres (1.6 ha)
- Built: 1906
- Architect: Martens, Walter
- Architectural style: Colonial Revival, Classical Revival, et al.
- NRHP reference No.: 00001315
- Added to NRHP: November 2, 2000

St. Albans Main Street Historic District is a national historic district located at St. Albans, Kanawha County, West Virginia. The district includes 22 contributing buildings in the central business district of St. Albans. They were constructed following two fires in 1906 that destroyed the original frame structures. Notable buildings include the Ivanhoe Lodge No. 71 (c. 1910), Hamrick Hospital / Braley Thompson Learning Center (c. 1940), Alban Theater (c. 1937), Old First National Bank & Post Office (c. 1910), First Baptist Church (1907, 1922, 1938), and the Washington Lodge No. 58 (c. 1926), designed by Walter F. Martens. Located in the district and separately listed is the Bank of St. Albans Building is

It was listed on the National Register of Historic Places in 2000.
