= James Weimer House =

Historic house in West Virginia, United States

- U.S. National Register of Historic Places
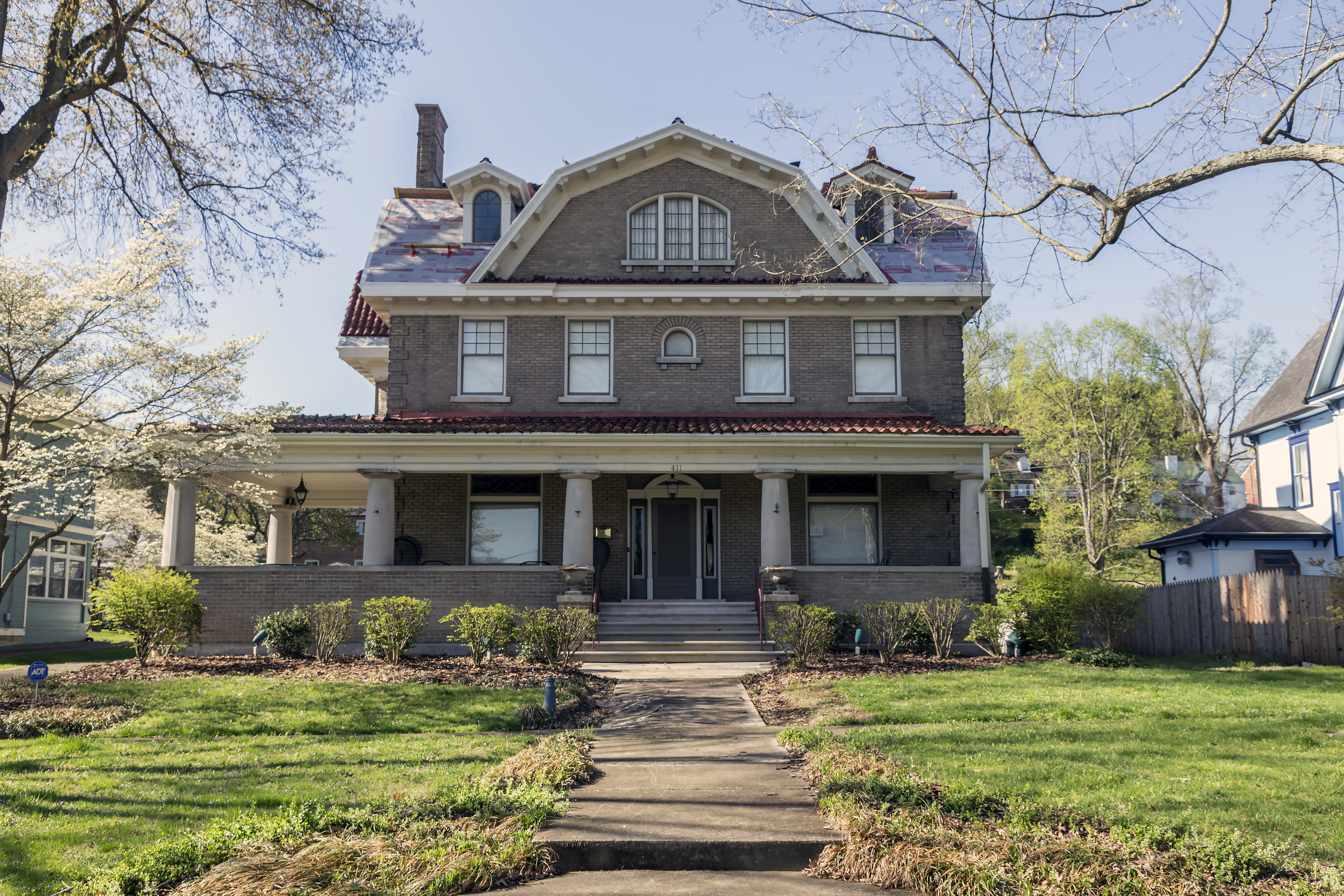
- James Weimer House in 2016

- Location within West Virginia Location within the United States
- Location: 411 Eighth Ave, St. Albans, West Virginia
- Coordinates: 38°23′0.6″N 81°50′3.4″W
- Area: less than one acre
- Built: 1917
- Architectural style: Classical Revival, Colonial Revival
- NRHP reference No.: 04000309
- Added to NRHP: April 14, 2004

James Weimer House is a historic home located at St. Albans, Kanawha County, West Virginia. It was built in 1917, and is a 2 1/2-story, brick dwelling with Classical Revival and Colonial Revival style detailing. It has a gambrel roof with original red clay tiles and dormers. It features a one-story porch running the width of the house and continuing a short distance along the side. Also on the property is a contributing brick garage.

It was listed on the National Register of Historic Places in 2004.
