= Smith-Giltinan House =

Historic house in West Virginia, United States

- U.S. National Register of Historic Places
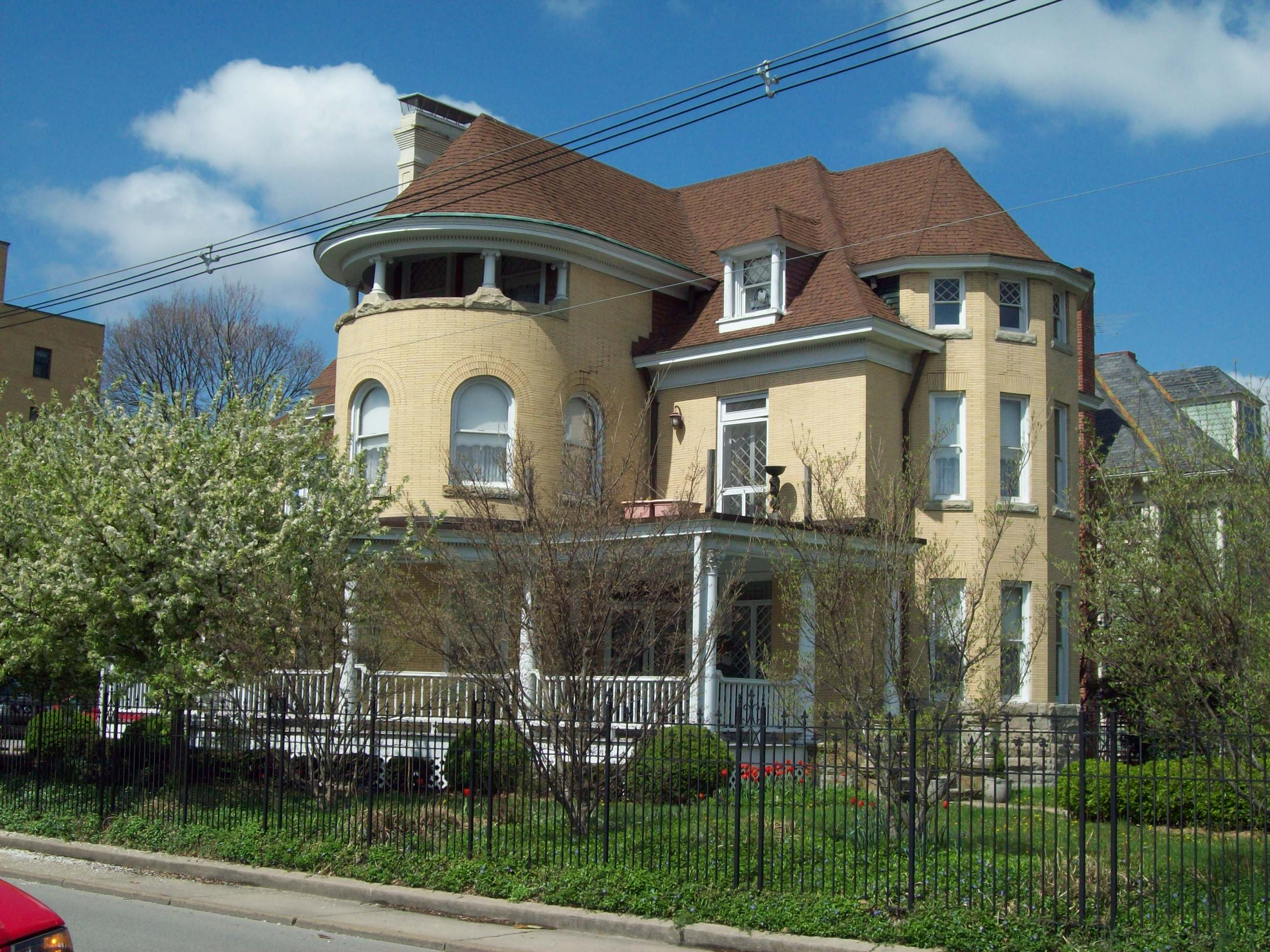
- Smith-Giltinan House, April 2009

- Location within West Virginia Location within the United States
- Location: 1223 Virginia St., E, Charleston, West Virginia
- Coordinates: 38°20′39″N 81°37′51″W
- Built: 1888
- Architectural style: Queen Anne
- NRHP reference No.: 02000253
- Added to NRHP: March 20, 2002

Smith-Giltinan House is a historic home located at Charleston, West Virginia. It is a three-story dwelling with an asymmetrical plan. It was built about 1888 and many of its details are in the Queen Anne style. It features an asymmetrical plan, projecting bays, varied materials and textures, and elaborate porch details. The house is six bays wide by six bays deep and the roof is basically a steeply pitched hip shape, covered with asphalt shingles. There is a polygonal tower on the north side.

It was listed on the National Register of Historic Places in 2002.
