= Plaza Theatre (Charleston, West Virginia) =

- West Virginia State University Capitol Complex Theatre
- U.S. National Register of Historic Places
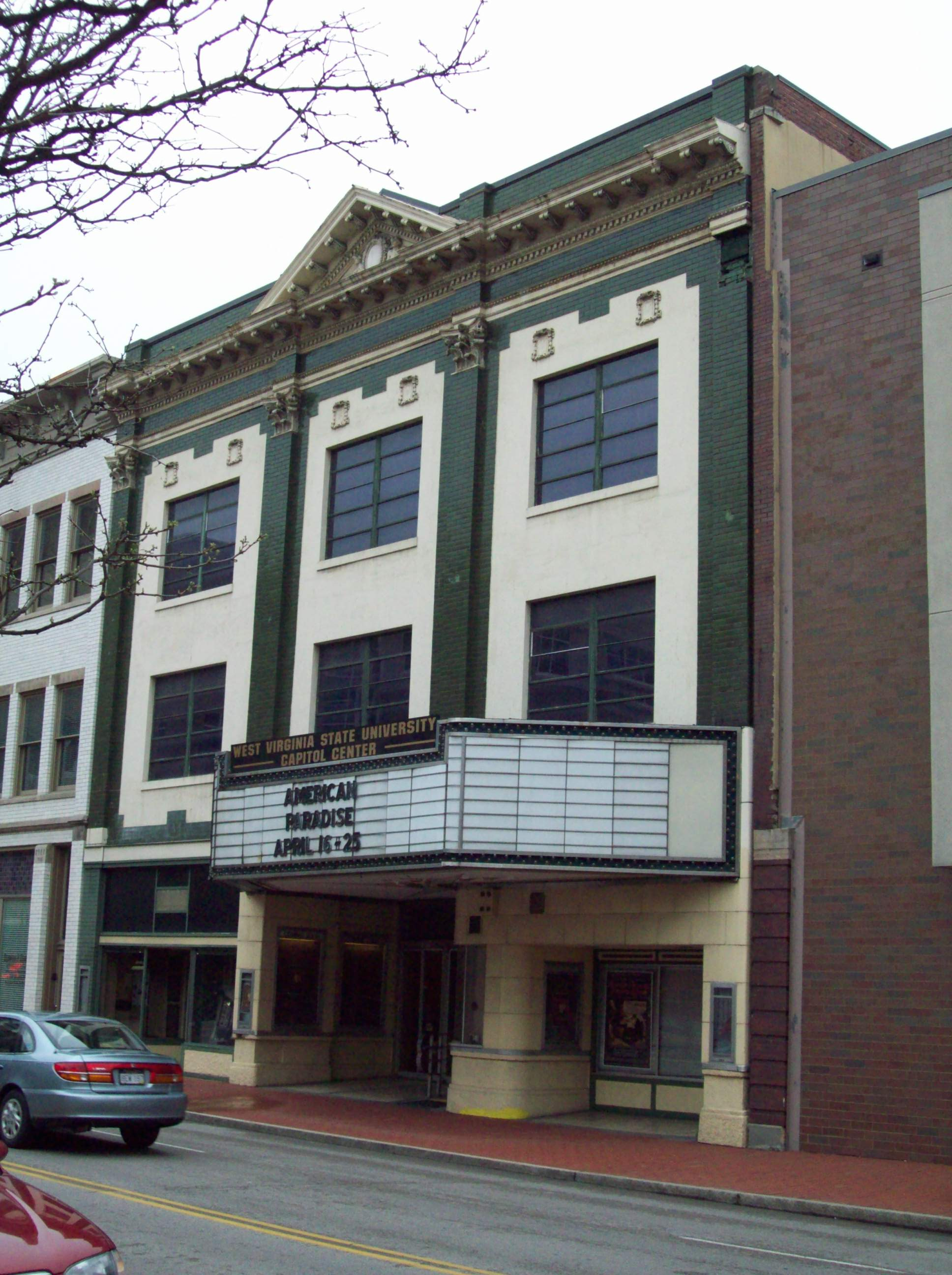
- Plaza Theatre, Charleston, WV, April 2009

- Location within West Virginia Location within the United States
- Location: 123 Summers St., Charleston, West Virginia
- Coordinates: 38°21′0″N 81°38′8″W
- Built: 1912
- Architect: Wiggins, P. Norwood
- Architectural style: Classical Revival
- NRHP reference No.: 85003408
- Added to NRHP: October 30, 1985

Plaza Theatre, also known as the Capitol Theater or West Virginia State University Capitol Center, is a historic theatre building located at Charleston, West Virginia. It was constructed about 1912 and is a turn-of-the-century theater/commercial/office building located in a transitional business district of downtown Charleston. The three-story brick structure is characterized by eclectic Classical Revival style architecture incorporating a number of elements from classical Greek forms. The theater's streetfront entrance is flanked by two commercial storefronts. The dimensions of the Capitol Theater building are 53 feet wide by 163 feet deep (16 by 50 m).

It was listed on the National Register of Historic Places in 1985.
