= The Beeches (St. Albans, West Virginia) =

Historic house in West Virginia, United States

- U.S. National Register of Historic Places
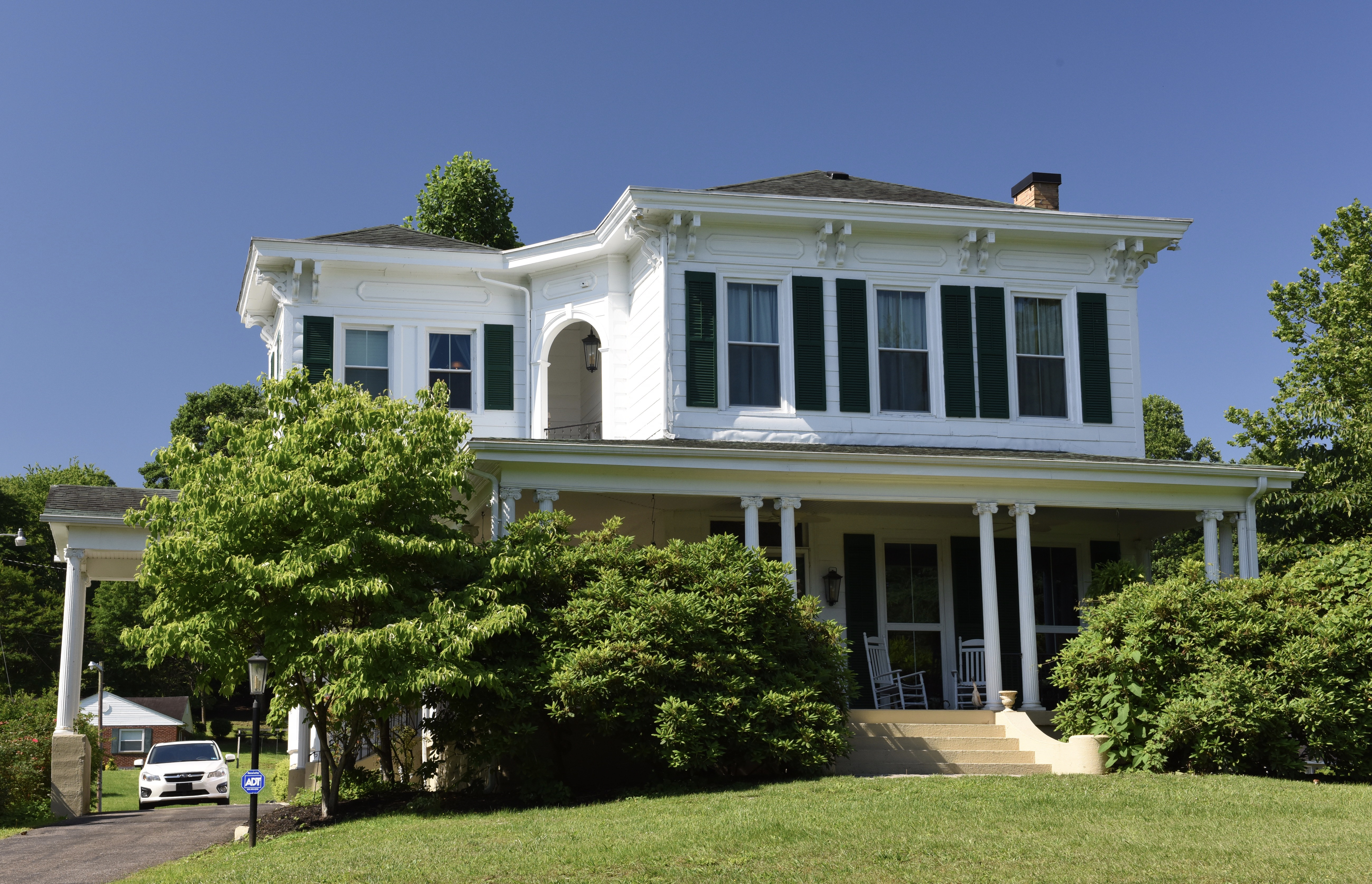

- Location within West Virginia Location within the United States
- Location: 805 Kanawha Ter., St. Albans, West Virginia
- Coordinates: 38°22′55″N 81°49′49″W
- Built: ca. 1874
- Architectural style: Italianate
- NRHP reference No.: 79002586
- Added to NRHP: April 20, 1979

The Beeches, also known as the Huntington-Skinner House and Woman's Club of St. Albans, is a historic home located at St. Albans, West Virginia. It was built about 1874 for Henry Edwards Huntington in the Italianate style. After its purchase in 1903 by locale magnate J. V. R. Skinner, the two story home was transformed with a mix of formal interior and exterior details and additions. It commands an excellent view of Kanawha Terrace, a principal street of St. Albans, atop a hill that descends in a gentle slope shaded with trees and shrubbery.

It was listed on the National Register of Historic Places in 1979.
