= W.E. Chilton II House =

Historic house in West Virginia, United States

- W. E. Chilton II House
- U.S. National Register of Historic Places
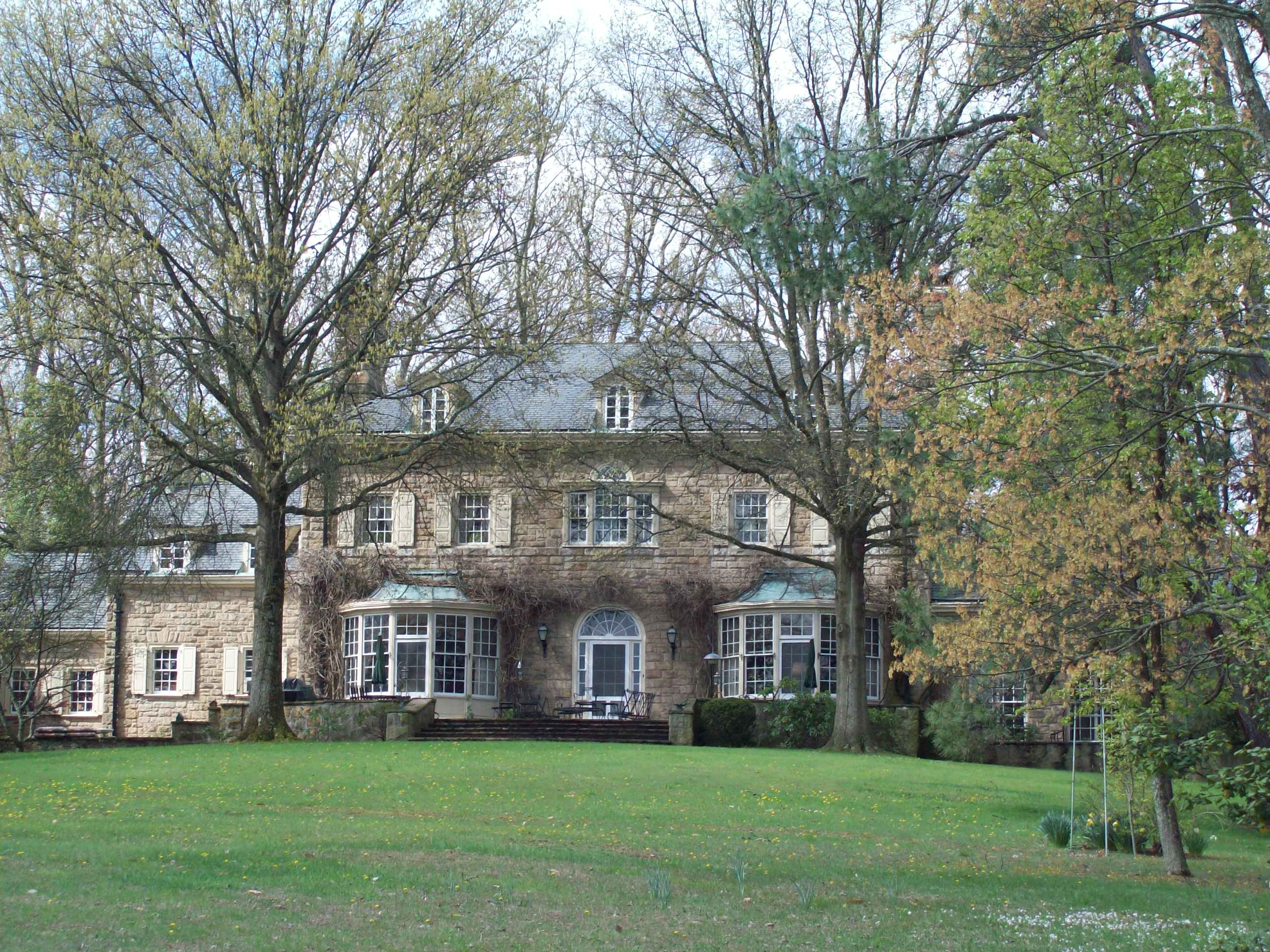
- Chilton House, April 2009

- Location within West Virginia Location within the United States
- Location: 1266 Louden Heights Rd., Charleston, West Virginia
- Coordinates: 38°19′57″N 81°38′40″W
- Area: 3.6 acres (1.5 ha)
- Built: 1933
- Architect: Bottomley, William L.
- Architectural style: Colonial Revival, Neo-Georgian Revival
- MPS: South Hills MRA
- NRHP reference No.: 84000397
- Added to NRHP: October 26, 1984

W. E. Chilton II House is a historic home located at Charleston, West Virginia. It is a neo-Georgian stone house designed by nationally known architect William Lawrence Bottomley and built in 1933, for W. E. Chilton II and his wife Nancy Ruffner Chilton. The 2 1/2-story central block of the house is flanked symmetrically by single-story wings. In front of the west facade is a 90 foot by 90 foot walled forecourt paved in flagstone and Belgian block and cobblestones that were originally used on Philadelphia streets.

The house remains a private residence.

It was listed on the National Register of Historic Places in 1984 as part of the South Hills Multiple Resource Area.
