= Bird Haven =

Historic house in West Virginia, United States

- U.S. National Register of Historic Places
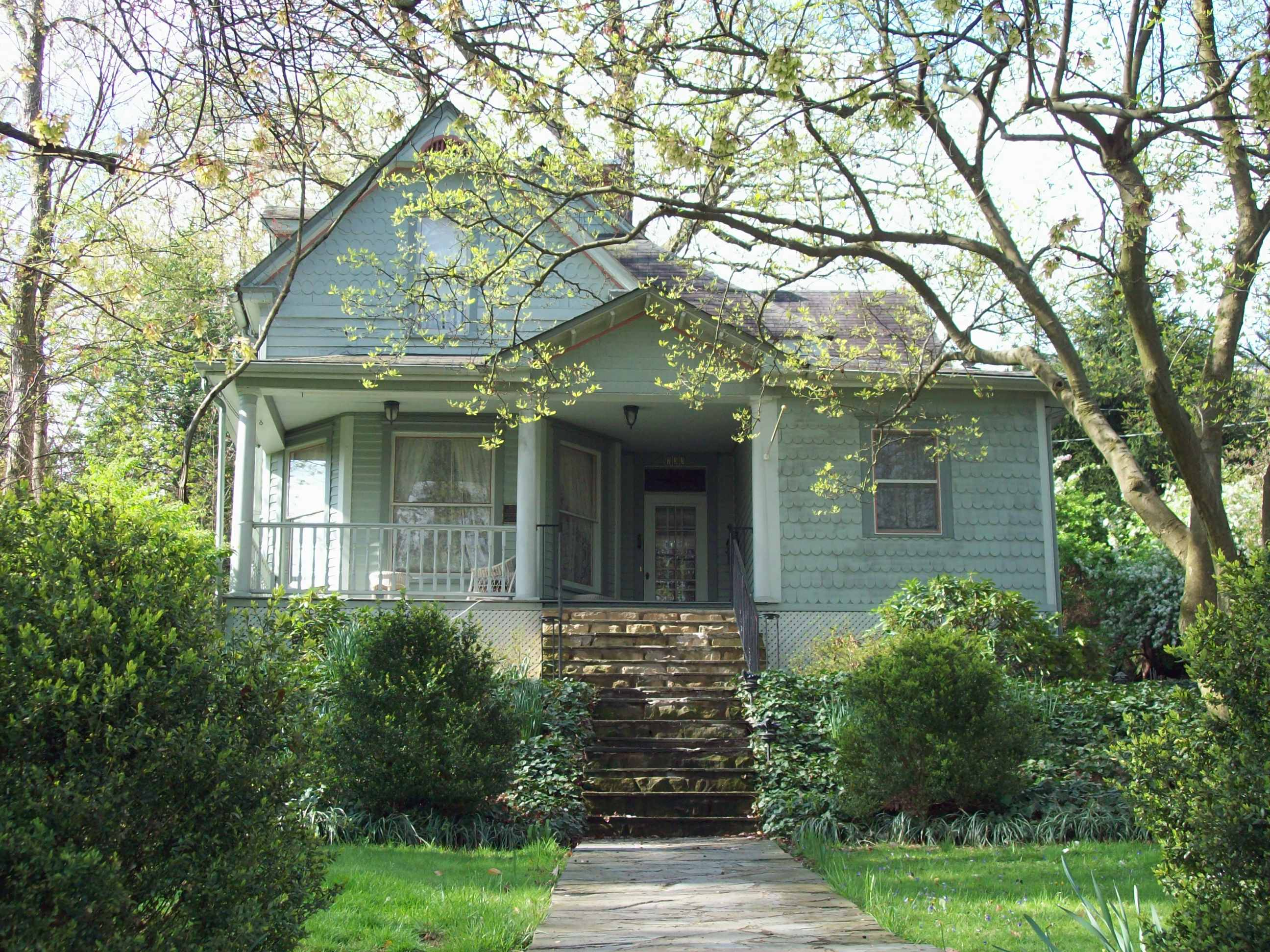
- Bird Haven, April 2009

- Location within West Virginia Location within the United States
- Location: 733 Myrtle Rd., Charleston, West Virginia
- Coordinates: 38°20′12″N 81°38′35″W
- Area: 0.3 acres (0.12 ha)
- Built: 1895
- Architectural style: Bungalow/Craftsman, Late Victorian
- MPS: South Hills MRA
- NRHP reference No.: 84000393
- Added to NRHP: October 26, 1984

Bird Haven is a historic home located at Charleston, West Virginia. It was built about 1895, by Israel N. Johnson, who owned a tailor business and served as state ornithologist for West Virginia. This two-story bungalow-style cottage is of painted clapboards.

It was listed on the National Register of Historic Places in 1984 as part of the South Hills Multiple Resource Area.
