= Woodrums' Building =

- U.S. National Register of Historic Places
- U.S. Historic district – Contributing property
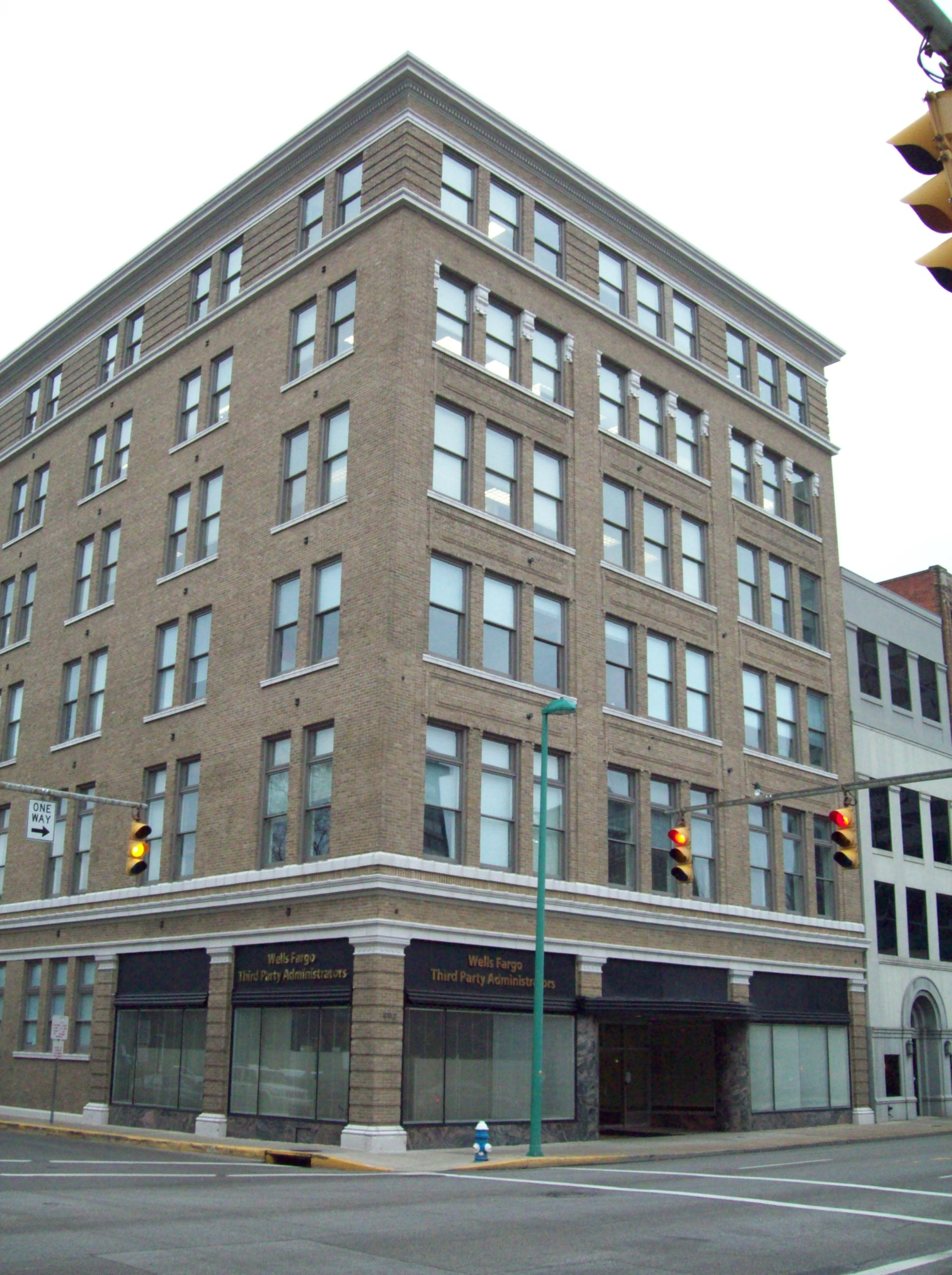
- Woodrums' Building, April 2009

- Location within West Virginia Location within the United States
- Location: 602 E. Virginia St., Charleston, West Virginia
- Coordinates: 38°21′1″N 81°38′15″W
- Built: 1916
- Architect: Agsten, H.B., Sr
- Architectural style: Late 19th And Early 20th Century American Movements, Early Commercial
- NRHP reference No.: 96000439
- Added to NRHP: April 18, 1996

Woodrums' Building, also known as Woodrum Home Outfitting Co. building, is a historic commercial building located at Charleston, West Virginia, United States. It is a six-story commercial building located in the central business district of Charleston. The property consists of an original commercial structure built in 1916 and a rear addition built in 1937.

It was listed on the National Register of Historic Places in 1996. It was also listed as a contributing property in the Downtown Charleston Historic District in 2006.
