= William E. Mohler House =

Historic house in West Virginia, United States

- U.S. National Register of Historic Places
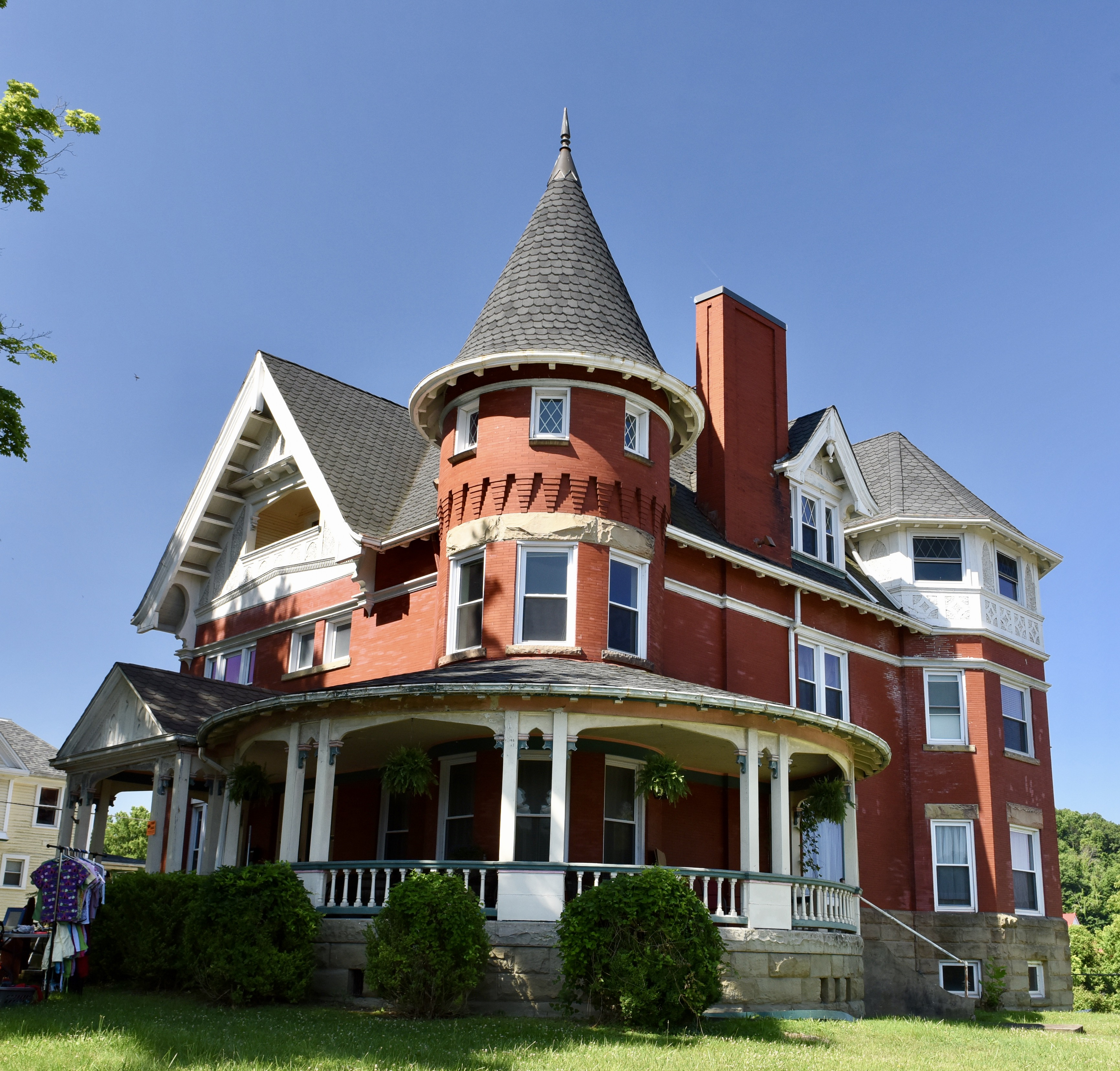

- Location within West Virginia Location within the United States
- Location: 819 Pennsylvania Ave., St. Albans, West Virginia
- Coordinates: 38°23′7″N 81°50′12″W
- Area: less than one acre
- Built: c. 1900
- Architectural style: Queen Anne
- NRHP reference No.: 83003242
- Added to NRHP: February 10, 1983

William E. Mohler House, also known as "Hill Grove", is a historic home located at St. Albans, Kanawha County, West Virginia. It was built about 1900, and is a 2 1/2-story, frame rectangular dwelling with a corner tower in the Queen Anne style. It sits on a stone foundation. It has a complex roof of multiple gables, with four colossal paneled brick chimneys. The upper most floor houses a ballroom. It was built by William E. Mohler, president of the area's largest lumber company. The property was sold for use as a church in 1965, and occupied by Covenant Presbyterian Church when listed in 1983. In 1992, Covenant Presbyterian Church moved to Nitro, West Virginia.

It was listed on the National Register of Historic Places in 1983.
