= St. Mark's Episcopal Church (St. Albans, West Virginia) =

Historic church in West Virginia, United States

- U.S. National Register of Historic Places
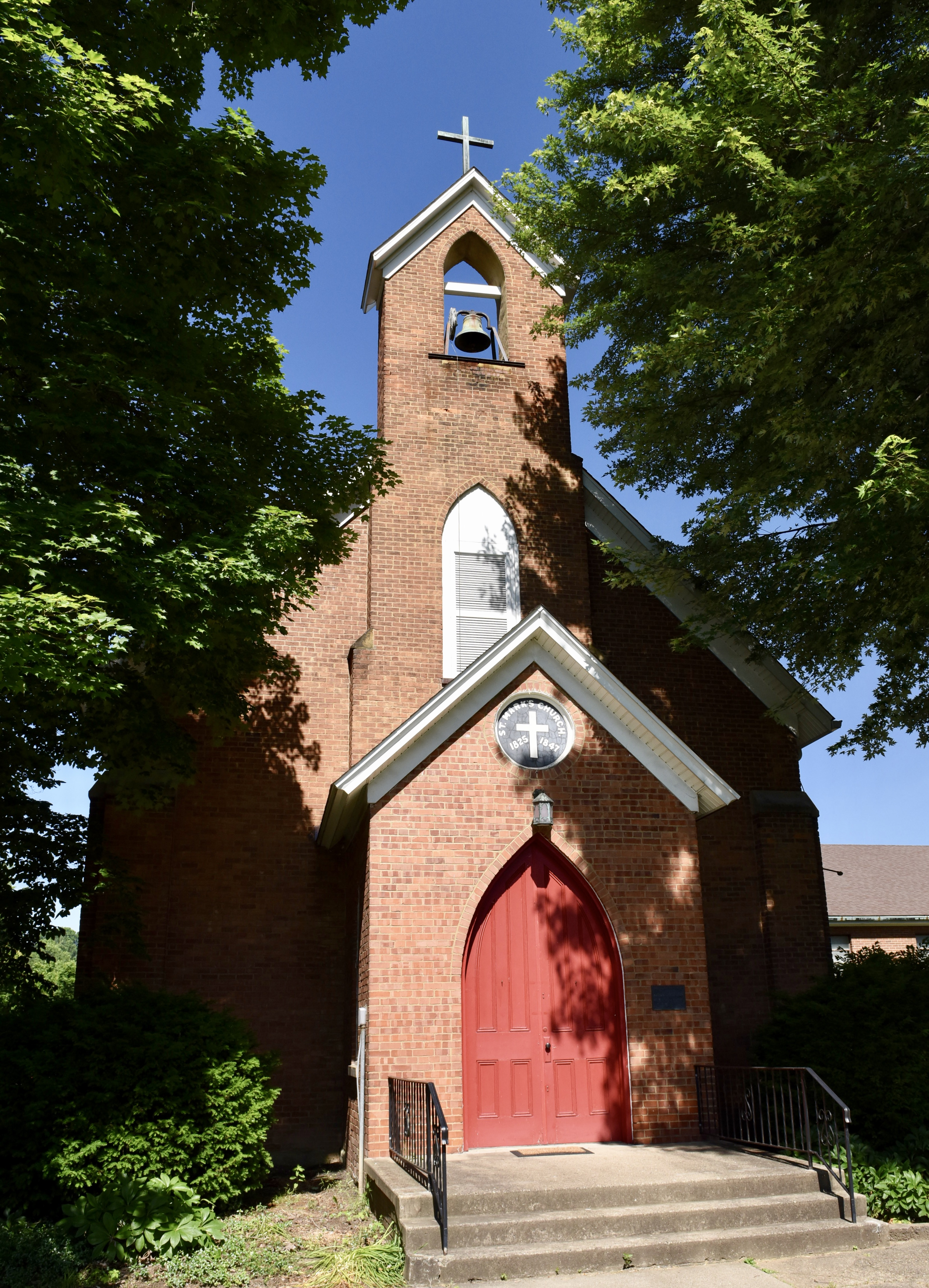

- Location within West Virginia Location within the United States
- Location: 405--407 B St. St. Albans, West Virginia
- Coordinates: 38°23′18″N 81°50′19″W
- Area: 1.5 acres (0.61 ha)
- Built: 1847
- Architectural style: Gothic Revival
- NRHP reference No.: 77001377
- Added to NRHP: November 7, 1977

St. Mark's Episcopal Church, also known as Bangor Parish, is a historic Episcopal church at 405-407 B Street in St. Albans, Kanawha County, West Virginia, USA. It was built in 1847, and is a one-story brick building in the Gothic Revival style. The church has a rectangular floor plan with a front vestibule and entrance through a central tower. It was listed on the National Register of Historic Places in 1977.

The congregation is part of the Episcopal Diocese of West Virginia.

In 2016, the church reported 144 members; in 2023, it reported 167 members. No membership statistics were reported in 2024 national parochial reports. Plate and pledge financial support reported by the church in 2024 was $102,847. Average Sunday Attendance (ASA) reported in 2024 was 29 persons. This was a relative decrease from ASA of 53 reported in 2019.

== History ==
During the American Civil War, the building and surrounding property were occupied by Union forces. They burned the parsonage and damaged the interior of the church. After the war the building had to be closed for a period of time while only temporary repairs were made. The Federal government paid restitution for the damages in 1915, and the building was restored to good condition.
