= Kearse Theater =

- U.S. National Register of Historic Places
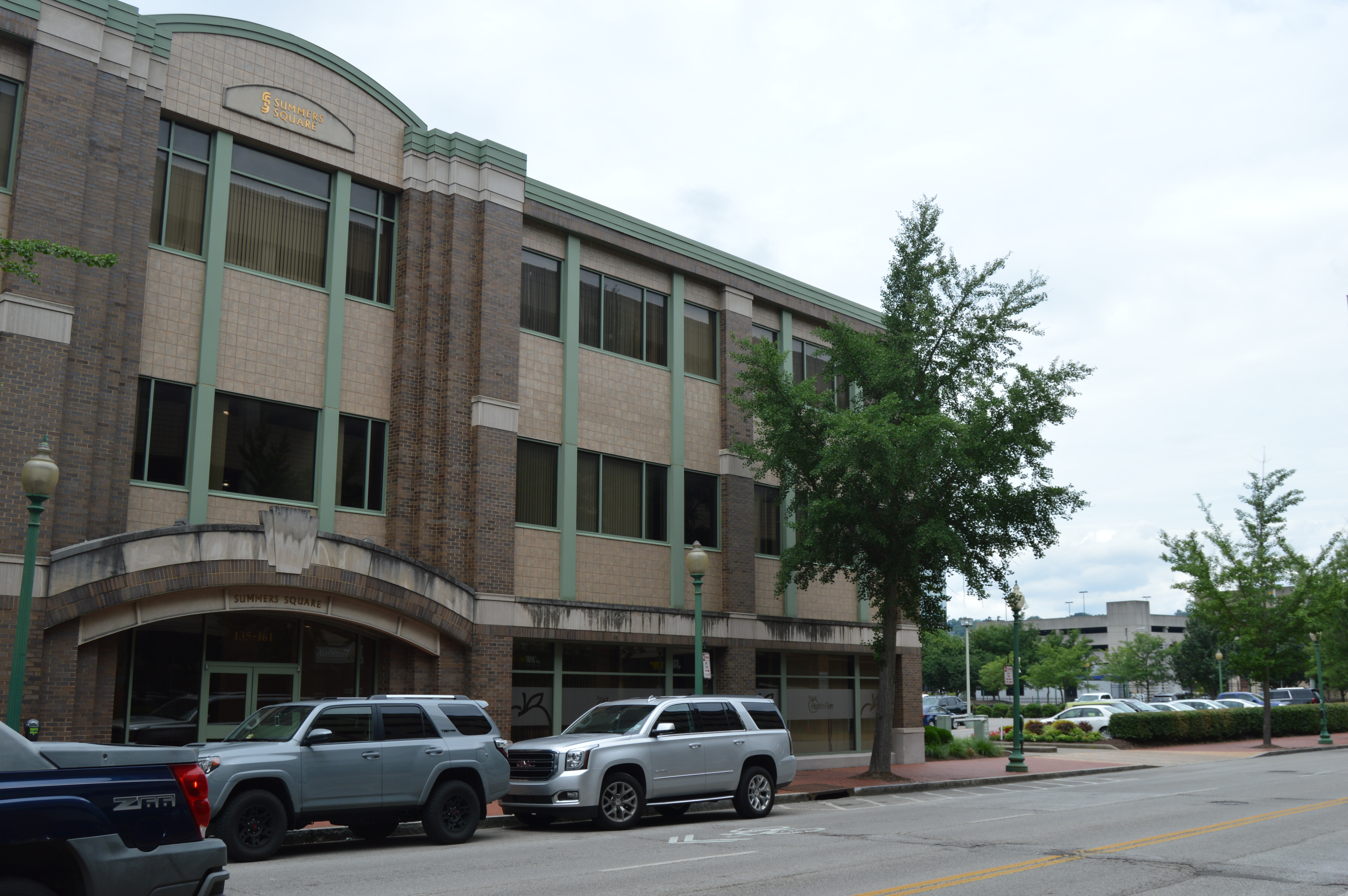
- Site of the theater

- Location within West Virginia Location within the United States
- Location: 161, 165, and 167 Summers St., Charleston, West Virginia
- Coordinates: 38°21′4″N 81°38′7″W
- Built: 1921
- Architect: Mills & Millspaugh Co.
- Demolished: 1982
- NRHP reference No.: 80004026
- Added to NRHP: November 28, 1980

Kearse Theater was a historic theatre building located at Charleston, West Virginia. It was constructed in 1921 and composed of a single floor auditorium with balcony behind a three-story front section which included two storefronts. It was designed for stage shows as well as for movies. The theater was demolished in 1982.

It was listed on the National Register of Historic Places in 1980.
