= Bougemont Complex =

Historic house in West Virginia, United States

- Bougemont
- U.S. National Register of Historic Places
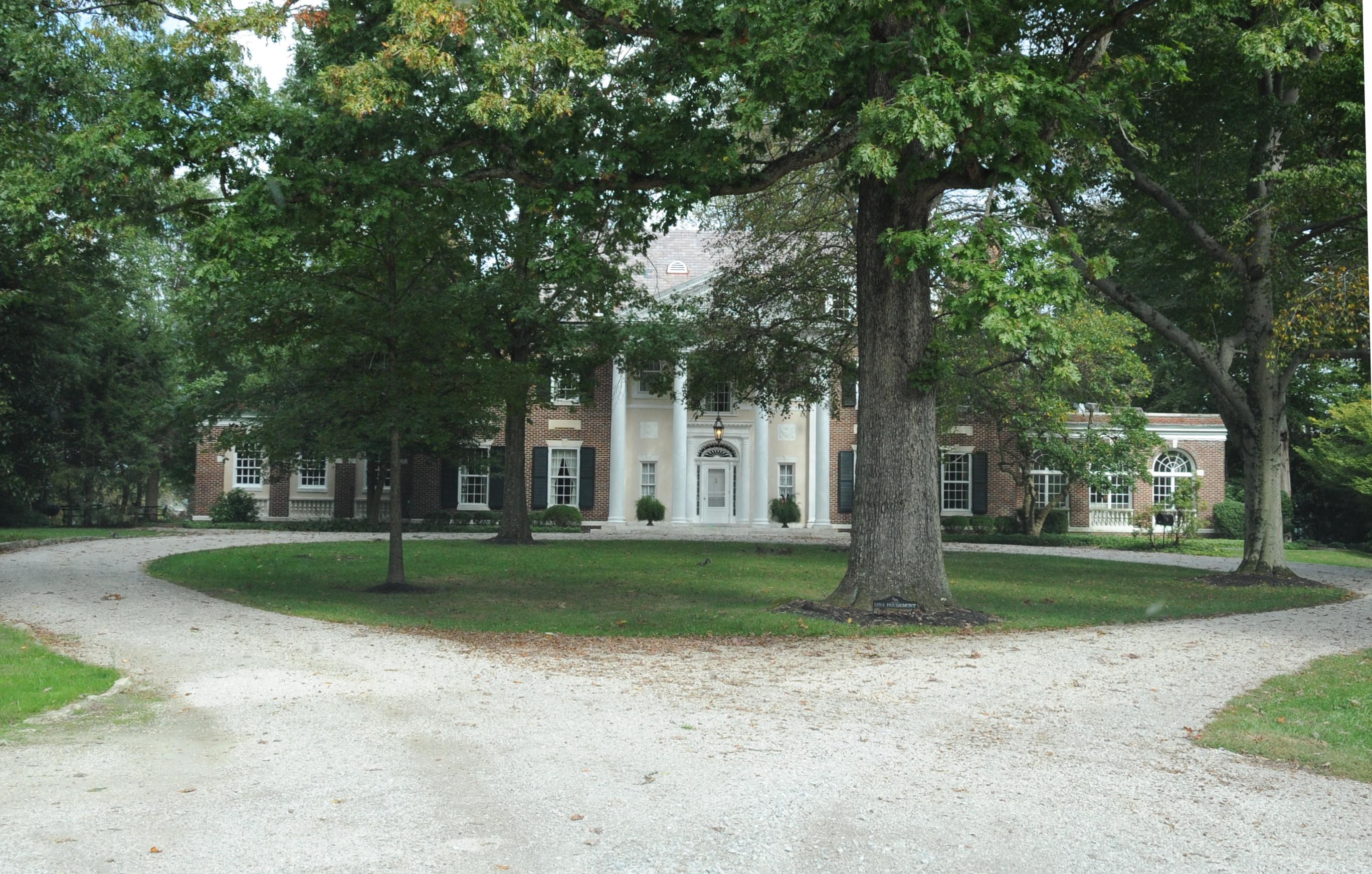

- Location within West Virginia Location within the United States
- Location: Bougemont Dr., Charleston, West Virginia
- Coordinates: 38°20′25″N 81°38′3″W
- Area: 8 acres (3.2 ha)
- Built: 1916
- Architect: Ford, Butler & Oliver
- Architectural style: Colonial Revival, Georgian Revival
- MPS: South Hills MRA
- NRHP reference No.: 84000395
- Added to NRHP: October 26, 1984

Bougemont is a historic home located at Charleston, West Virginia. It was the home of two prominent families in Charleston's business development. It was built about 1916 by Harrison Brooks Smith, an attorney, who served as president of Kanawha Banking and Trust and various companies in Kanawha County. Smith died in 1942, and in 1959, Horace Hamilton Smallridge, another leading Charleston businessman, purchased the property. Bougemont is symmetrically arranged with a 2 1/2-story central block and two single-story side wings. The entrance facade features a pedimented portico with Corinthian columns. Also on the property are a cottage, stable, and barn.

The house and its outbuildings remain a private residence.

It was listed on the National Register of Historic Places in 1984 as part of the South Hills Multiple Resource Area.
