= Summers House =

Historic house in West Virginia, United States

- U.S. National Register of Historic Places
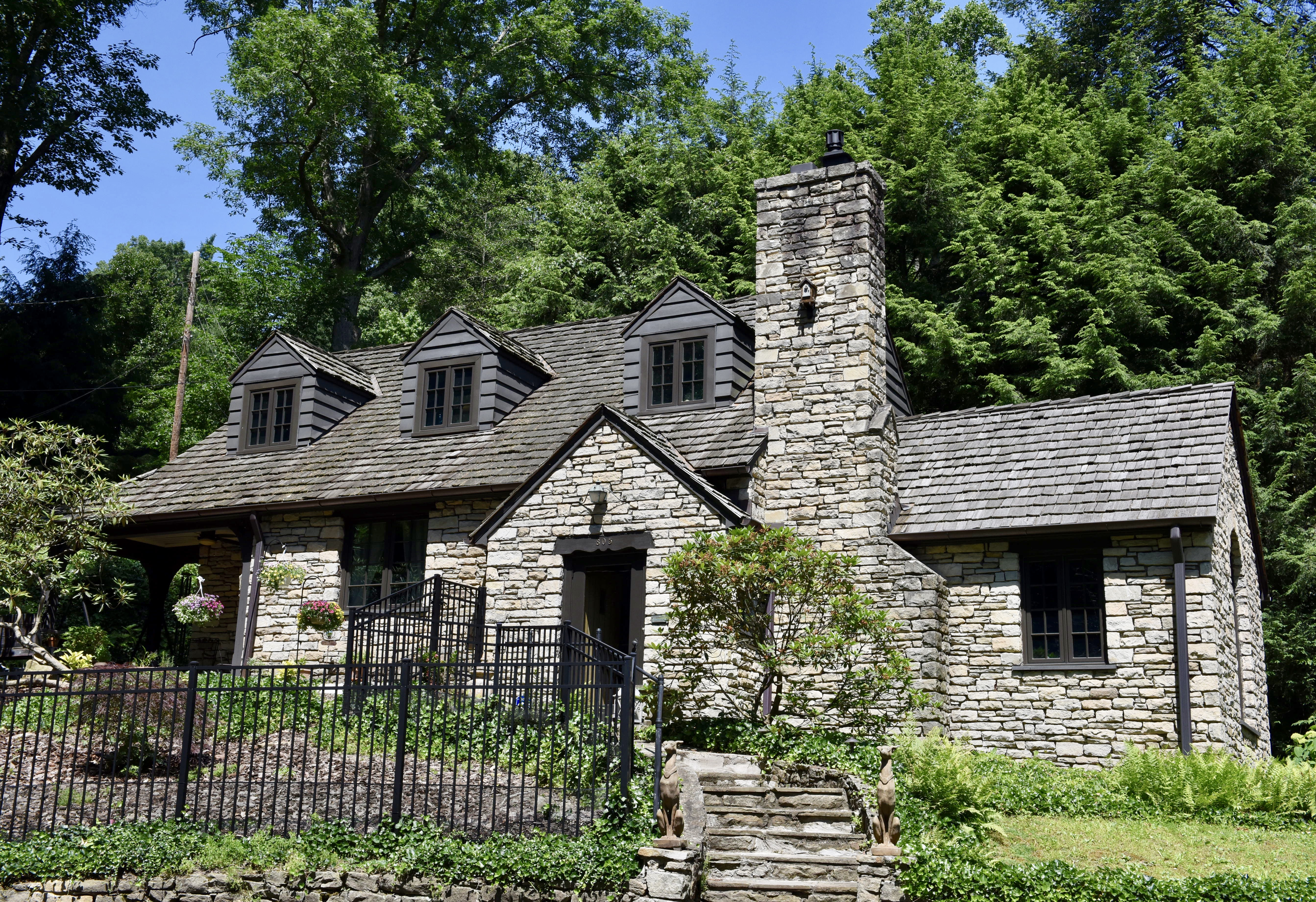

- Location within West Virginia Location within the United States
- Location: 805 Loudon Heights Rd., Charleston, West Virginia
- Coordinates: 38°20′25″N 81°38′14″W
- Built: c. 1939
- Architect: Charles A. Haviland
- Architectural style: Tudor Revival
- NRHP reference No.: 15000841
- Added to NRHP: November 24, 2015

The Summers House is a historic house located at 805 Loudon Heights Road in Charleston, West Virginia. Elizabeth and Okey Summers had the house built circa 1939; Elizabeth was active in theater, while Okey was a prominent local banker. The house was part of Charleston's upper-class South Hills neighborhood, and its site was a former stone quarry that was solid rock prior to the house's construction; the sandstone from the quarry was used as the house's building material. Architect Charles A. Havilant, a prolific local architect responsible for many of the city's homes and civic institutions, designed the Tudor Revival home. The house lacks many of the typical characteristics of Tudor architecture, such as a steep roof and half-timbering, due to Elizabeth's preference and the limitations of the site; its prominent features include tall chimneys, casement windows with diamond-shaped leaded glass panels, and a cathedral ceiling.

The house was added to the National Register of Historic Places on November 24, 2015.
