= Hansford, West Virginia =

- Unincorporated community
- Location within West Virginia and the United States Hansford (the United States)
- Coordinates: 38°12′14″N 81°23′44″W
- Country: United States
- State: West Virginia
- County: Kanawha
- Elevation: 623 ft (190 m)
- Time zone: UTC-5 (Eastern (EST))
  - Summer (DST): UTC-4 (EDT)
- ZIP code: 25103
- Area codes: 304 & 681
- GNIS feature ID: 1539924

Hansford is an unincorporated community in Kanawha County, West Virginia, United States. Hansford is located along the Kanawha River and West Virginia Route 61, adjacent to Pratt. Hansford has a post office with ZIP code 25103.

== History ==
The Hansford post office was originally named Paintcreek. Paintcreek was the original name of the community now called Hansford. The present name most likely came from a local family named Hansford.
