= Sterrett Brothers' Dry Goods Store =

- U.S. National Register of Historic Places
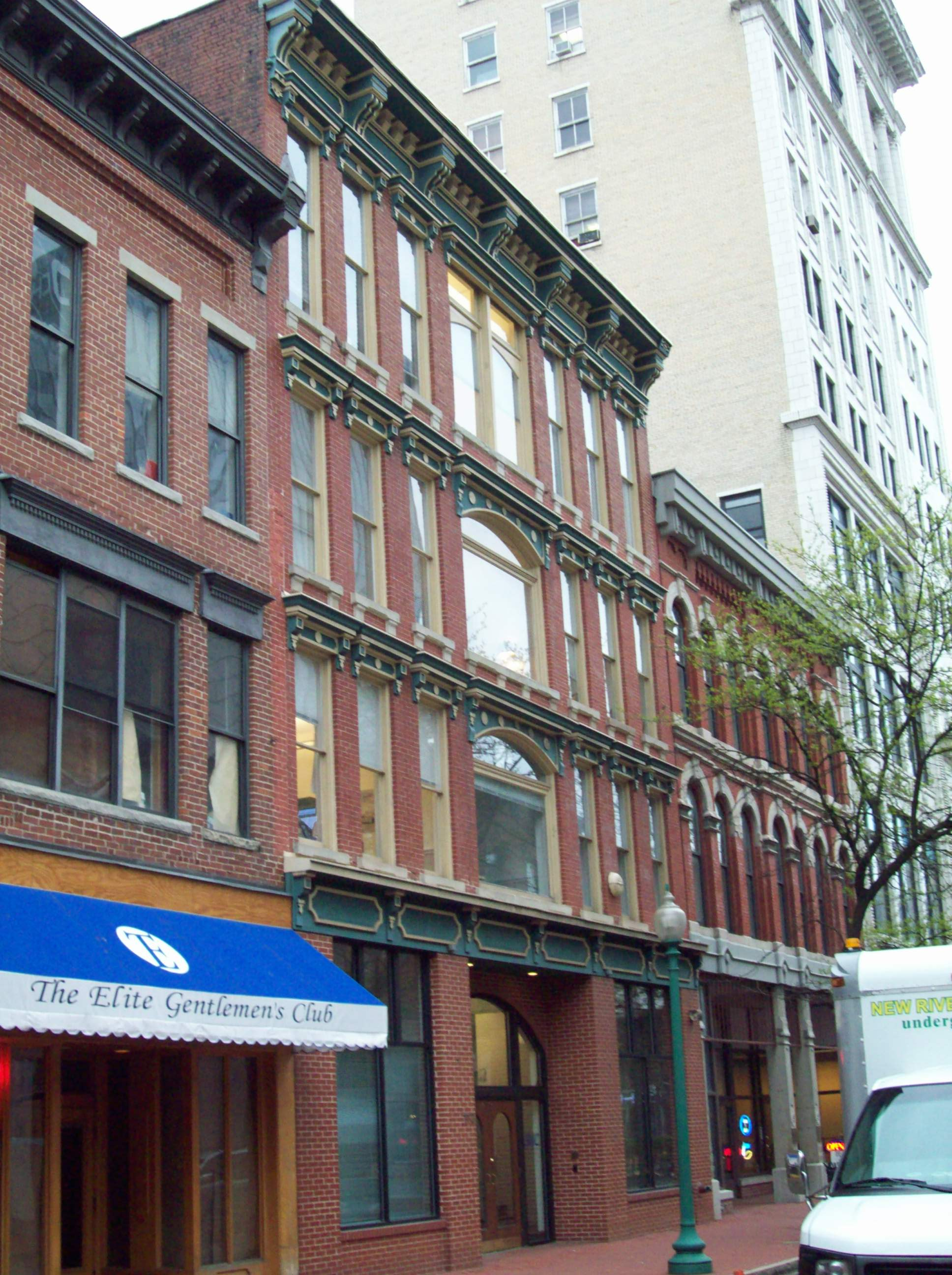
- Sterrett Brothers' Dry Goods Store, April 2009

- Location within West Virginia Location within the United States
- Location: 112 Capitol St., Charleston, West Virginia
- Coordinates: 38°20′58″N 81°38′8″W
- Built: 1890
- Architectural style: Italianate
- NRHP reference No.: 01001329
- Added to NRHP: November 29, 2001

Sterrett Brothers' Dry Goods Store is a historic commercial structure located at Charleston, West Virginia. It was built about 1890 in what has become known as the "Victorian Block" of Charleston. The building originally had three floors with a storefront on the first floor. Sometime after 1898, but before 1917, a fourth story was added to the building. Since its construction by the Sterrett Brothers, it has been occupied by Sacks Shoe Store, J.C. Penney Company, the Dondale Furniture Company, and most recently a Charleston-based Law firm.

It was listed on the National Register of Historic Places in 2001.
