= Maple Terrace Court and Walton Apartments =

Historic residential buildings in West Virginia, United States

- U.S. National Register of Historic Places
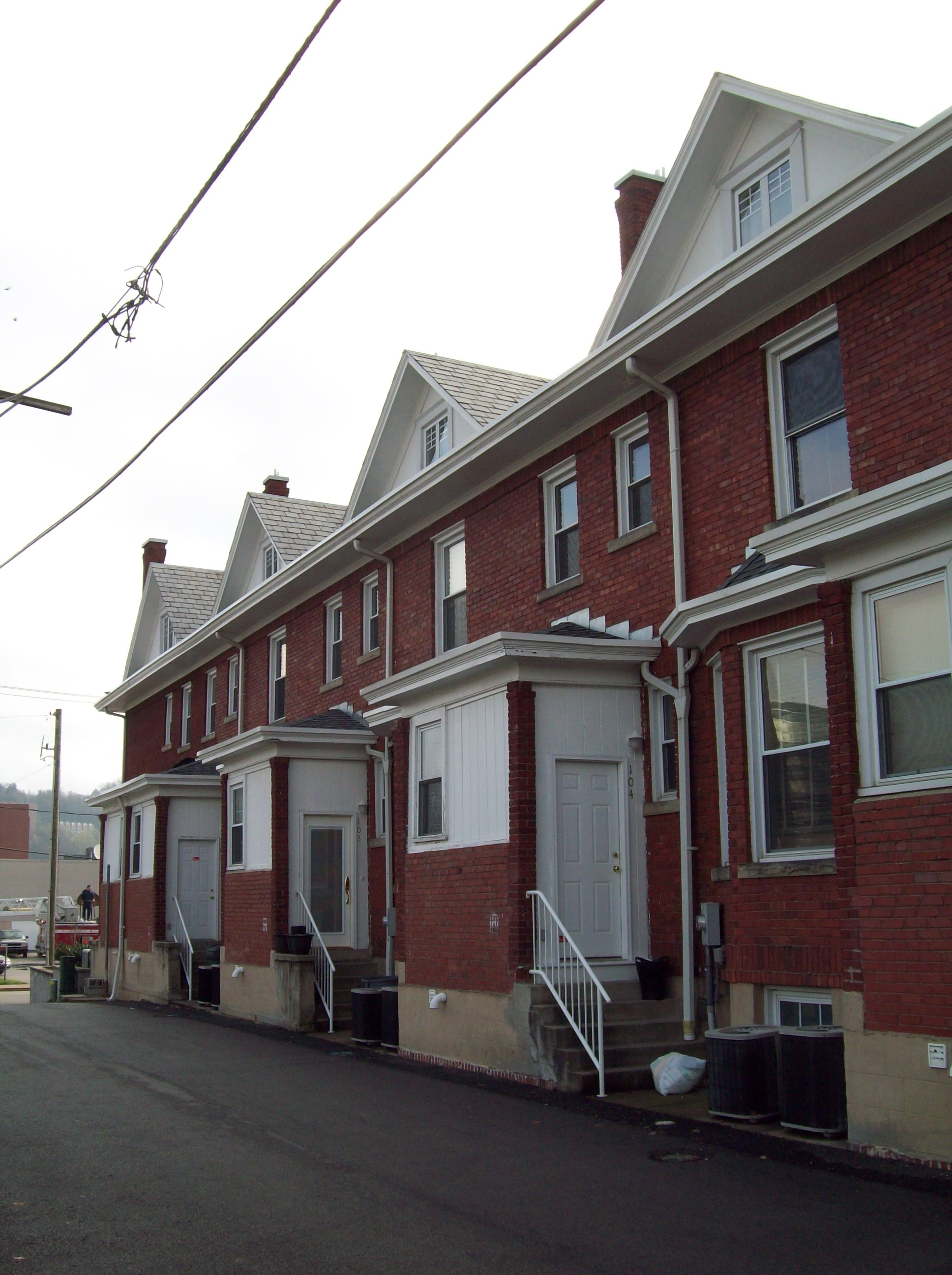
- Maple Terrace Court (rear view), April 2009

- Location within West Virginia Location within the United States
- Location: Maple Terrace Court, Charleston, West Virginia
- Coordinates: 38°20′42″N 81°37′39″W
- Built: 1914
- Architectural style: Colonial Revival
- NRHP reference No.: 02000885
- Added to NRHP: August 22, 2002

Maple Terrace Court and Walton Apartments is a group of historic dwellings located at Charleston, West Virginia. Maple Terrace Court is a row of 2 1/2-story brick urban townhouses built in 1914 in the Colonial Revival-style with each two-bay residential units featuring slate-shingled gable roofs with gabled dormers, concrete foundations scored to resemble cut stone, and brick front porches. The Walton Apartments is a three-story unadorned brick apartment building is of utilitarian construction originally built with four one-bedroom residential units per floor.

It was listed on the National Register of Historic Places in 2002.
