= McAndrews-Gallaher House =

Historic house in West Virginia, United States

- U.S. National Register of Historic Places
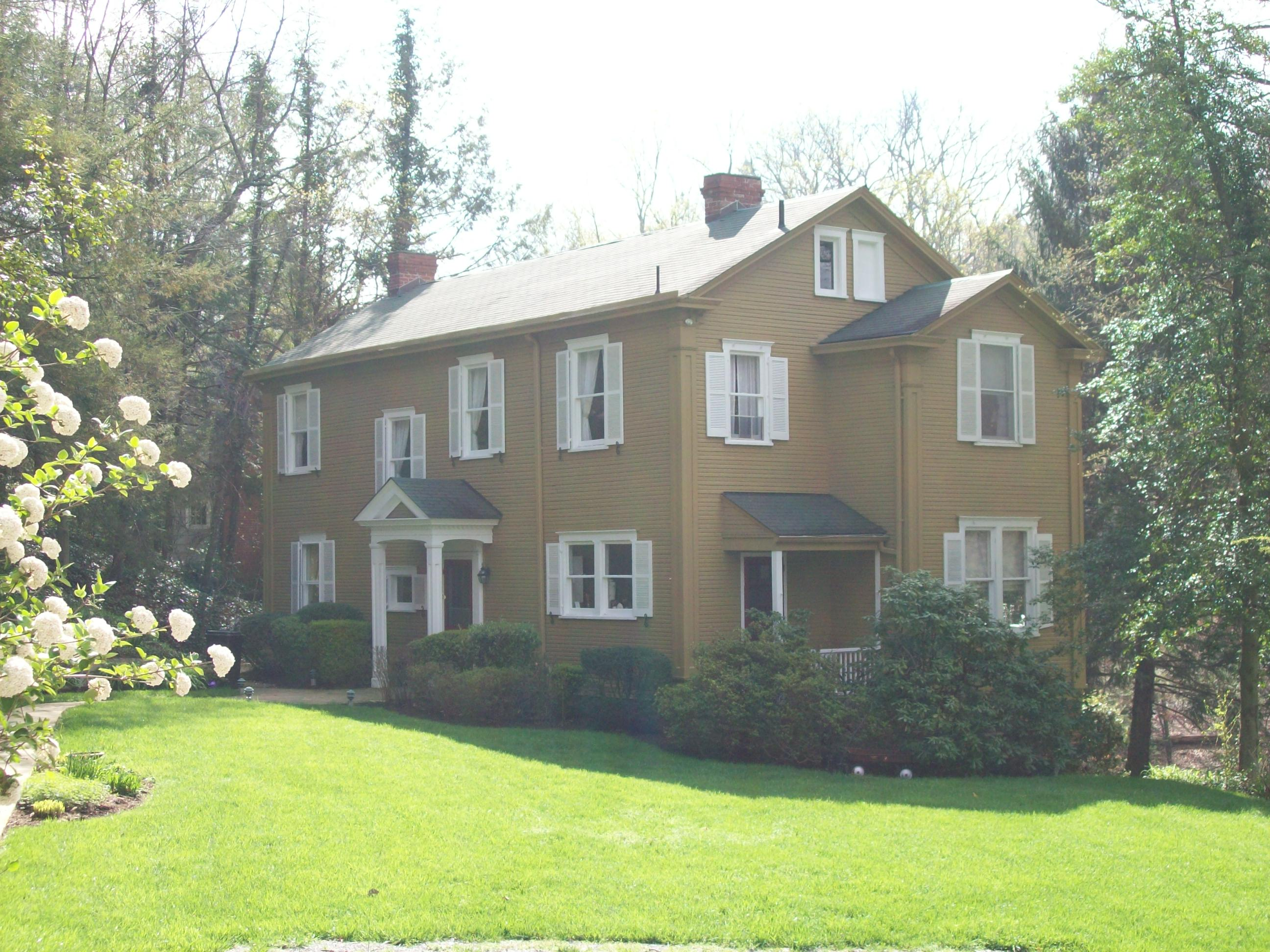
- McAndrews-Gallaher House, April 2009

- Location within West Virginia Location within the United States
- Location: 601 Briarwood Rd., Charleston, West Virginia
- Coordinates: 38°20′46″N 81°38′52″W
- Area: 1 acre (0.40 ha)
- Built: 1914
- Architectural style: Late Victorian
- MPS: South Hills MRA
- NRHP reference No.: 84000409
- Added to NRHP: October 26, 1984

McAndrews-Gallaher House is a historic home located at Charleston, West Virginia. It was built in 1914 for Frank J. McReynolds, Workers' Compensation Commissioner for West Virginia. It is in the late Victorian farmhouse style.

It was listed on the National Register of Historic Places in 1984 as part of the South Hills Multiple Resource Area.
