= Littlepage Stone Mansion =

Historic house in West Virginia, United States

- U.S. National Register of Historic Places
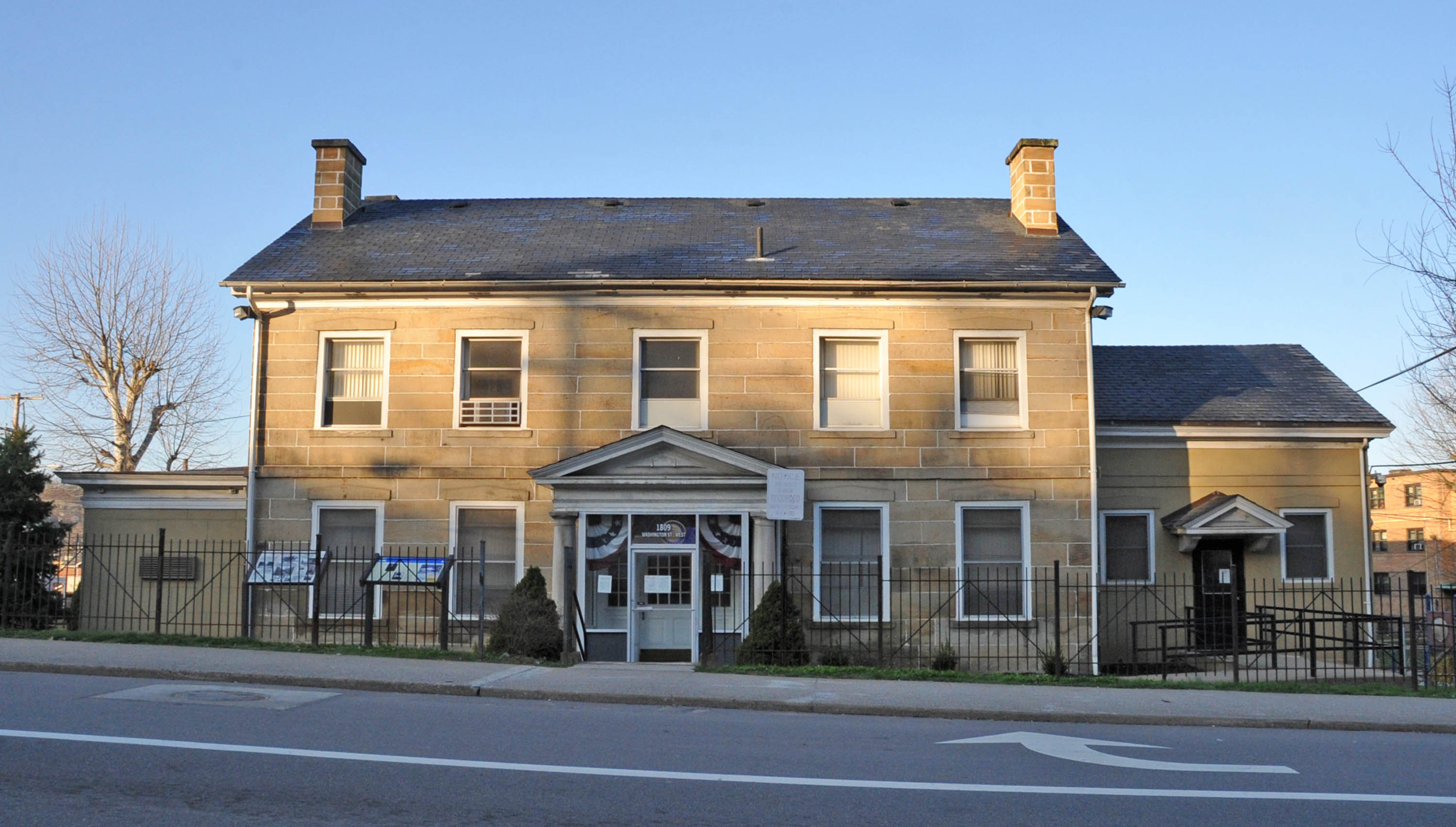

- Location within West Virginia Location within the United States
- Location: 1809 W. Washington St., Charleston, West Virginia
- Coordinates: 38°22′34″N 81°39′58″W
- Built: 1845
- Architect: Joy, Harrop L.; Carson, J.
- Architectural style: Federal
- NRHP reference No.: 82004325
- Added to NRHP: September 02, 1982

Littlepage Stone Mansion, also known as The Old Stone Mansion, is a historic home located at Charleston, West Virginia. It was constructed in 1845 is one of only six houses within the City of Charleston that date to before the American Civil War. It was originally constructed as a two-story Federal style residence, with additions and improvements made in 1915 and 1936.

It was listed on the National Register of Historic Places in 1982.
