= St. Paul Baptist Church (St. Albans, West Virginia) =

Historic church in West Virginia, United States

- U.S. National Register of Historic Places
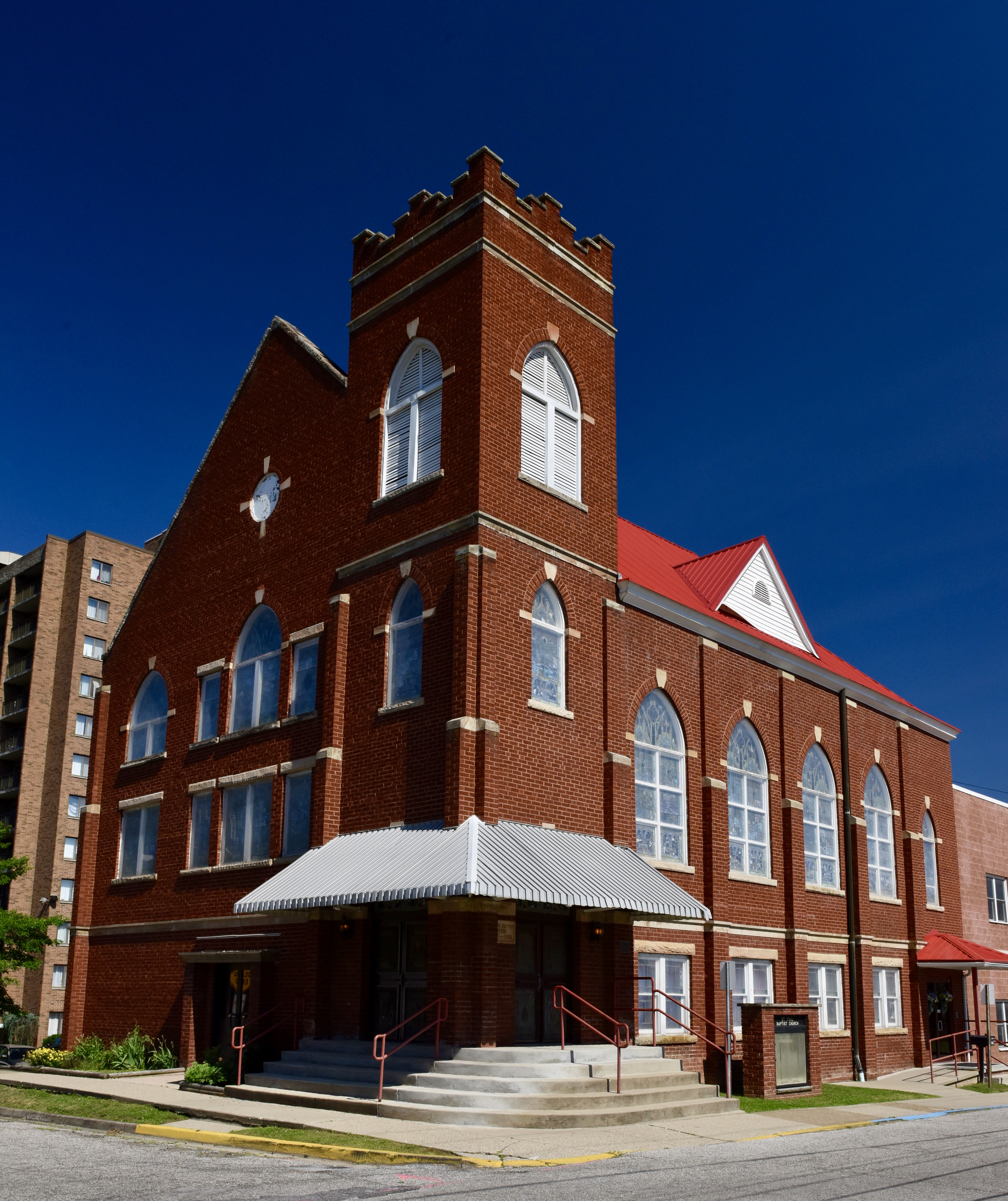

- Location within West Virginia Location within the United States
- Location: 821 B St., St. Albans, West Virginia
- Coordinates: 38°23′4″N 81°50′20″W
- Built: 1921
- Architect: Brown, Albert G.
- Architectural style: Late Gothic Revival
- NRHP reference No.: 98000285
- Added to NRHP: April 13, 1998

St. Paul Baptist Church is a historic Baptist church in St. Albans, West Virginia, United States. It was built in 1921 and is a two-story brick building in the Late Gothic Revival style. It features a square corner tower. It has a ground level fellowship hall and elevated first floor sanctuary. It was built to serve a growing African American population in St. Albans.

It was listed on the National Register of Historic Places in 1998.
