= Danner-Fletcher House =

Historic house in West Virginia, United States

- U.S. National Register of Historic Places
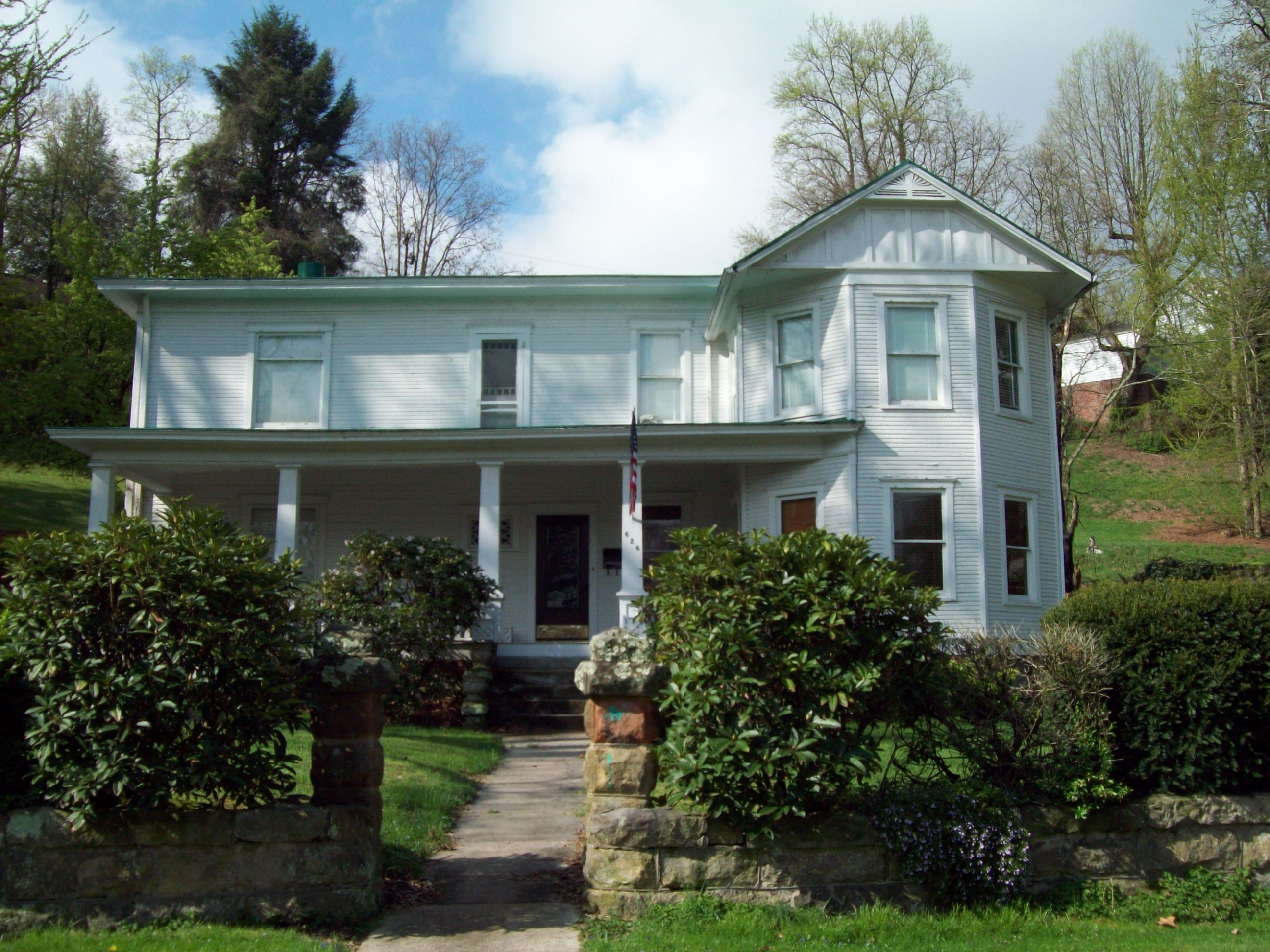
- Danner-Fletcher House, April 2009

- Location within West Virginia Location within the United States
- Location: 626 Holley Rd., Charleston, West Virginia
- Coordinates: 38°20′52″N 81°38′46″W
- Area: 0.5 acres (0.20 ha)
- Built: 1896
- Architectural style: Late Victorian
- MPS: South Hills MRA
- NRHP reference No.: 84000405
- Added to NRHP: October 26, 1984

Danner-Fletcher House is a historic home located at Charleston, West Virginia. It was a farmhouse built for Capt. George Danner (1826–1897) in 1896 in the late Victorian style. It is older than most homes in South Hills and is the only house of this style in the area.

It was listed on the National Register of Historic Places in 1984 as part of the South Hills Multiple Resource Area.
