= Mother Jones Prison =

Historic prison in Kanawha County, West Virginia

- Formerly listed on the U.S. National Register of Historic Places
- Former U.S. National Historic Landmark
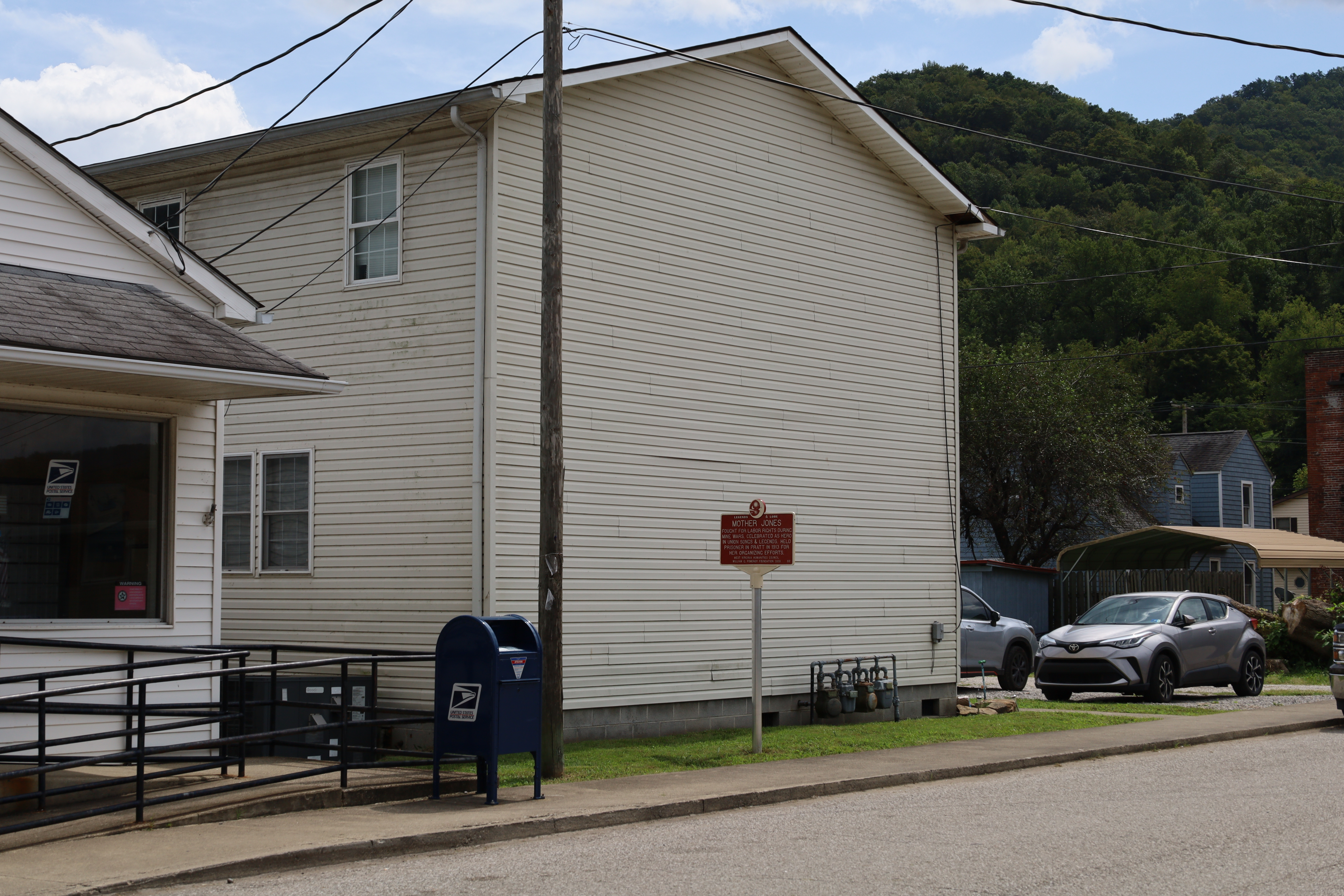
- Sign at the site of the demolished building in 2021

- Location within West Virginia Location within the United States
- Location: 305 Center Street, Pratt, West Virginia
- Coordinates: 38°12′38.1″N 81°23′1.4″W
- NRHP reference No.: 92001876

Significant dates
- Added to NRHP: April 27, 1992
- Removed from NRHP: September 22, 1997

Mother Jones Prison, also known as Mrs. Carney's Boarding House, was located at Pratt, Kanawha County, West Virginia. It was a large two-story structure constructed by the Willis Brothers and used mostly as a boarding house. It was the "prison" in which labor organizer and agitator Mary Harris "Mother" Jones was detained during the 1912–1913 mine wars.

The building was a National Historic Landmark. It was listed on the National Register of Historic Places in 1992. However, it was delisted in 1997 after being demolished in 1996.
