= Downtown Charleston Historic District =

Historic district in West Virginia, United States

- U.S. National Register of Historic Places
- U.S. Historic district
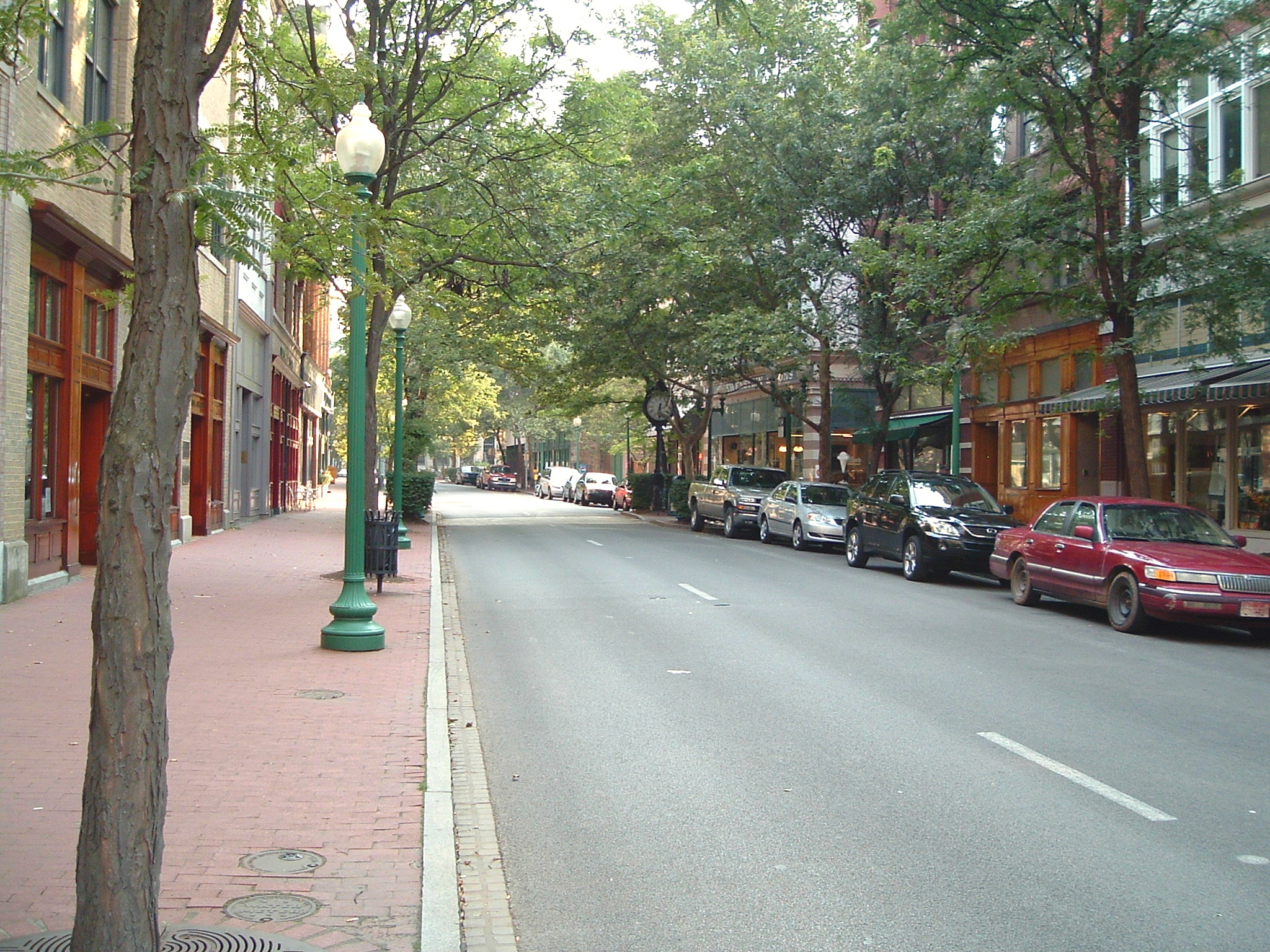
- Capitol Street, Charleston, WV (July 2006)

- Location within West Virginia Location within the United States
- Location: Roughly bounded by Washington St. E, Leon Sullivan Way, Kanawha Blvd. and Summers St., Charleston, West Virginia
- Coordinates: 38°21′2″N 81°38′3″W
- Built: 1877
- Architect: Adkins, John S.; et al.
- Architectural style: Late Victorian, Late 19th And 20th Century Revivals
- NRHP reference No.: 06000166 (original); 100013352 (increase)

Significant dates
- Added to NRHP: March 24, 2006
- Boundary increase: August 31, 2026

Downtown Charleston Historic District is a national historic district located at Charleston, West Virginia, USA. The district contains contributing structures in the Late Victorian and Late 19th and 20th Century Revivals architectural styles. St. John's Episcopal Church (1884), the Basilica of the Co-Cathedral of the Sacred Heart (1897), and Woodrums' Building (1916) are contributing properties.

It was listed on the National Register of Historic Places in 2006.
