= Stoneleigh (Charleston, West Virginia) =

Historic house in West Virginia, United States

- U.S. National Register of Historic Places
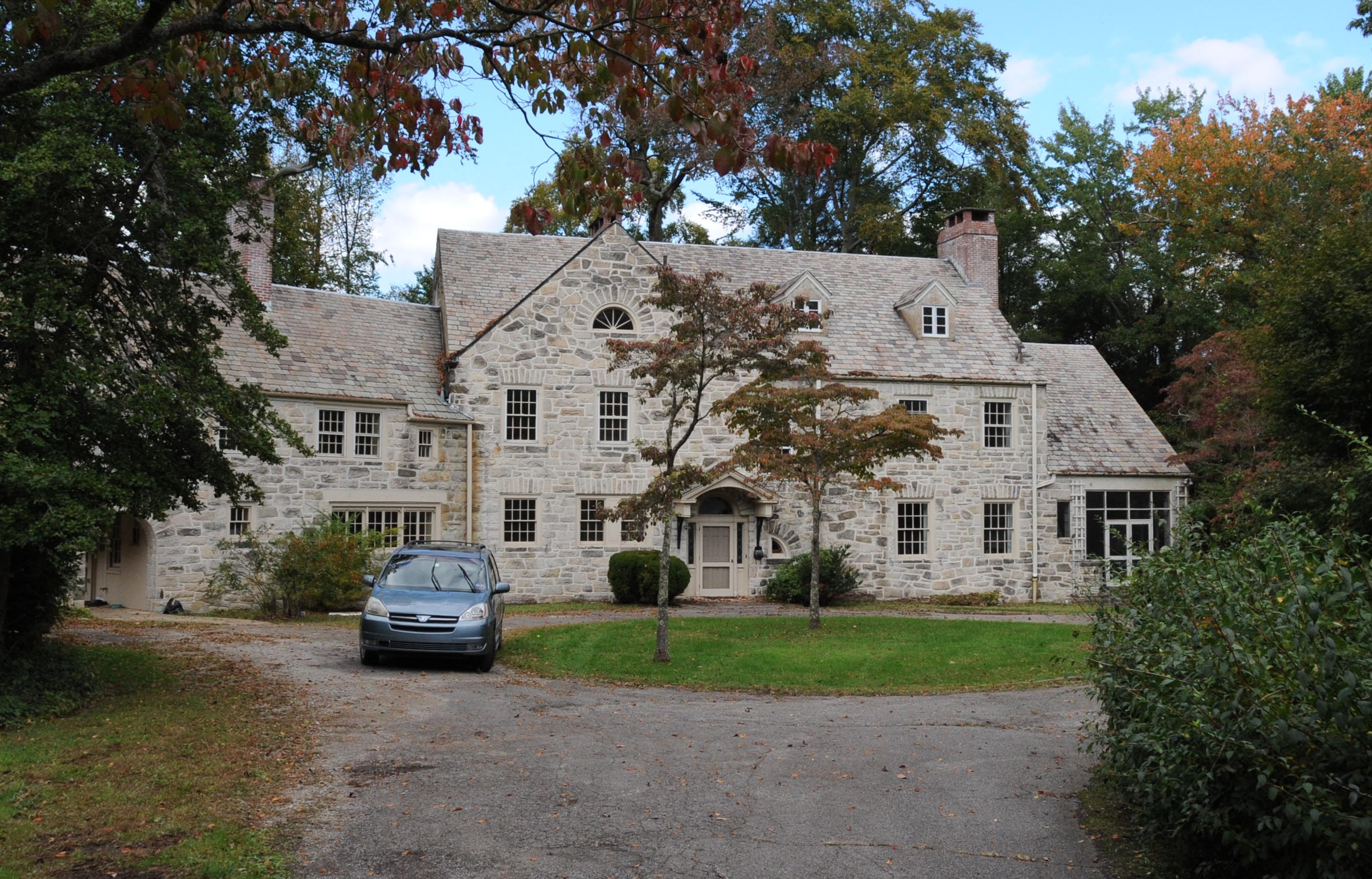

- Location within West Virginia Location within the United States
- Location: 909 Ridgeway Rd., Charleston, West Virginia
- Coordinates: 38°20′17″N 81°38′19″W
- Area: 2.5 acres (1.0 ha)
- Built: 1917
- Architectural style: English Romantic
- MPS: South Hills MRA
- NRHP reference No.: 84000411
- Added to NRHP: October 26, 1984

Stoneleigh, also known as the Charles E. Ward House or Ruffner Payne House, is a historic home located at Charleston, West Virginia. It was built in 1917 as the residence of Charles E. Ward, a leading West Virginia industrialist.

It was listed on the National Register of Historic Places in 1984 as part of the South Hills Multiple Resource Area.
