= Bank of St. Albans Building =

- U.S. National Register of Historic Places
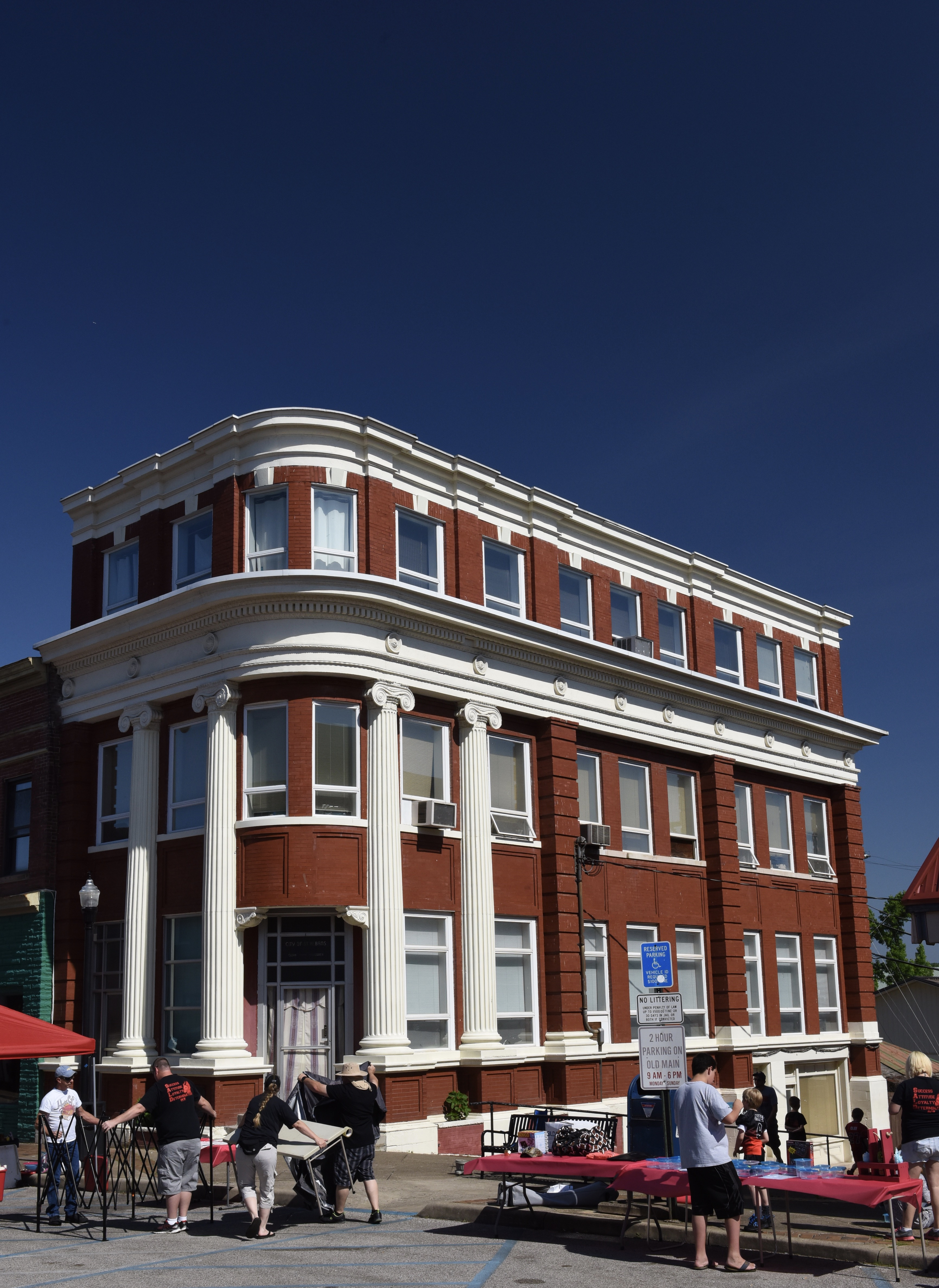

- Location within West Virginia Location within the United States
- Location: 80 Olde Main Plaza, St. Albans, West Virginia
- Coordinates: 38°23′11″N 81°50′21″W
- Area: 0.5 acres (0.20 ha)
- Built: 1906
- Architect: Guice, C.P.
- Architectural style: Classical Revival
- NRHP reference No.: 87002518
- Added to NRHP: February 1, 1988

Bank of St. Albans Building, also known as St. Albans City Building, is a historic bank building located at St. Albans, Kanawha County, West Virginia. It was built in 1906, and is a three-story, masonry building in the Classical Revival style. The front facade features two sets of fluted columns with Ionic order capitals. It housed a bank until 1961, after which it was occupied by city offices.

It was listed on the National Register of Historic Places in 1988.
