= Pratt, West Virginia =

- Town
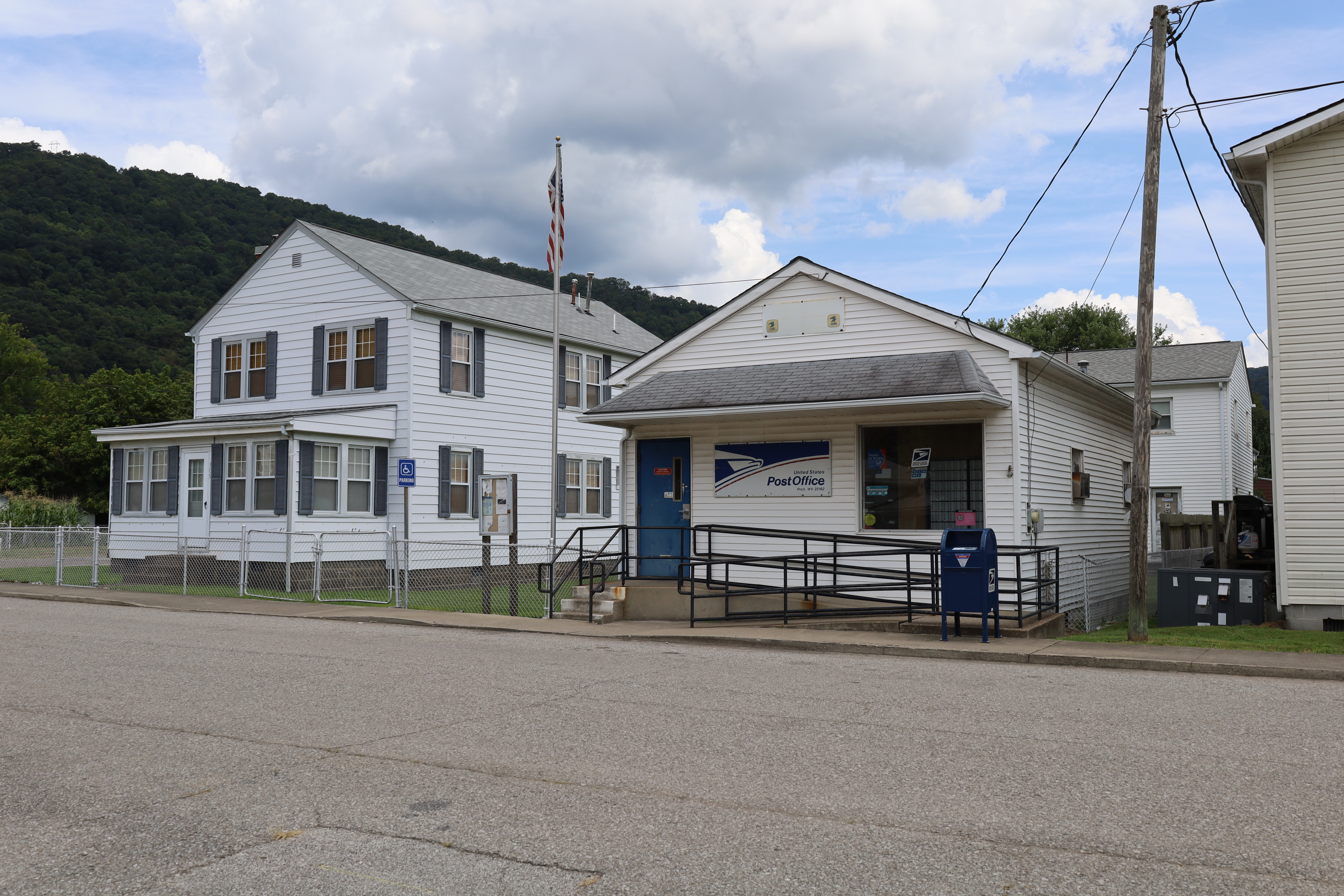
- Post office in 2021

- Logo

- Location of Pratt in Kanawha County, West Virginia.
- Coordinates: 38°12′26″N 81°23′14″W
- Country: United States
- State: West Virginia
- County: Kanawha
- Incorporated: June 4, 1905

Area
  - Total: 0.29 sq mi (0.76 km^{2})
  - Land: 0.29 sq mi (0.74 km^{2})
  - Water: 0.0039 sq mi (0.01 km^{2})
- Elevation: 633 ft (193 m)

Population (2020)
  - Total: 483
  - Estimate (2021): 471
  - Density: 1,941.4/sq mi (749.59/km^{2})
- Time zone: UTC-5 (Eastern (EST))
  - Summer (DST): UTC-4 (EDT)
- ZIP code: 25162
- Area code: 304
- FIPS code: 54-65356
- GNIS feature ID: 1555404
- Website: townofpratt.com

Pratt is a town in Kanawha County, West Virginia, United States, along the Kanawha River. The population was 482 at the 2020 census.

== History ==
The Pratt Historic District is listed on the National Register of Historic Places.

Until its incorporation in 1905, the town was known as Clifton. It was renamed Pratt after the owner of the Charles Pratt Coal Company, Charles Pratt. Many of the structures built by that company, including the miners' clubhouse for and various company houses are still standing.

== Geography ==
Pratt is located at 38°12′26″N 81°23′14″W (38.207149, -81.387354).

According to the United States Census Bureau, the town has a total area of 0.30 square miles (0.78 km^{2}), of which 0.29 square miles (0.75 km^{2}) is land and 0.01 square miles (0.03 km^{2}) is water.

== Demographics ==
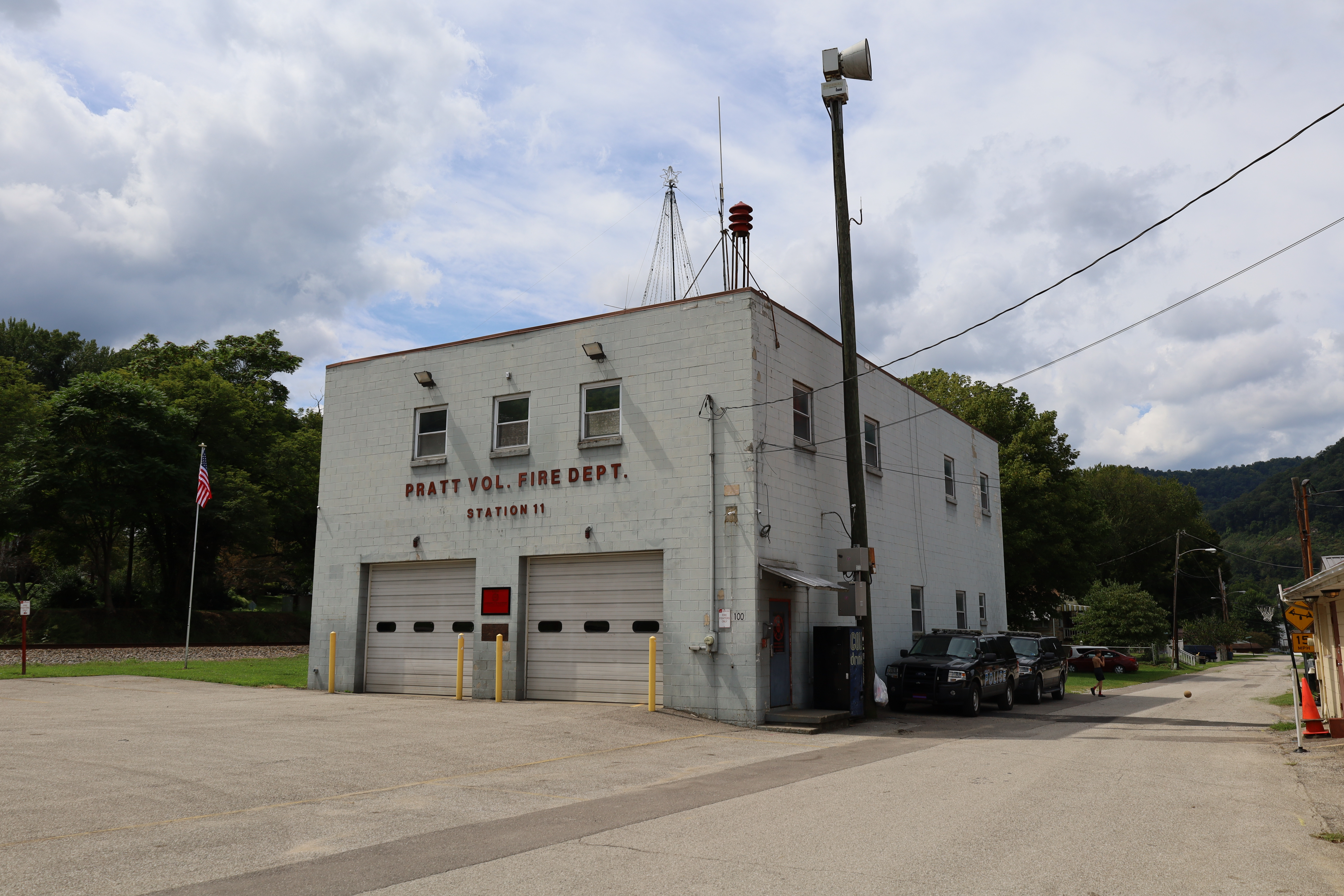
Fire station in 2021

Historical population
Census	Pop.	Note	%±
1910	306		—
1920	315		2.9%
1930	325		3.2%
1940	417		28.3%
1950	457		9.6%
1960	602		31.7%
1970	671		11.5%
1980	821		22.4%
1990	640		−22.0%
2000	551		−13.9%
2010	602		9.3%
2020	483		−19.8%
U.S. Decennial Census

=== 2010 census ===
As of the census of 2010, there were 602 people, 248 households, and 167 families living in the town. The population density was 2,075.9 inhabitants per square mile (801.5/km^{2}). There were 280 housing units at an average density of 965.5 per square mile (372.8/km^{2}). The racial makeup of the town was 96.5% White, 2.5% African American, 0.2% Native American, 0.2% Asian, and 0.7% from two or more races. Hispanic or Latino of any race were 1.2% of the population.

There were 248 households, of which 27.0% had children under the age of 18 living with them, 52.4% were married couples living together, 11.7% had a female householder with no husband present, 3.2% had a male householder with no wife present, and 32.7% were non-families. 29.4% of all households were made up of individuals, and 14.1% had someone living alone who was 65 years of age or older. The average household size was 2.43 and the average family size was 2.95.

The median age in the town was 41.3 years. 21.8% of residents were under the age of 18; 7.9% were between the ages of 18 and 24; 23.9% were from 25 to 44; 27.6% were from 45 to 64; and 18.6% were 65 years of age or older. The gender makeup of the town was 48.3% male and 51.7% female.

=== 2000 census ===
As of the census of 2000, there were 551 people, 239 households, and 163 families living in the town. The population density was 1,911.8 inhabitants per square mile (733.6/km^{2}). There were 251 housing units at an average density of 870.9 per square mile (334.2/km^{2}). The racial makeup of the town was 98.00% White, 0.54% African American, 0.18% Asian, 0.18% from other races, and 1.09% from two or more races. Hispanic or Latino of any race were 0.36% of the population.

There were 239 households, out of which 23.8% had children under the age of 18 living with them, 54.4% were married couples living together, 10.0% had a female householder with no husband present, and 31.4% were non-families. 28.5% of all households were made up of individuals, and 16.3% had someone living alone who was 65 years of age or older. The average household size was 2.31 and the average family size was 2.79.

In the town, the population was spread out, with 19.1% under the age of 18, 7.1% from 18 to 24, 27.0% from 25 to 44, 25.2% from 45 to 64, and 21.6% who were 65 years of age or older. The median age was 43 years. For every 100 females, there were 88.7 males. For every 100 females age 18 and over, there were 82.0 males.

The median income for a household in the town was $37,500, and the median income for a family was $42,115. Males had a median income of $31,500 versus $25,208 for females. The per capita income for the town was $18,773. About 5.4% of families and 9.4% of the population were below the poverty line, including 17.1% of those under age 18 and 5.2% of those age 65 or over.
