= Union Building =

Union Building(s) may refer to:

- Union Building (Charleston, West Virginia), US
- Union Building (Manhattan), or Decker Building, New York City, US
- Union Building (University of Texas at Austin), US
- Union Building, Aldershot, UK
- Union Building, Hong Kong, demolished in 1950, on the site of the present Chater House
- Union Building, Shanghai, China
- Union Building, Toronto, Canada
- Union Buildings, Pretoria, South Africa
- Union Buildings, on the campus of the University of Adelaide, Australia
