= Coal Exchange Building =

Skyscraper in Huntington, West Virginia

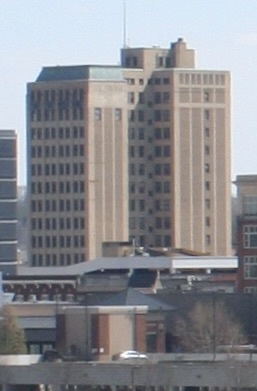
- Coal Exchange Building Huntington, West Virginia (2023) (cropped) The Coal Exchange Building in 2023

- Location within West Virginia Location within the United States

General information
- Status: Completed
- Type: Office
- Architectural style: Neo-Classical
- Location: 401 11th Street, Huntington, West Virginia, United States
- Coordinates: 38°25′15.82″N 82°26′26.28″W
- Construction started: 1924
- Completed: 1925

Height
- Roof: 161 ft (49 m)

Technical details
- Floor count: 14

Design and construction
- Architects: Meanor & Handloser

The Coal Exchange Building is a 161 ft (49 m) tall Neo-Classical style office building located on 401 11th Street in Downtown Huntington, West Virginia. The building has 14 floors and was built in 1925. The building currently is the 16th-tallest building in West Virginia and the 2nd-tallest building in Huntington. Upon its completion, it was the 5th-tallest building in West Virginia and the 2nd-tallest building in Huntington. (Note: The diagram does not include the 167 ft (51 m) tall Absure Tower in Wheeling.) The building was designed by Meanor & Handloser, who also designed the West Virginia Building, which is the tallest building in Huntington, and the former tallest building in West Virginia.

== History ==
The building was constructed in the 1920s due to economic growth in Huntington which was propelled by the coal and railroad industries. The Coal Exchange Company was a major company in the city of Huntington that was founded by H.A. Zeller, A. Solof, and D.C. Schonthal. The company commissioned Meanor & Handloser to design the building. The ground floor of the building became the new headquarters for the Coal Exchange Company upon its completion, while the top floors housed offices for various businesses, however, the Coal Exchange Company and many other businesses across the United States would close due to the Great Depression. In the early 1930s, the building was sold in an auction to the C&O Railway Company, which used the building as office space. In the 2000s, the ground floor of the building was homed to Glenn’s Sporting Goods. The building throughout the years would switch between various tenants and owners, before becoming vacant in 2019.

In 2019, the building was put on auction. The building was sold to Whirlwind Properties LLC for around $500,000, however, after the auction, they yielded the sale to McGuire Realty who represented Jay Barta. Barta planned to convert the top floors of the building to a hotel or apartments, and the bottom floors for commercial use.

In 2024, the owner of the building announced that they were seeking construction bids from architectural firms that were familiar with historical office building conversions to help turn the building into a boutique hotel.

The building is planned to go back up on auction in March 2026.

== See also ==
- List of tallest buildings in West Virginia
- 900 on Lee
