= List of tallest buildings in West Virginia =

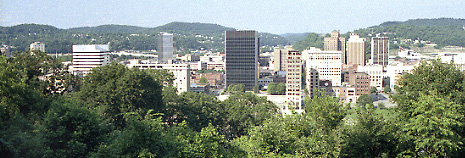
Charleston skyline viewed from the grounds of the Sunrise Museum

This list of tallest buildings in West Virginia ranks the tallest buildings in the U.S. state of West Virginia by height. The tallest building in the state is the West Virginia State Capital, standing at 292 ft (89 m) tall in Charleston, West Virginia. As of 2025, the seven tallest buildings in the state are located in Charleston.

West Virginia has 20 buildings that are 100 ft (30 m) or higher. A large portion of these buildings are found in Charleston. Other cities that have buildings appearing on the list include Morgantown, Huntington, and Wheeling.

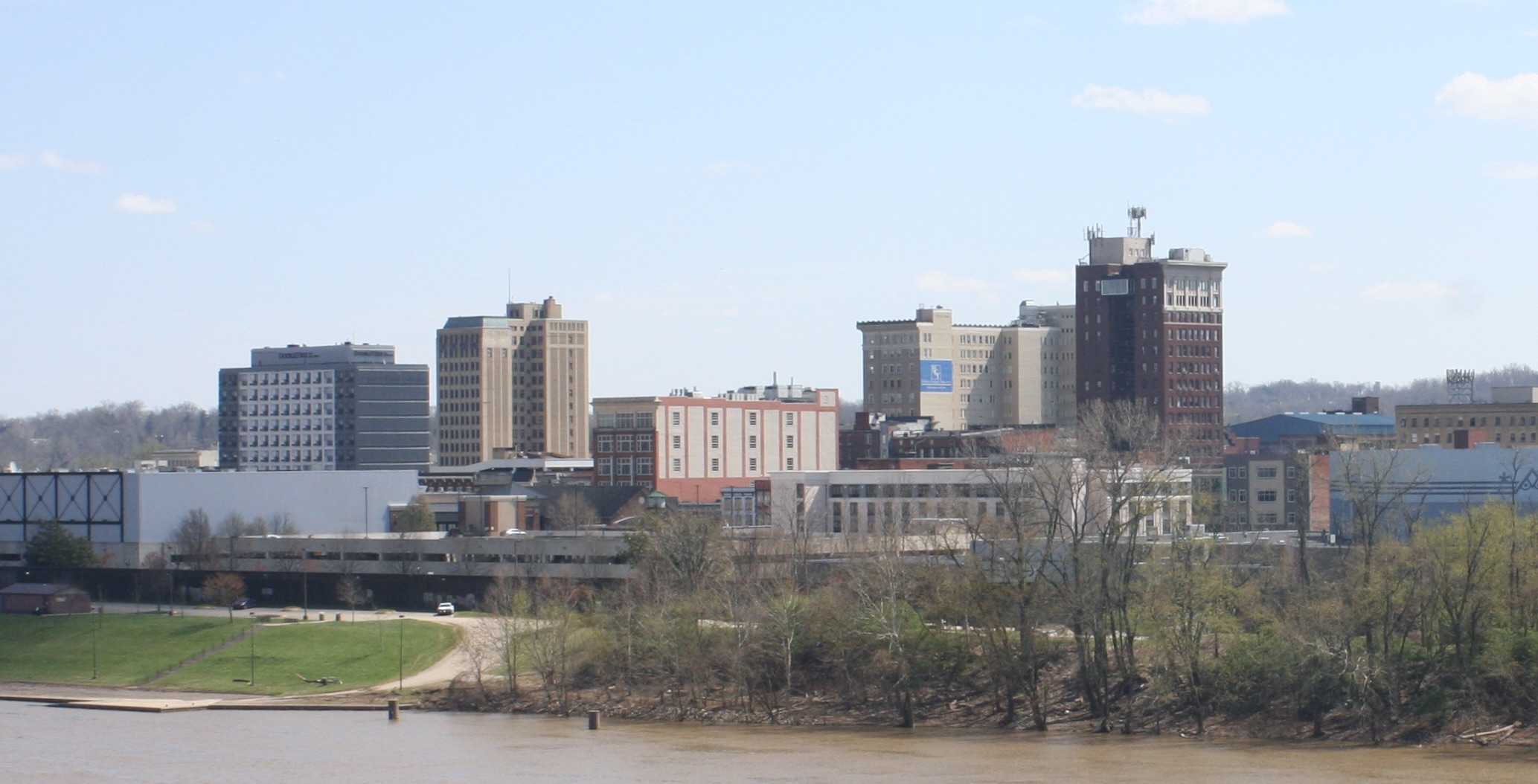
Huntington skyline in 2023

The history of skyscrapers in West Virginia started with the construction of the 167 ft (51 m) Schmulbach Building, completed in Wheeling in 1907. The current tallest building in the state, the 292 ft (89 m) West Virginia State Capitol, was built in Charleston in 1932. Since then, several building booms have occurred, but none have resulted in a taller building. In 2003, the tallest building in Morgantown and the 8th tallest in West Virginia named Two Waterfront Plaza was built. During the 2000s, several older office high-rises in West Virginia have been converted into residential spaces, including the 200 ft (61 m) West Virginia Building and the 189 ft (58 m) Union Tower.

== Tallest buildings ==
Below are the 20 tallest highrises in West Virginia with a height of over 100 ft (30 m), based on standard height measurements. This includes spires and architectural details but does not include antenna masts. An equals sign (=) following a rank indicates the same height between two or more buildings.

Rank	Name	Image	Height ft (m)	Floors	Year	City	Notes
1	West Virginia State Capitol		292 ft (89 m)	4	1932	Charleston	Tallest building constructed in West Virginia in the 1930s. Tallest building in West Virginia.
2	Kanawha Valley Building		265 ft (81 m)	20	1929	Charleston	Tallest building in West Virginia upon completion. The building underwent a modernization effort in the 1960s.
3	Laidley Tower		255 ft (78 m)	18	1985	Charleston	The building was placed into receivership in 2015 before being sold to Seattle-based Bridge333 Capital in 2018.
4	BB&T Square		250 ft (76 m)	15	1976	Charleston	Formerly known as the Truist Building.
5	AT&T Building		236 ft (72 m)	11		Charleston	In 2024, a back-up generator exploded on the roof of the Building.
6	Chase Center		229 ft (70 m)	18	1969	Charleston	Formerly known as the Bank One Center and Charleston National Plaza.
7	900 on Lee	Huntington Square Charleston Kanawha River (cropped)	207 ft (63 m)	17	1969	Charleston	Formerly known as Commerce Square. The building was sold in 2021.
8=	Two Waterfront Plaza		205 ft (62 m)	17	2003	Morgantown	Tallest building in Morgantown. The tower contains a 205-room Radisson Hotell, along with luxury residential units.
8=	United Bank Center		205 ft (62 m)	14	1984	Charleston	Was designed by Odell Associates, Silling Associates, and Emery Roth.
10	West Virginia Building		200 ft (61 m)	15	1925	Huntington	Tallest building in Huntington. While originally office space, the building is now luxury apartments.
11	Imperial Towers		192 ft (59 m)	18	1965	Charleston	The building contains apartments.
12	Union Building		189 ft (58 m)	13	1911	Charleston	Upon completion, the building was the tallest in the state.
13	Charleston Marriott Town Center		175 ft (53 m)	16	1982	Charleston	The 352-room hotel shares interconnected parking garages with a mall.
14	Historic Wheeling-Pitt Lofts		167 ft (51 m)	12	1907	Wheeling	Formerly known as the Schmulbach Building and later the Wheeling-Pittsburgh Steel Building. In 2023, the building was redeveloped into market-rate apartments.
15	Absure Tower		167 ft (51 m)	9	1915	Wheeling	The tower was built in 1915 as the Wheeling branch of the National Bank of West Virginia.
16	Coal Exchange Building	Coal_Exchange_Building_Huntington,_West_Virginia_(2023)_(cropped)	160 ft (49 m)	14	1925	Huntington	In 2019, the building sold for $500,000. In 2024, the building sought bids from architectural firms familiar with historical office building conversions.
17	United Carbon Building		157 ft (48 m)	12	1940	Charleston	The building was commissioned in 1939 as the headquarters for the United Carbon Company.
18	Daniel Boone Hotel	13/4x134px	136 ft (41 m)	10	1929	Charleston	The former hotel is on the National Register of Historic Places.
19	Kaley Center		132 ft (40 m)	10	1922	Wheeling	Formerly known as the Riley Law Building. The building was purchased in 2011 and underwent extensive renovations.
20	Professional Building		125 ft (38 m)	6	1891	Wheeling	The building was purchased by Wheeling Mayor Glenn Elliot in October 2013.
