= Union Building (Charleston, West Virginia) =

Office building in Charleston, West Virginia

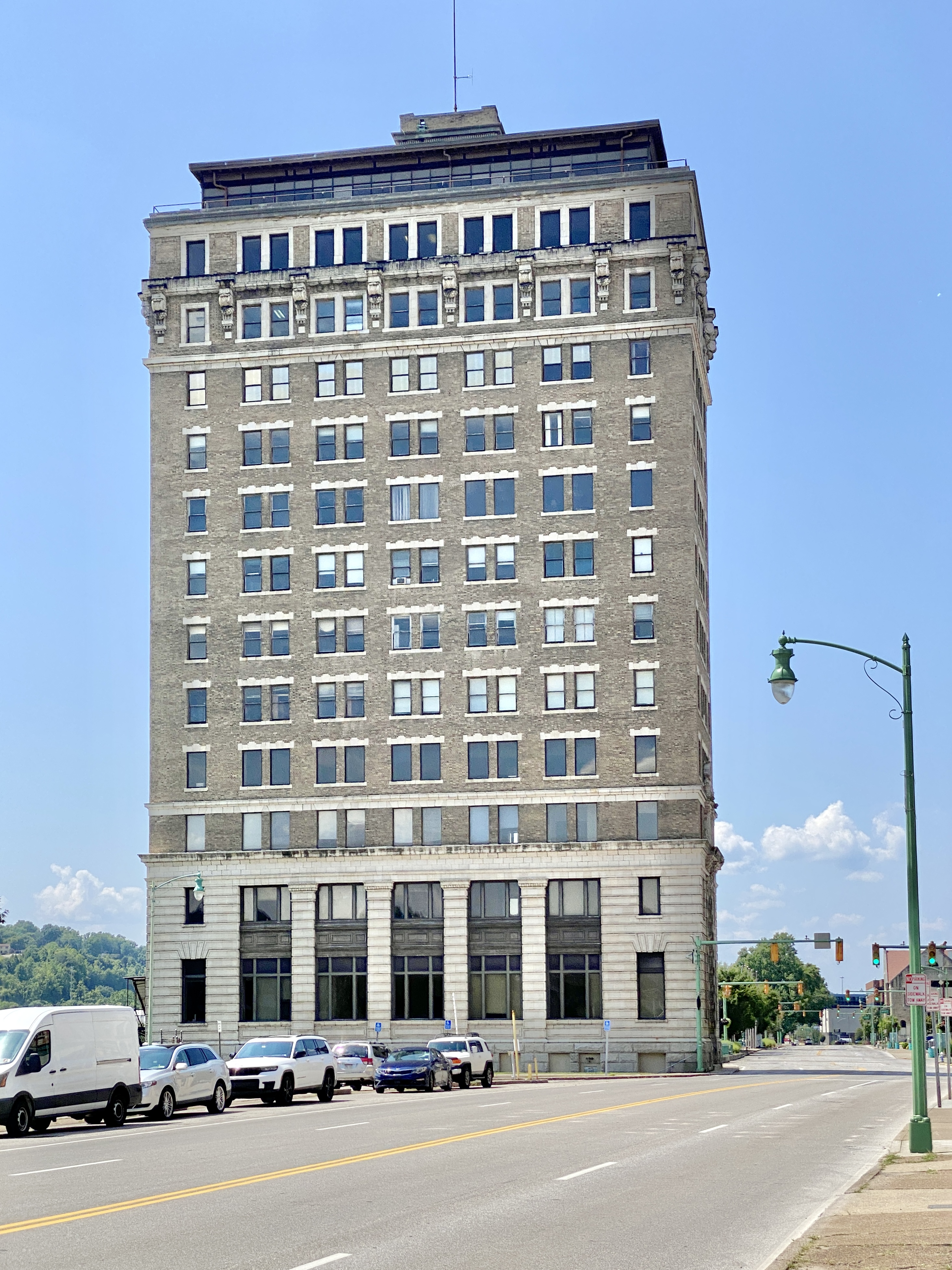
- Union_Building_(Alderson-Stephenson_Building),_Kanawha_Boulevard,_Charleston,_WV_-_53679063267 The Union Building in July 2023

- Location within West Virginia Union Building (Charleston, West Virginia) (the United States)

General information
- Status: Completed
- Type: Office
- Architectural style: Neoclassical
- Location: 723 Kanawha Boulevard East, Charleston, West Virginia, United States
- Coordinates: 38°20′55″N 81°38′14″W
- Completed: 1911

Height
- Roof: 189 ft (58 m)

Technical details
- Floor count: 14

Design and construction
- Architects: Harding and Upman

The Union Building (also known as the Alderson–Stephenson Building) is a 189 ft (58 m) tall neoclassical style office building located on 723 Kanawha Boulevard East in Downtown Charleston, West Virginia. It was built in 1911 and has 14 floors. When it was built it was the tallest building in Charleston and in the state of West Virginia. As of January 2026 it is the 12th-tallest building in West Virginia.

The building was financed by two Charleston natives which the building was then named after. From 1938 to 1940, the construction of Kanawha Boulevard led to the demolition of many of its neighboring buildings. The building was not demolished due to high demolition costs, leaving it as the only surviving building on the riverfront-side of the boulevard. In May 2024, the building went up for auction and was sold for $950,000, however the seller then denied the bid and continued to look for potential buyers.

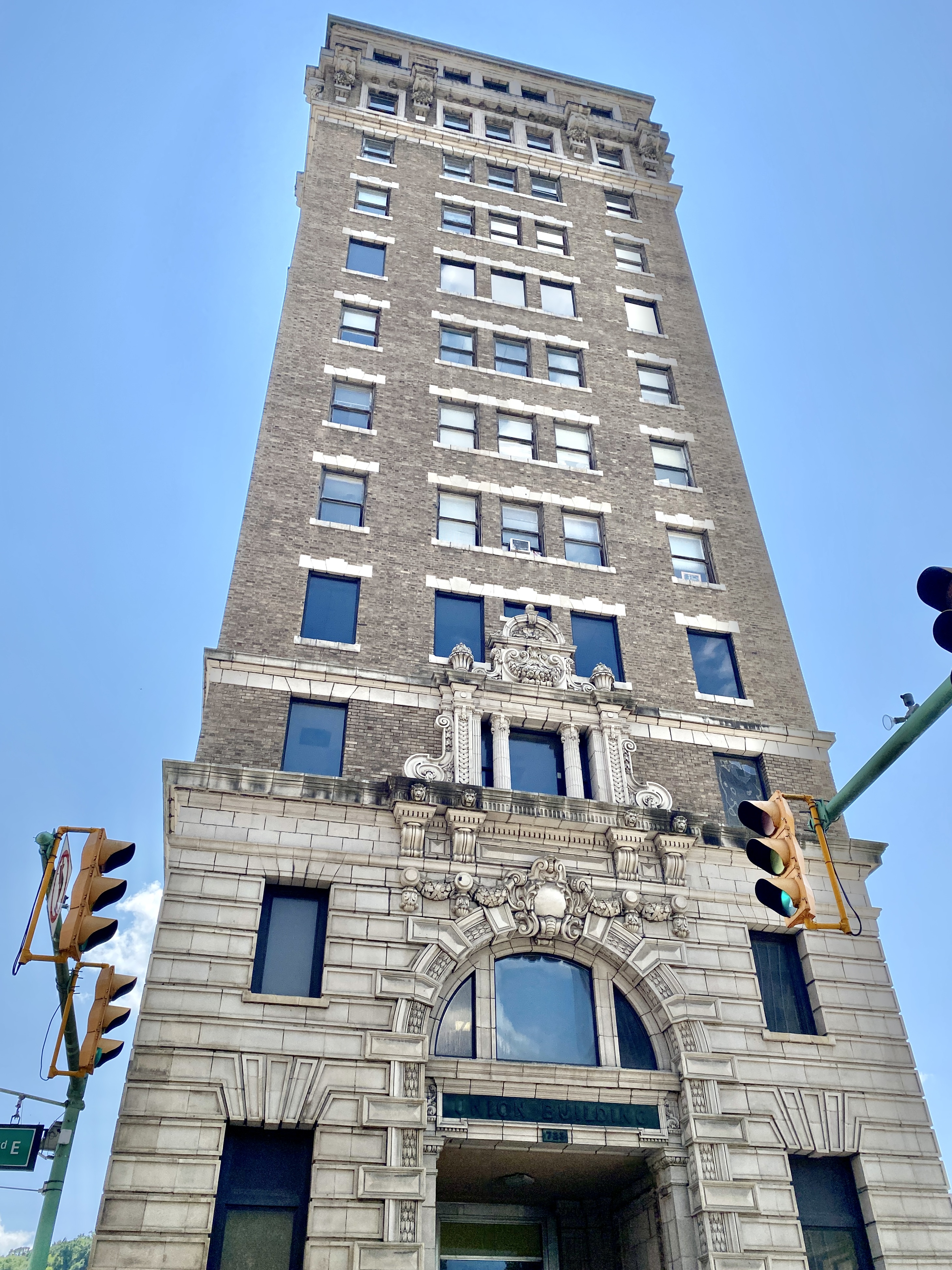
The Union Building from a different angle.

== See also ==
- List of tallest buildings in West Virginia
- West Virginia State Capitol
- Daniel Boone Hotel
- United Carbon Building
