= Holly Grove Mansion =

Historic house in West Virginia, United States

- U.S. National Register of Historic Places
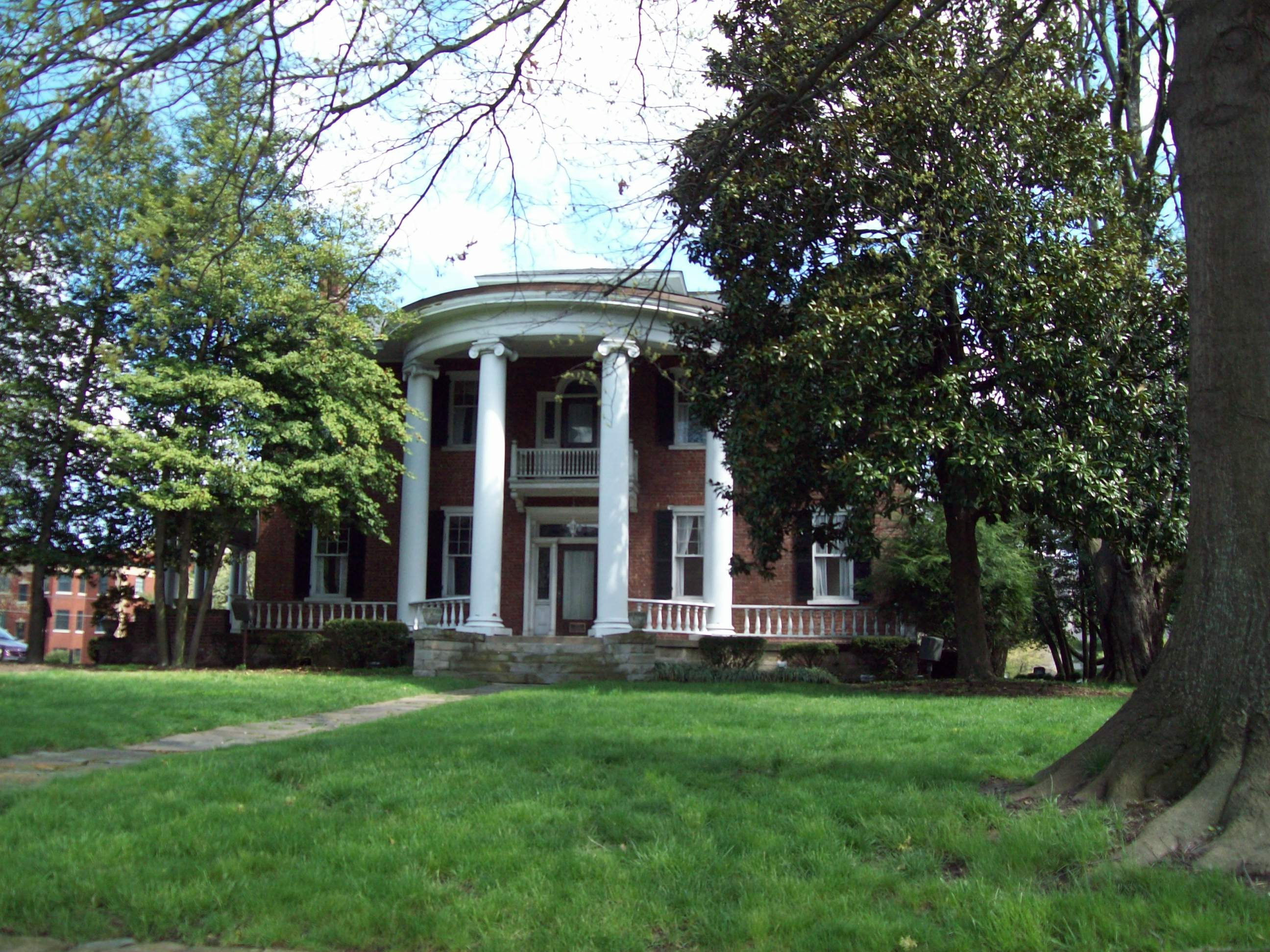
- Holly Grove Mansion, April 2009

- Location within West Virginia Location within the United States
- Location: 1710 E. Kanawha Blvd., Charleston, West Virginia
- Coordinates: 38°20′11″N 81°36′56″W
- Built: 1815
- NRHP reference No.: 74002007
- Added to NRHP: August 28, 1974

Holly Grove Mansion, also known as Holly Grove Inn or Ruffner Mansion, is a historic home located at Charleston, West Virginia on the grounds of the West Virginia State Capitol. It is a large brick house with a front section made to accommodate three floors and rear section housing two. It features a massive two story, semi-circular portico at the front entrance. It was constructed originally in 1815 as the home of Daniel Ruffner, one of a family which helped develop the early salt industry in the Kanawha Valley. It gained its present-day appearance in about 1902 when new owner, John Nash, undertook substantial remodeling. In 1979, the mansion underwent an extensive rehabilitation when it became headquarters for the West Virginia Commission on Aging.

It was listed on the National Register of Historic Places in 1974.
