= Walter F. Martens =

American architect

Walter Frederic Martens (March 15, 1890 – July 8, 1969) was an American architect who worked mainly in West Virginia. He is best known for building the West Virginia Governor's Mansion (1926).

== Early life and career ==
Martens was born in Danville, Illinois. He trained in the office of architect L. F. W. Stuebe of Danville as a draftsman from 1913 to 1918 and as a junior member from 1919 to 1921. Martens moved to West Virginia the same year and opened an office in Charleston.

== West Virginia and his own office ==
Martens won the competition to design the West Virginia governor's mansion in 1923 and it was completed in 1925. Other commissions followed and Martens designed Homeland, a Colonial-revival residence in Lewisburg, West Virginia. He also designed several homes in Charleston including a stone house for Mrs. Cyrus W. Hall at Ruffner and Kanawha Boulevard and Torquilstone for William Goshorn MacCorkle, the son of Governor William A. MacCorkle. He also designed churches. He designed the Charleston Woman’s Club in a French Chateauesque style.

In the 1930s he worked more in Art Deco and Moderne styles designing the Cavalier and Belvedere Apartments (1935) in Charleston and Riverview Terrace apartments (1937). He partnered with his son Robert Martens from 1941, and their work includes Ripley High School and the Charleston Civic Center.

Martens was a member of the state Board of Architects, was the West Virginia chapter president of the American Institute of Architects (AIA) and was made a fellow of the AIA in 1952. He was president of the National Council of Architectural Registration Boards in 1959 and 1960. He died in Charleston.

== Notable buildings ==
He designed buildings in West Virginia including the West Virginia Governor's Mansion (1926), part of the West Virginia Capitol Complex. He coordinated the project with Cass Gilbert to ensure the buildings complemented one another. Martens also designed Albert and Liberal Arts Halls (1924) for Davis and Elkins College in Elkins, West Virginia. He designed buildings that are part of the Alderson Historic District in Alderson, West Virginia and St. Albans Main Street Historic District in St. Albans, West Virginia. He also designed the United Carbon Building at 1018 East Kanawha Boulevard in Charleston, West Virginia that is listed on the National Register of Historic Places.
