= 900 on Lee =

Office building in Charleston, West Virginia

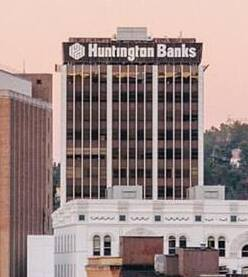
- Huntington_Square_Downtown_Charleston_(cropped) Huntington Square in 2016.

- Location within West Virginia 900 on Lee (the United States)

General information
- Status: Completed
- Type: Mixed-Use
- Architectural style: International
- Location: 900 Lee Street East Charleston, West Virginia, United States
- Coordinates: 38°20′59″N 81°37′58″W
- Completed: 1969

Height
- Roof: 207 ft (63 m)

Technical details
- Floor count: 17

Design and construction
- Architect: C. E. Silling Associates

900 on Lee (also known as the WesBanco Center and formerly as Huntington Square and Commerce Square) is a 207 ft (63 m) tall international style mixed-use building located on 900 Lee Street East in Downtown Charleston, West Virginia. The building has 17 floors and was built in 1969. The building is currently the 7th-tallest building in West Virginia and the 7th-tallest building in Charleston.

The building served as the West Virginia regional headquarters for Huntington Bank until 2018, when they moved to the nearby Laidley Tower, which is the 3rd-tallest building in the city.

The building was designed by C. E. Silling Associates who also designed the nearby Chase Center. From 2021 to 2022, the building was renovated and converted from an office building to a mixed-use building with apartments. The first 2 floors of the building house the WesBanco Center, which owns the signage rights for the building.

A bronze sculpture by Milton Horn known as "Man Wrest from the Earth Its Natural Resources to Build Pathways to the Stars" is mounted on the buildings exterior. He was commissioned by the National Bank of Commerce to design the sculpture for the building.

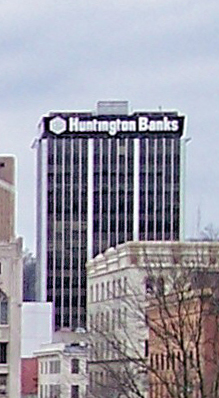
Huntington Square in 2007

== See also ==
- List of tallest buildings in West Virginia
- Huntington Bank
- Union Building (Charleston, West Virginia)
