= West Virginia Governor's Mansion =

- U.S. Historic district – Contributing property

- Location within West Virginia
- Location: 1716 Kanawha Blvd., Charleston, Kanawha County, West Virginia, United States
- Coordinates: 38°20′10″N 81°36′53″W
- Area: 21,000 square feet (2,000 m^{2})
- Built: 1925
- Architect: Walter F. Martens
- Architectural style: Georgian Colonial
- Part of: West Virginia Capitol Complex (ID74002009)
- Added to NRHP: December 31, 1974

The West Virginia Governor's Mansion (or West Virginia Executive Mansion) is a historic residence located next to the Kanawha River in Charleston, West Virginia and is the official residence of the governor of West Virginia.

The Colonial Revival (Georgian Revival) building was completed in 1925 by Charleston architect Walter F. Martens and is part of the West Virginia Capitol Complex, which also includes the West Virginia State Capitol. The building itself has a red brick exterior, with a columned portico at the entrance. The foyer was inspired by the White House, with checkered black-and-white marble flooring and dual staircases. The first floor of the mansion includes the drawing room, ballroom, state dining room, library, and a sitting room. The second floor houses the governor's own rooms, as well as those of his family, while additional bedrooms are on the third floor. In all, the structure has 30 rooms. The mansion also features walled gardens, a separate garage, and servant quarters.

The total cost of the mansion, including land, construction, and furnishings, was approximately $203,000 at the time of its construction.

== History ==
The first Governor's Mansion was bought by the state in 1893 from a private company, using $22,000 appropriated by the state with the help of outgoing governor Aretas B. Fleming. The first governor to live in this mansion was William MacCorkle, who succeeded Fleming. The building, a large, wooden, white, two-story structure in the Queen Anne style, was built originally as a private residence for local merchants. It served eight different governors, from 1893 to 1925. Prior to its purchase, governors of West Virginia were responsible for their own housing. A fire on January 3, 1921, resulted in the destruction of the old state capitol building in Charleston. As a result, a 1921 session of the West Virginia Legislature created a seven-member "Capitol Building Commission". On July 23 of that year, Cass Gilbert was chosen to direct construction for the new complex, which was to include a capitol building as well as an executive mansion. The location for the complex was chosen on December 20, 1921. Groundbreaking for the complex occurred on January 7, 1924, and the entire state capitol building was completed in 1932. Three parcels of land for the actual mansion were acquired on July 7, 1921, at a cost of $64,270, and construction began in 1924 and ended in 1925. The work was overseen by local architect Walter F. Martens, but he was not greatly involved in the design of the neighboring capitol building. Compared to Gilbert, who was already an accomplished architect, Martens had less experience and had never worked on a project of this size. However, Martens had traveled to New York City to talk with Gilbert about designs for the project, and both had similar ideas for the building's Georgian style. Martens also traveled to see the White House, which was to be a model for the new mansion. His visit allowed him to learn how to create a floor plan able to accommodate heavy traffic of guests, as many as 2,000 visitors at once.

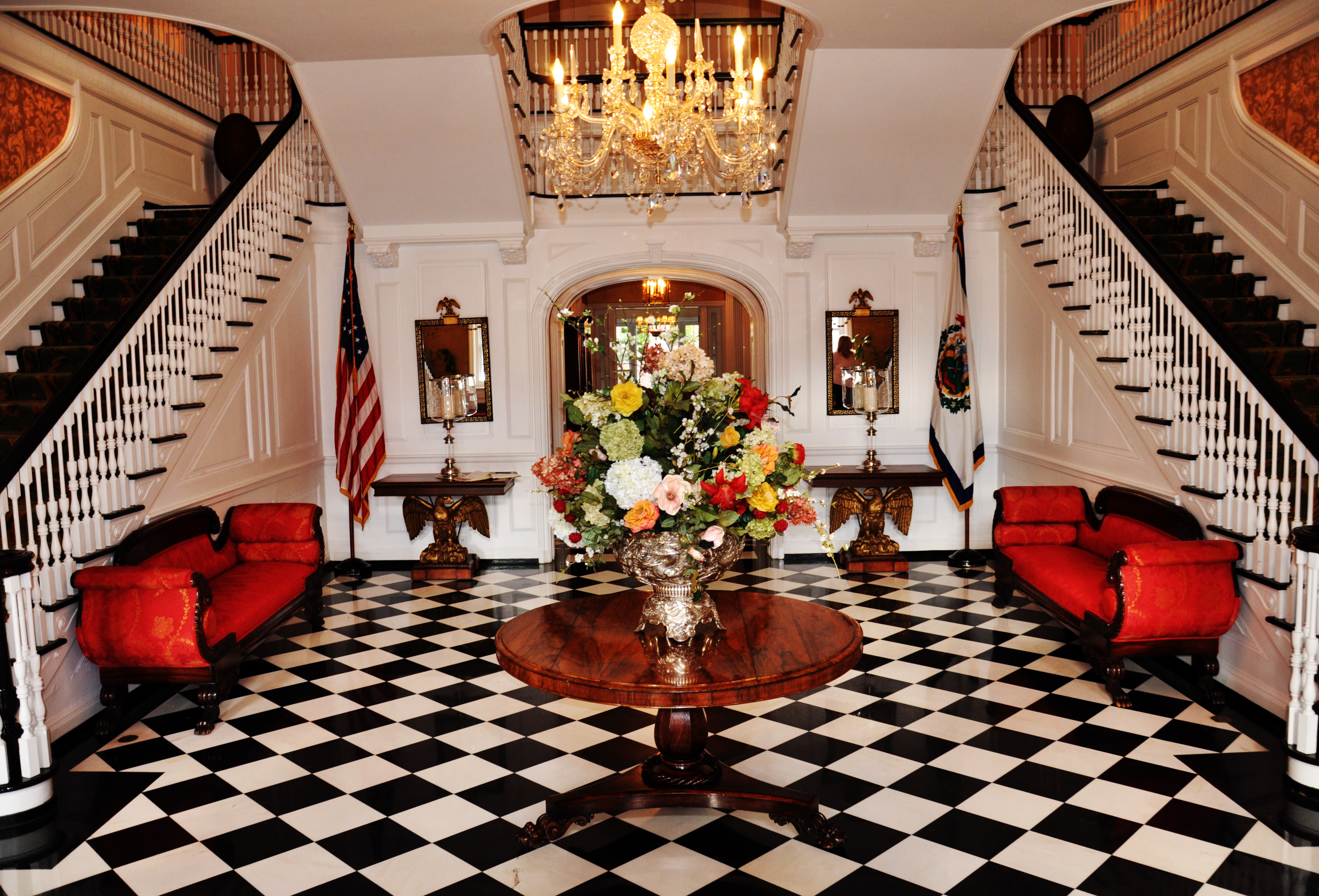
The foyer has checkered marble flooring and dual staircases.

The building's first occupant, Ephraim F. Morgan, who had first proposed to the state the construction of a new residence, only lived in the new mansion for one week because his term expired during 1925. In 1926, servant's quarters were added atop a garage, along with private gardens. Since its completion, the mansion has had several redecorations, including one in 1937 and one in 1958. The original building plans for the mansion included a third story, but one was not added until much later, in 1946. Before this addition, the second floor had been covered with a roof composed of tin, but it was replaced by one made of slate.

From 1965 to 1969, during the term of Hulett C. Smith, the mansion underwent a thorough renovation process, with a total of $300,000 spent in both structural improvements and historic preservation efforts. In 1985, during Governor Arch Moore's third term, First Lady Shelley Moore established the West Virginia Mansion Preservation Foundation, which raised funds for the maintenance of the mansion's interior and furnishings. Later, in 2005, Governor Joe Manchin cited structural defects as a reason for repairing and remodeling the mansion. Their efforts, which cost an estimated $1.2 million, used both leftover campaign money as well as private funds. In 2006, the addition of a large banquet hall was proposed. The hall, which would be able to hold 335 guests, would be connected to the mansion and also have barracks for the governor's security personnel in its basement. Later that year, in July, it was announced that the total cost of renovations to the building had exceeded $3 million, excluding furnishings.
