= West Virginia Capitol Complex =

- U.S. National Register of Historic Places
- U.S. Historic district
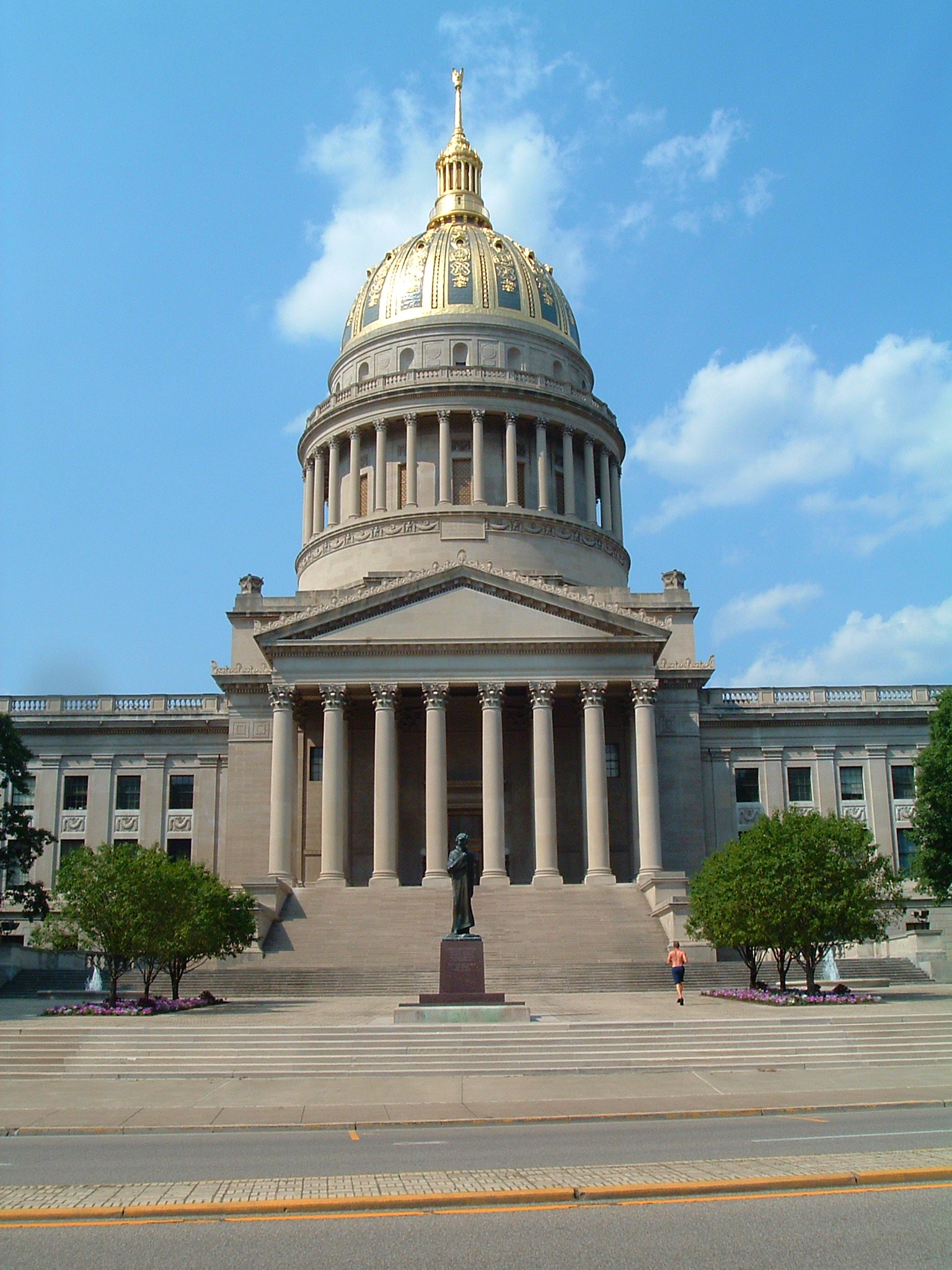

- Location within West Virginia Location within the United States
- Location: Along Kanawha Blvd., E., Charleston, West Virginia
- Coordinates: 38°20′12″N 81°36′43″W
- Area: 18 acres (7.3 ha)
- Built: 1925
- Architect: Cass Gilbert; Walter F. Martens
- Architectural style: Colonial Revival, Italian Renaissance
- NRHP reference No.: 74002009
- Added to NRHP: December 31, 1974

The West Virginia Capitol Complex is an 18-acre (7.3 ha) historic district located along Kanawha Blvd., E., in Charleston, West Virginia. It dates from 1925 and was listed on the National Register of Historic Places in 1974.

The complex includes the West Virginia State Capitol, designed and supervised by architect Cass Gilbert and built in three sections. It also includes the governor's residence, West Virginia Executive Mansion, designed by Charleston architect Walter F. Martens.

It includes Colonial Revival architecture and Italian Renaissance architecture.

It includes two contributing buildings, one the capitol building and one a residence.
