= West Virginia State Capitol =

Capitol building of the US state of West Virginia

- U.S. Historic district – Contributing property
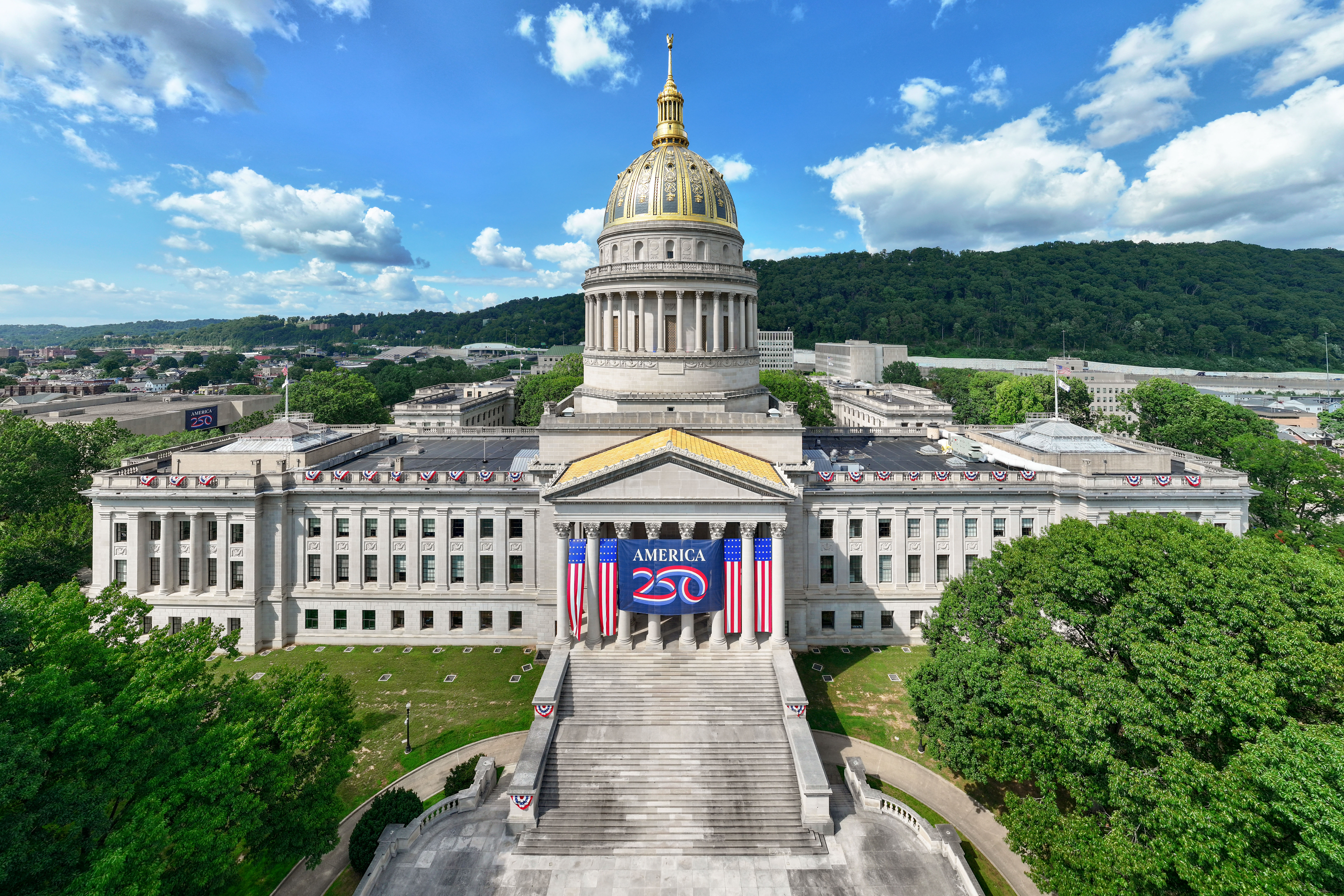
- The capitol building in 2026, with decorations for the United States Semiquincentennial

- Location within West Virginia
- Location: 1900 Kanawha Boulevard East, Charleston, West Virginia, U.S.
- Coordinates: 38°20′10″N 81°36′43″W
- Built: 1932; 94 years ago
- Architect: Cass Gilbert
- Architectural style: Neoclassical
- Part of: West Virginia Capitol Complex (ID74002009)
- Added to NRHP: December 31, 1974

The West Virginia State Capitol is the seat of government for the U.S. state of West Virginia, and houses the West Virginia Legislature and the office of the Governor of West Virginia. Located in Charleston, West Virginia, the building was designed by Cass Gilbert and dedicated in 1932. Along with the West Virginia Executive Mansion it is part of the West Virginia Capitol Complex, a historic district listed on the National Register of Historic Places.

== Background ==
Prior to the American Civil War, the counties that would ultimately form West Virginia were a part of the state of Virginia; the state capital was in Richmond, Virginia. After Virginia seceded from the Union in 1861, the northwestern counties of Virginia loyal to the United States started the process which would ultimately create the State of West Virginia on June 20, 1863.

Settling on a state capital location proved to be difficult. For several years, the capital of West Virginia shifted back and forth between Wheeling and Charleston. Other locations, including Martinsburg and Clarksburg were offered as alternatives. The state's citizens voted on the final location of their capital, Charleston, on August 7, 1877.

== Prior capitols ==
=== Wheeling, 1863 ===
When the state seceded from Virginia and the Confederacy in early 1861, prior to its official admission to the Union, Wheeling was the de facto capital of the new state, then known as the, "Reorganized Government of Virginia."

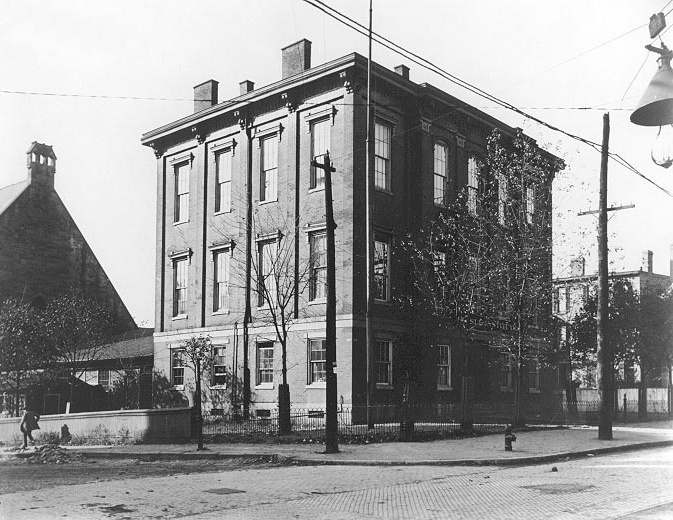
Linsly School was the first West Virginia capitol building, located in Wheeling and in use from 1863 to 1870.

From the state's official inception in 1863 (i.e., the date of its admission to the Union), the legislature met in the building of the Linsly Military Institute, on Eoff Street in Wheeling. The government soon outgrew this building, which had been built in 1859. In 1865, the legislature voted to move to Charleston, which was to be the permanent capital city. The legislature remained in Wheeling until 1870, when the new building was completed.

=== Charleston, 1870 ===
In 1869, construction began on a new building on Capitol Street in downtown Charleston. The new building was designed by Leroy S. Buffington of Anderson & Hannaford, Cincinnati. The new building was architecturally eclectic, combining elements of the French Baroque, Second Empire, and High Victorian Gothic styles. The legislature met in the building until 1875, when the City of Wheeling offered to build a new capitol building if the legislature would agree to return to the city. This choice was fueled by the greater accessibility of Wheeling as Charleston did not have rail access.

=== Wheeling, 1875 ===
The legislature was transferred back to Wheeling in 1875, and met in the Linsly building until the new one was completed in 1876. This building, by Joseph S. Fairfax, was a very large Second Empire building. The next year, a statewide election was held to determine a permanent capitol. Due to anti-Wheeling sentiment, the city was not even a choice. Charleston was selected, and in the fall of 1877, Governor Jacob issued a proclamation that after 1885, that city would be the permanent state capital.

After the Charleston building was completed in 1885, the Wheeling building was remodeled by architect Charles P. Hamilton to serve the dual functions of city hall and county courthouse. It survived until 1959, when a new building went up on the same site.

=== Charleston, 1885 ===
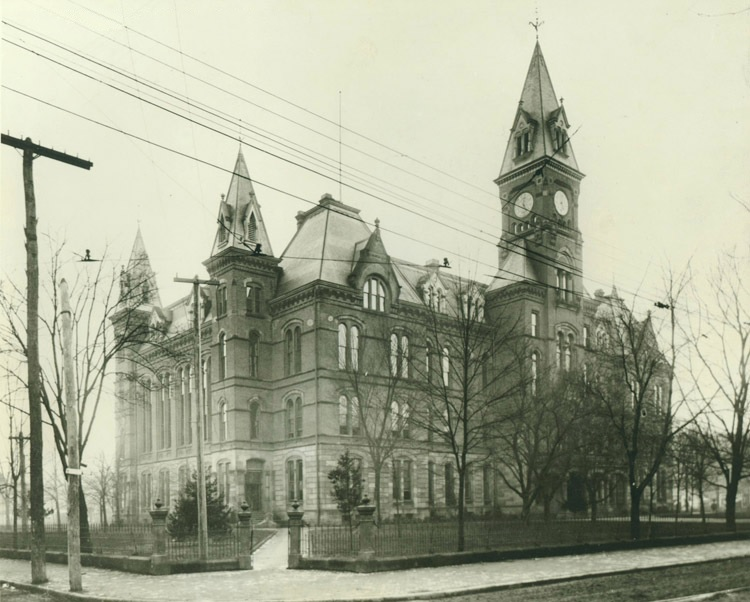
First Charleston capitol building, in use from 1885 to 1921; it burned to the ground in 1921

Construction on the second Charleston capitol began in 1880, to plans by Pittsburgh architect Andrew Peebles, with supervision by C. C. Kemble of Wheeling, and then Charleston. The 1870 building was almost completely destroyed for the new building. Kemble was relieved from his duties in 1884, and Stanton M. Howard of Wheeling completed the building in 1885. Unlike its predecessor, this was an informal and picturesque High Victorian Gothic building. It stood until it was gutted by a fire in 1921, which left only the exterior walls still standing. The ruins were promptly demolished.

=== Charleston, 1921 ===
A new temporary wooden building was hastily built by the state in 1921. It was derisively referred to as the "pasteboard capitol". It was built on Washington Street near the old site, with the expectation that the new building would be built on the old site. However, a riverside site in the eastern end of the city was chosen, and the downtown site was sold off. It was quickly developed. The temporary capitol was completely destroyed in a 1927 fire.

== Present capitol ==
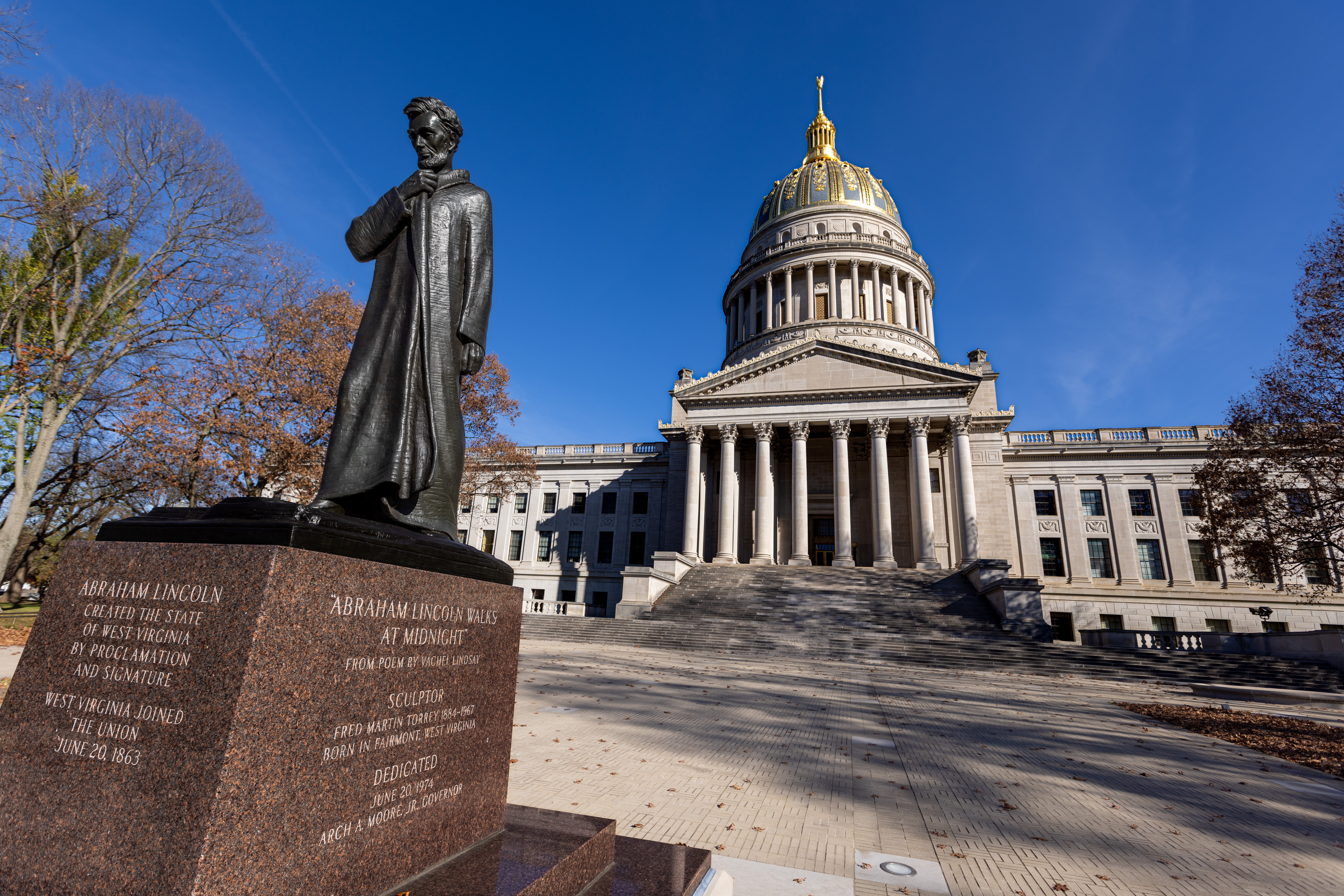
Lincoln statue on WV capitol grounds

A Capitol Building Commission, created by the Legislature in 1921, authorized construction of the present capitol. Architect Cass Gilbert designed the buff limestone structure that was to have a final cost of just under $10 million. Construction began in 1924, the cornerstone was laid on November 5, 1930, and, after the three stages of construction were completed, Governor William G. Conley dedicated the capitol on June 20, 1932.

Gilbert liked his design of the West Virginia chamber's interior so well that he reused part of the design for the United States Supreme Court. The U.S. Supreme Court chamber is a larger version of the one found in the West Virginia Capitol's East Wing.

== Capitol plaza ==
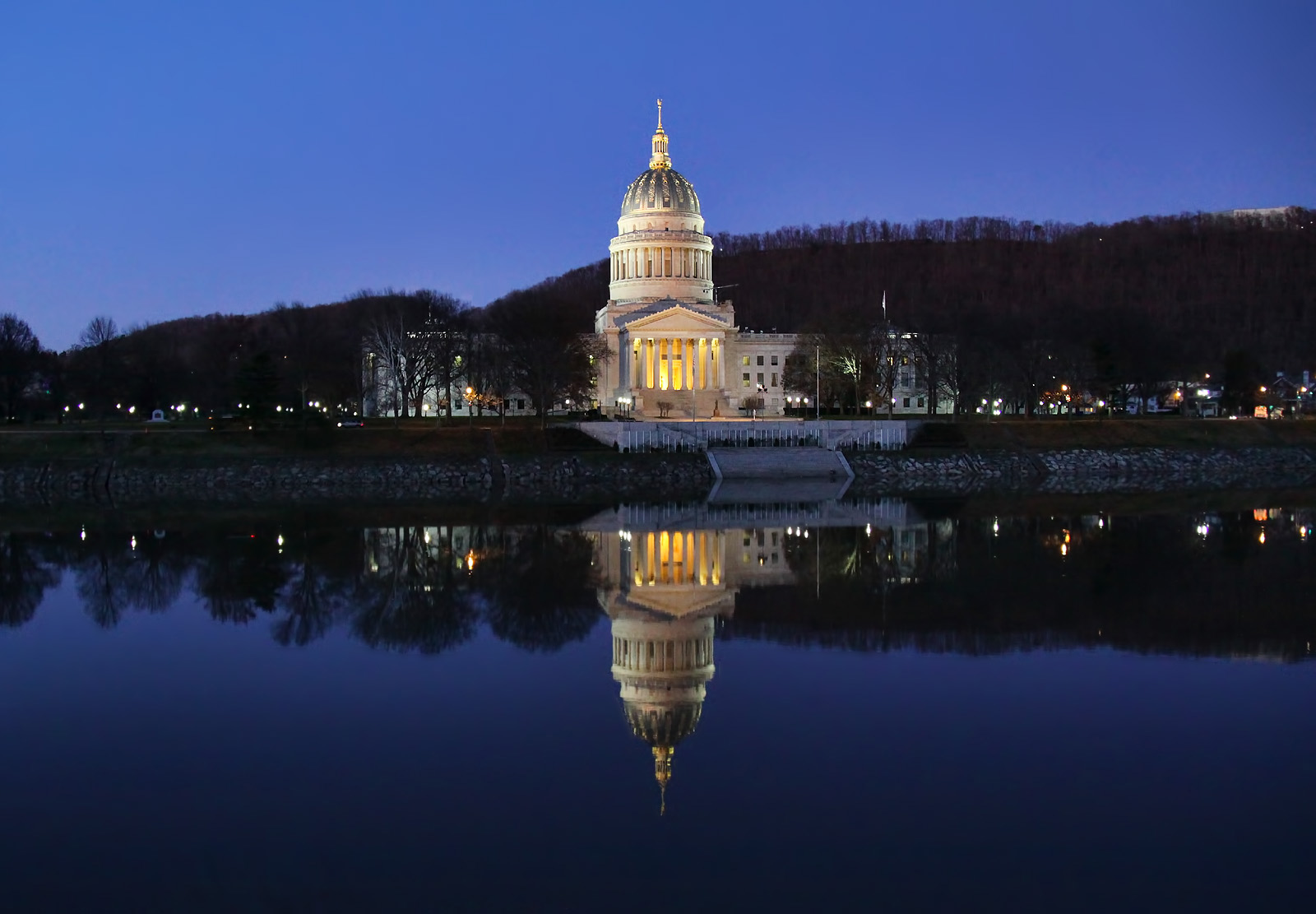
The capitol from across the Kanawha River

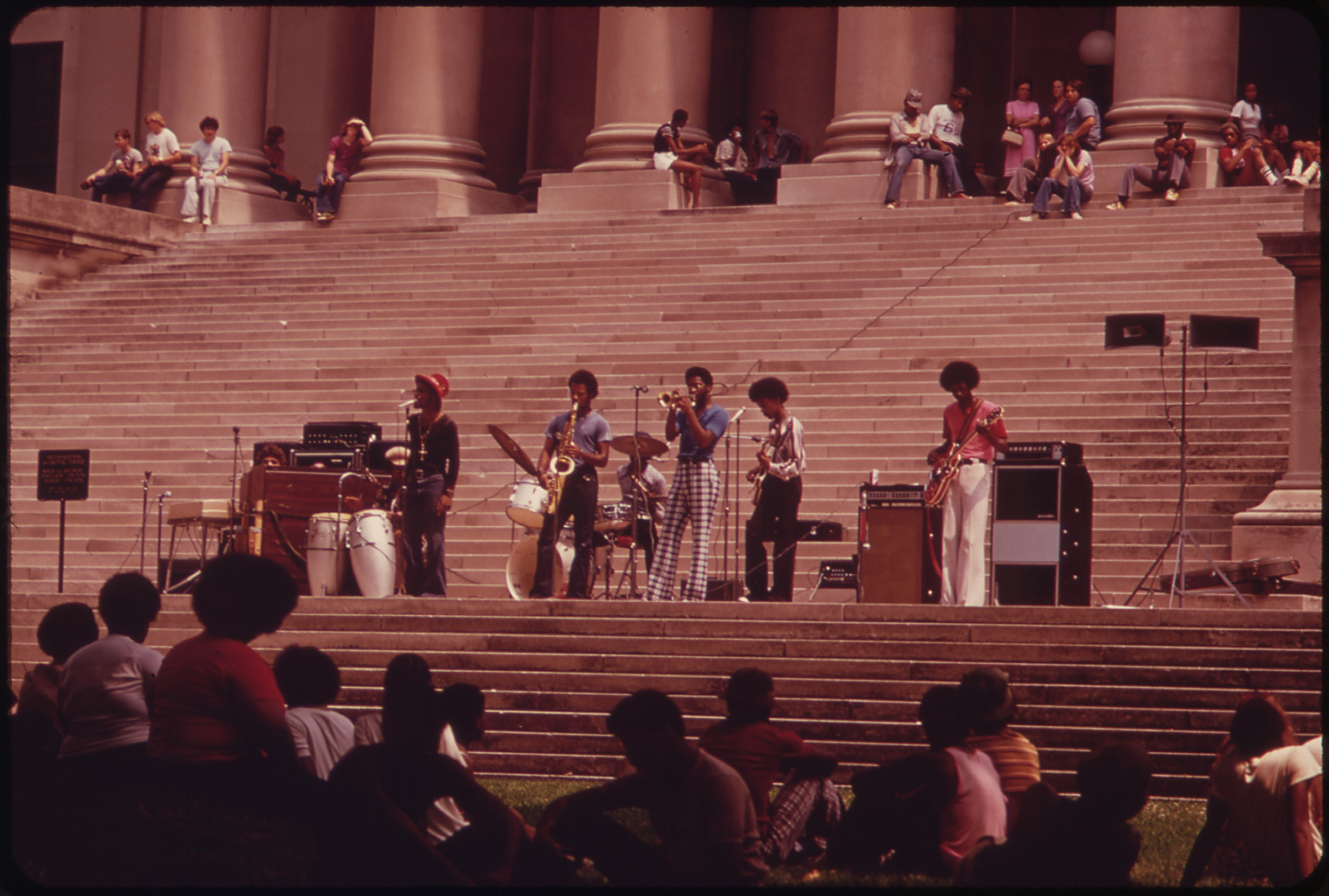
A celebration at the Capitol, 1973

The front of the building faces the Kanawha River, and the entire capitol plaza is bordered by Kanawha Boulevard East (also known as U.S. Route 60 and the Midland Trail), Greenbrier Street (also a part of Route 60 and West Virginia Route 114, where the latter terminates), California Avenue and Piedmont Road. Formerly, Washington Street passed through the plaza, but was closed off for pedestrian use. Beside the main capitol, there are two wings which lie perpendicular to the east and west ends of the building, forming an open-ended quadrangle centered on a fountain, one of three in the plaza. The two wings are connected by low causeways on the basement level. The Governor's mansion, and buildings housing a cultural center as well as several state departments and a parking garage, all occupy the area of the plaza, with several other state departments lying east of California Avenue.

The grounds include several statues, including Abraham Lincoln on the front plaza and Stonewall Jackson, a native of the state, near the southeast corner of the plaza. The Lincoln statue, known as Abraham Lincoln Walks at Midnight by Fred Torrey, depicts the President, who was in office at the time of the state's incorporation, walking at midnight, head bowed, wearing a robe over his clothes, and is located in front of the main entrance of the building, facing the river. There are also two large fountains on the grounds, in the quadrangle just behind the rear entrance of the main building and one to the northwest, between the cultural center and the Division of Motor Vehicles building, just east of the Washington Street entrance to the plaza. Also at the complex are the historic Holly Grove Mansion and the West Virginia Governor's Mansion.

Across from the Capitol complex, between Kanawha Boulevard East and the Kanawha River, lies a plaza around the Zero Mile Marker from which all highway distances in West Virginia were measured. The plaza also includes flagpoles with the American flag and the West Virginia flag as well as staircases down to the banks of the river.

Tours of the Capitol are arranged through the West Virginia Culture Center.

== Dimensions ==
At a height of 292 feet (89 m), the State Capitol is the tallest building in West Virginia.

Dimensions and facts for West Virginia Capitol building	Measurements
Height of dome	292 ft (89.0 m)
Diameter of dome	75 ft (22.9 m)
Floor space	525,000 sq ft (48,774.1 m^{2})
Weight of chandelier in dome	4,000 lb (1,810 kg)
Weight of individual bronze doors on each portico	2,800 lb (1,270 kg)
Height of eagle on top of dome	5 ft (1.5 m)

== Popular culture ==
- The West Virginia State Capitol is a location in Fallout 76, as Charleston Capitol Building

== Gallery ==
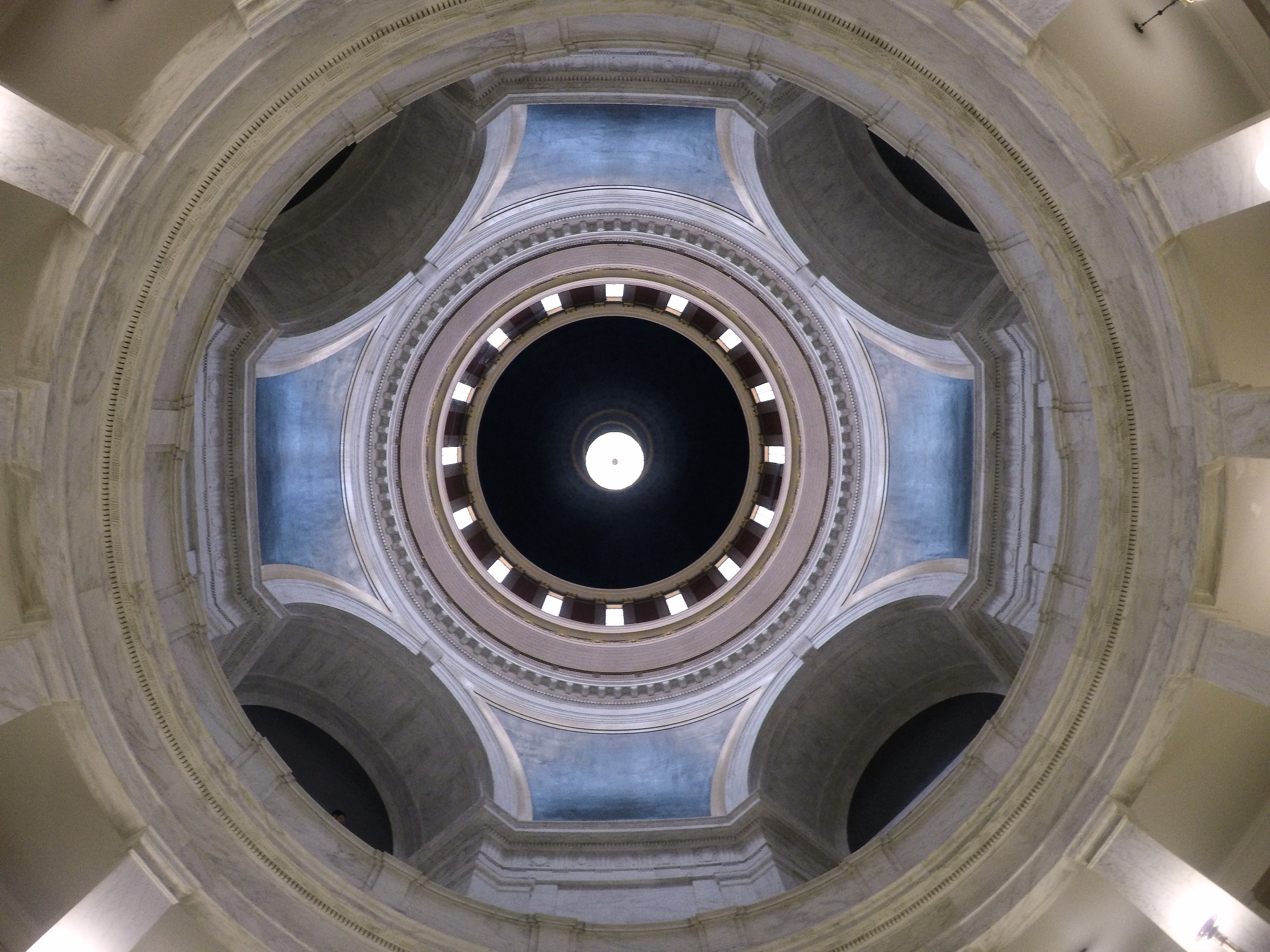
West Virginia Capitol Dome interior View

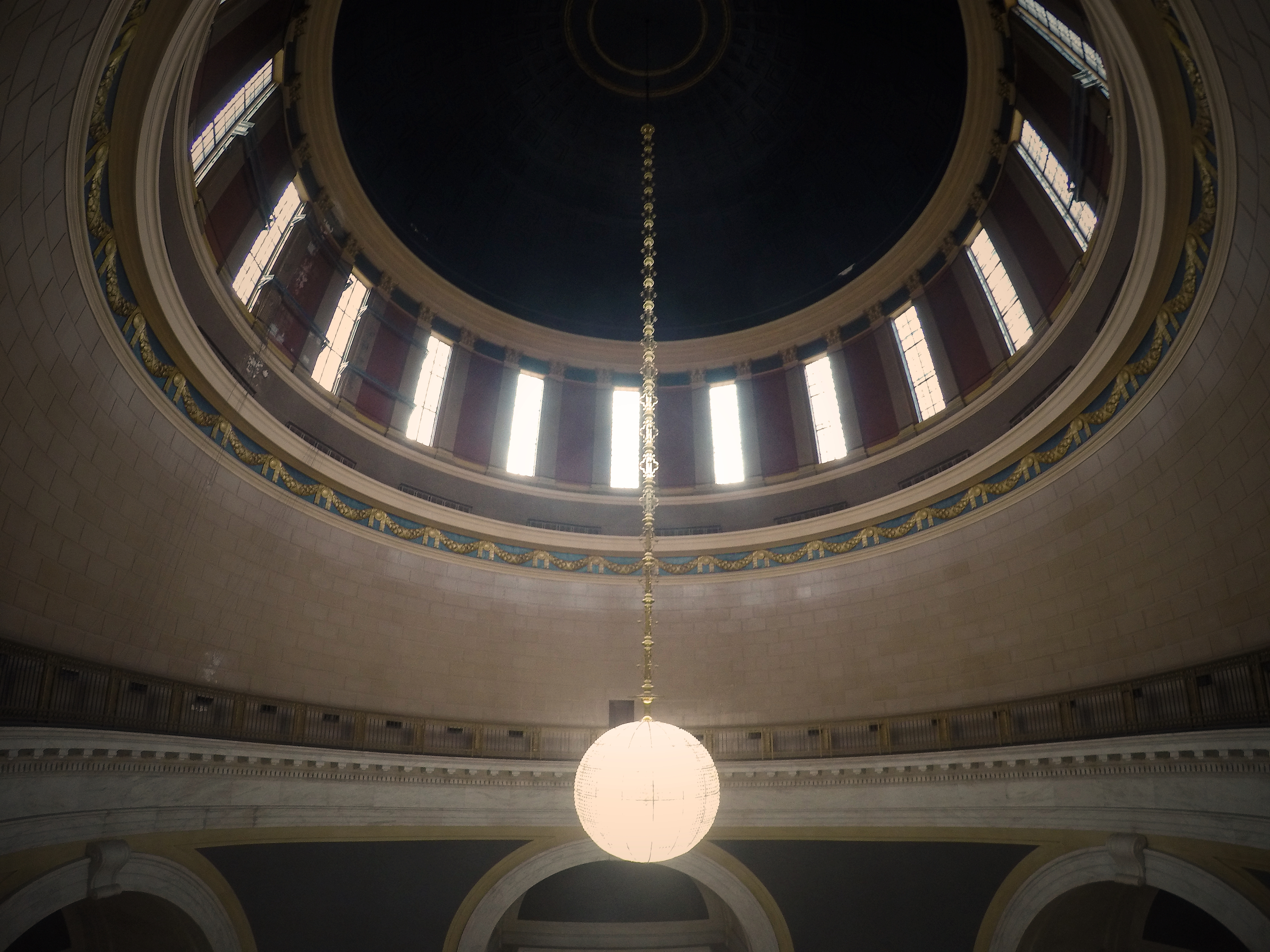
Garlands motif at base of WV Capitol dome with chandelier

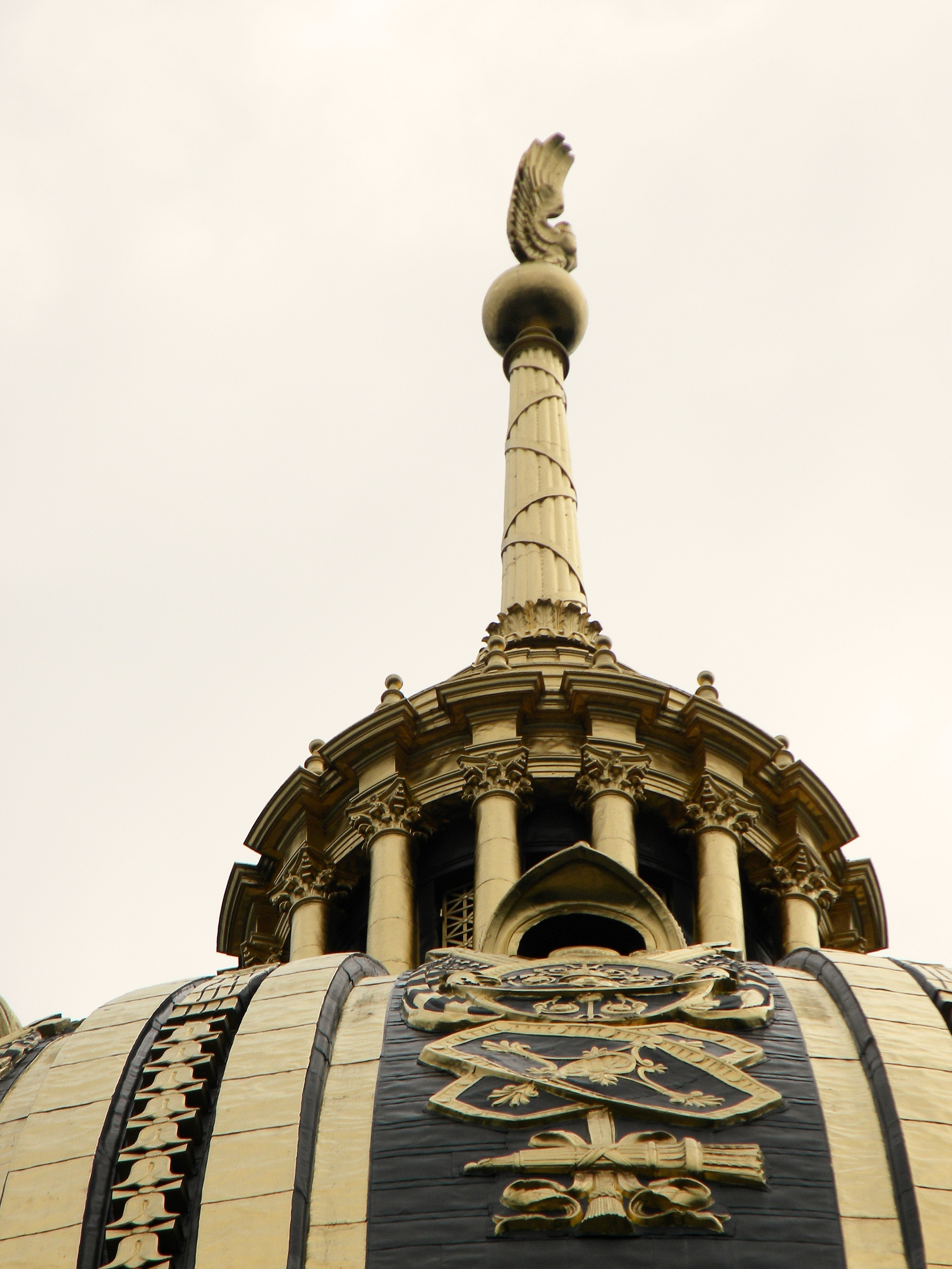
Detail of WV Capitol Dome in Charleston West Virginia

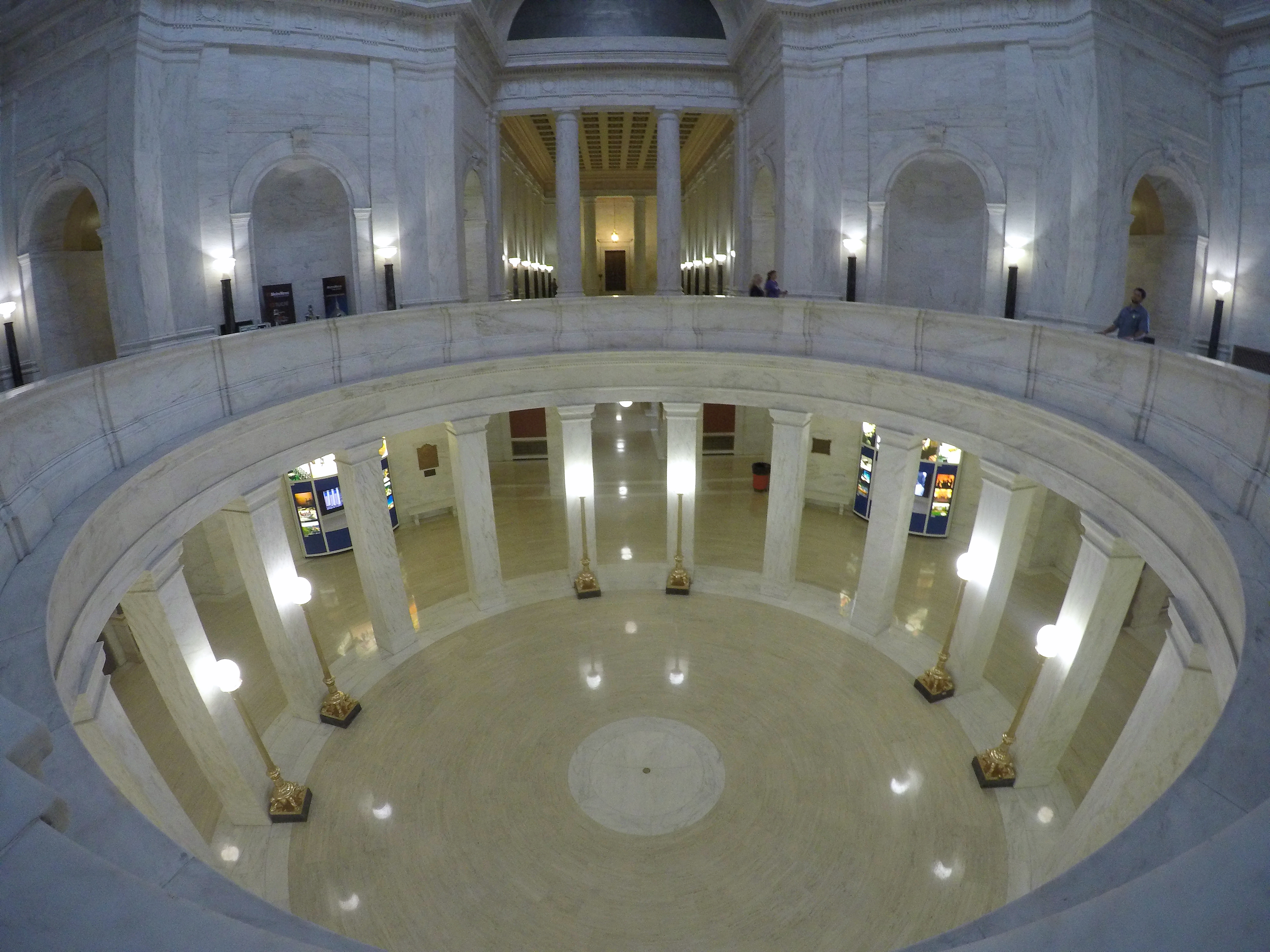
Interior of West Virginia Capitol

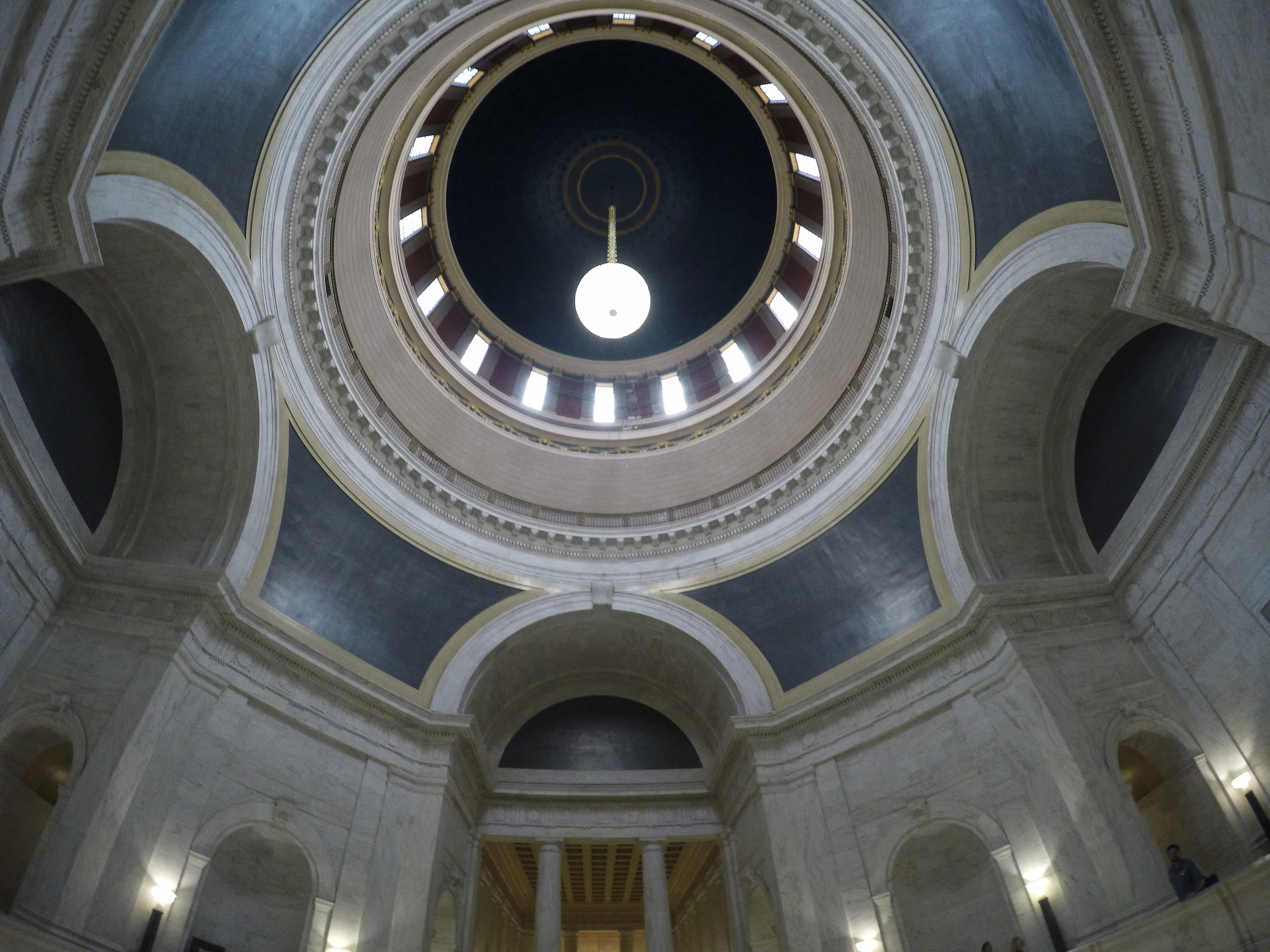
West Virginia Capitol Dome architecture

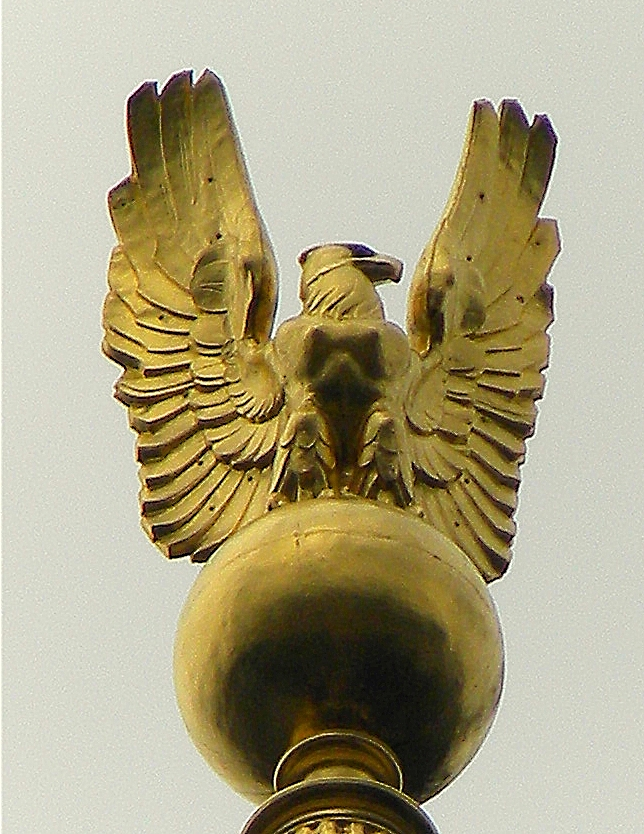
Eagle on West Virginia Capitol Dome

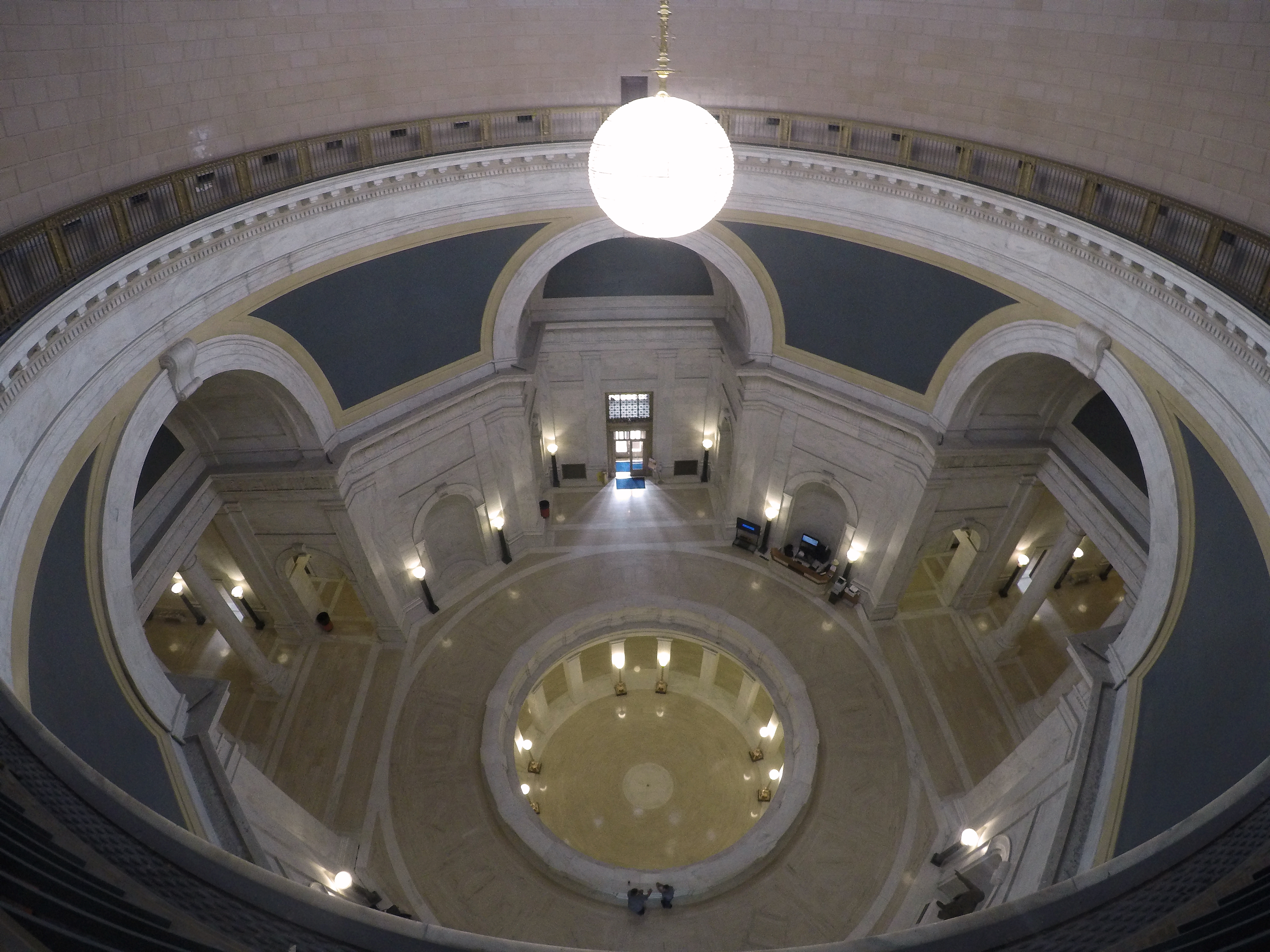
High View of Capitol Rotunda well

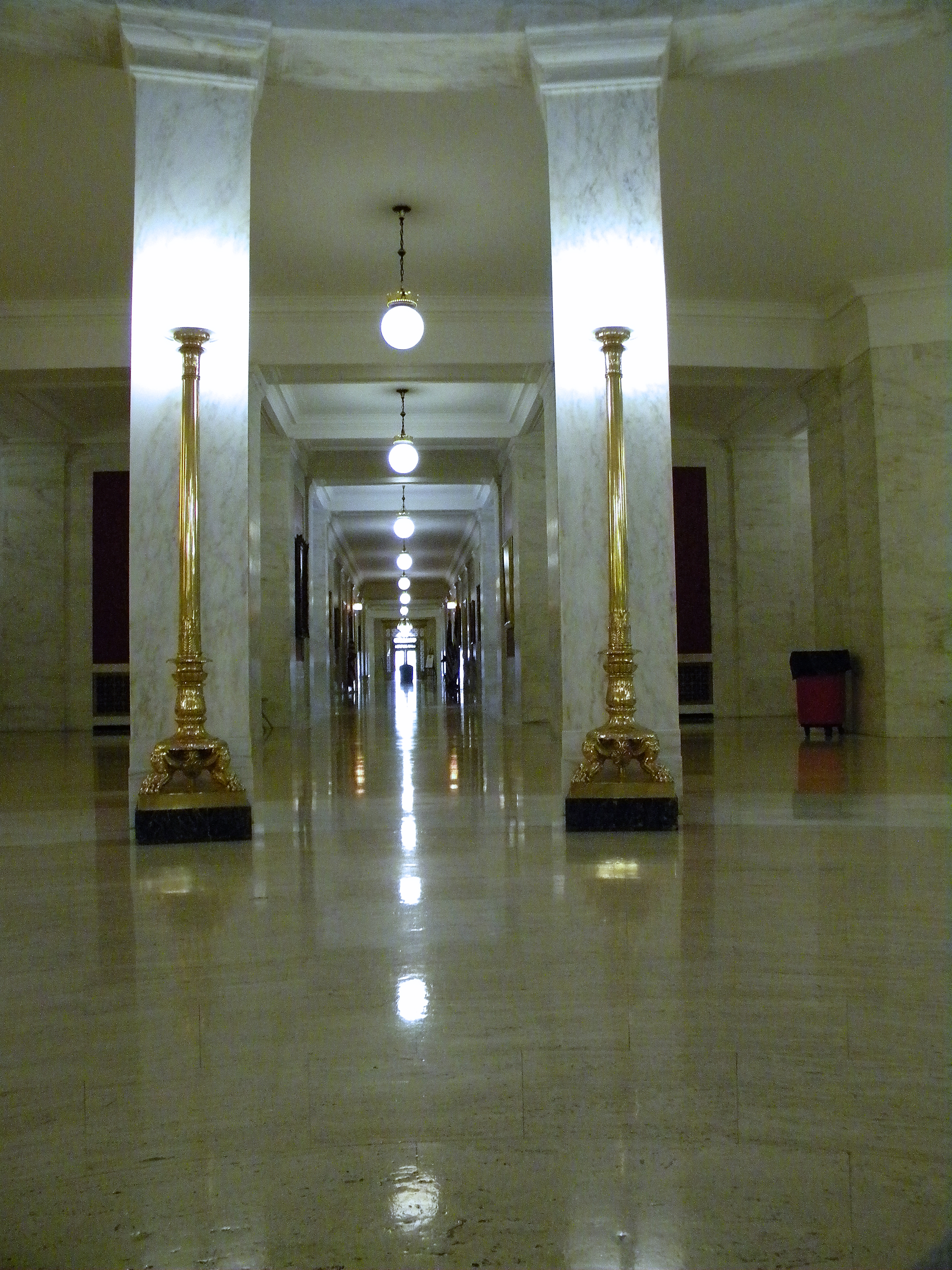
Capitol rotunda

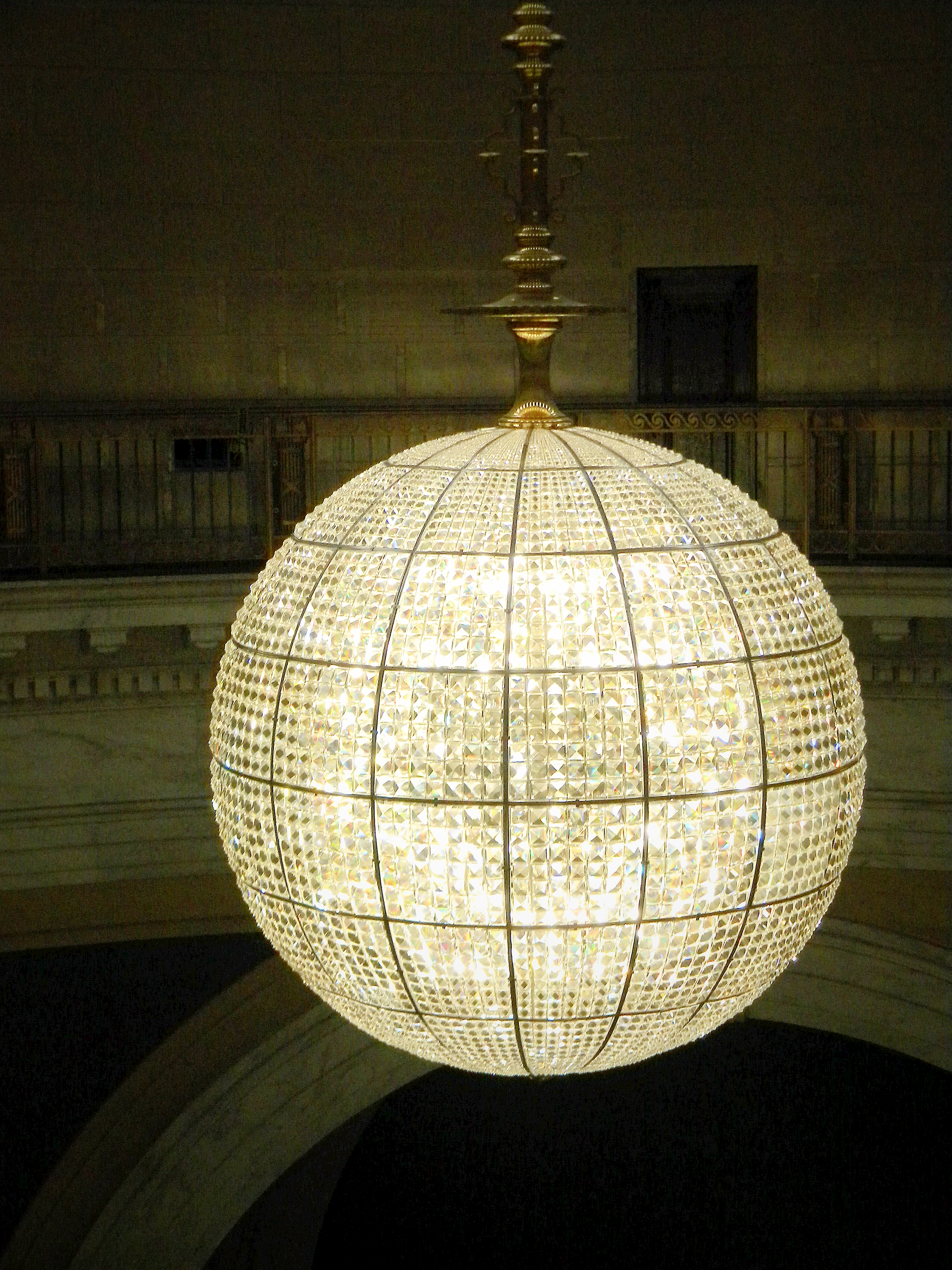
Capitol dome chandelier

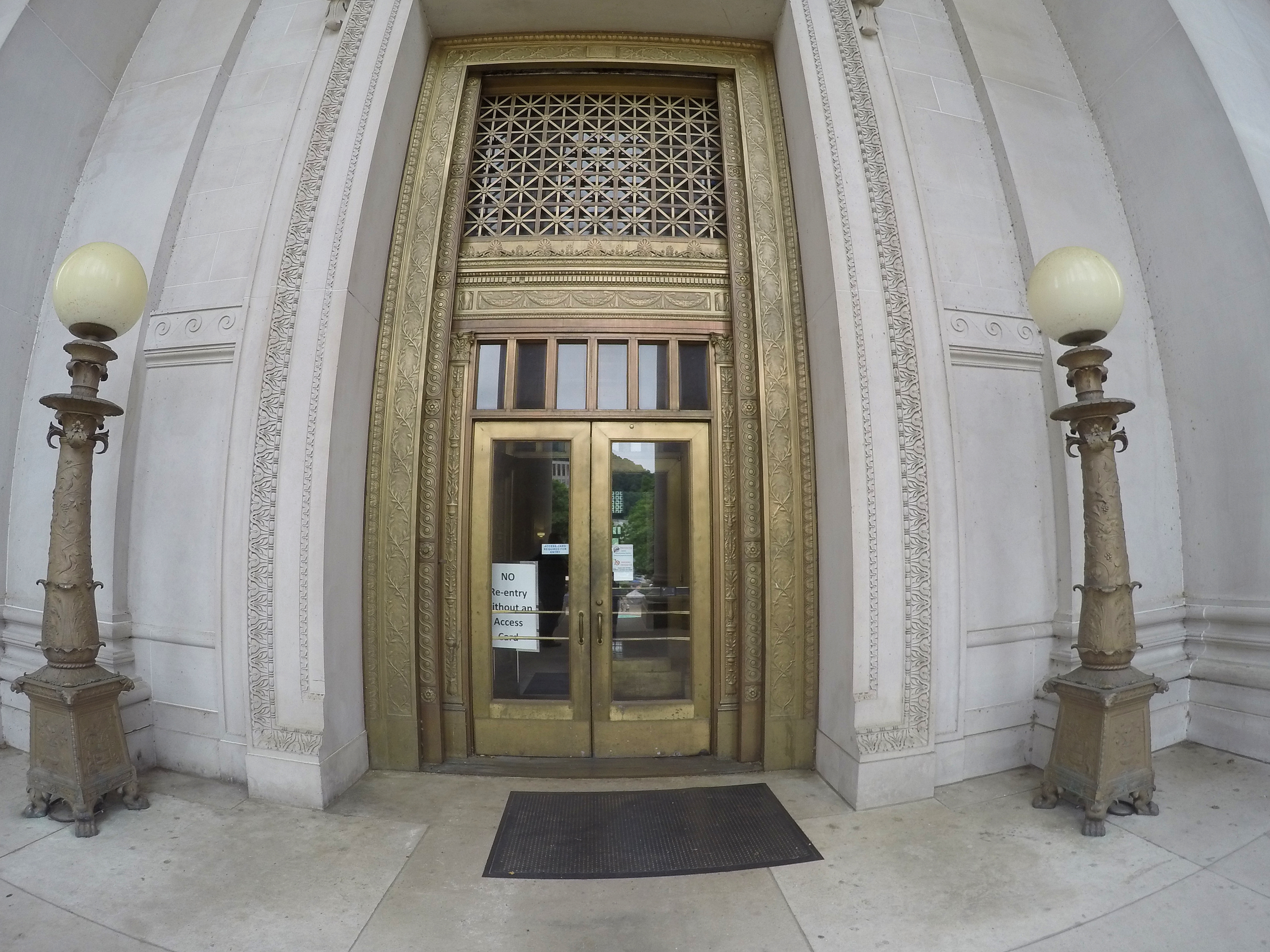
Front entrance door

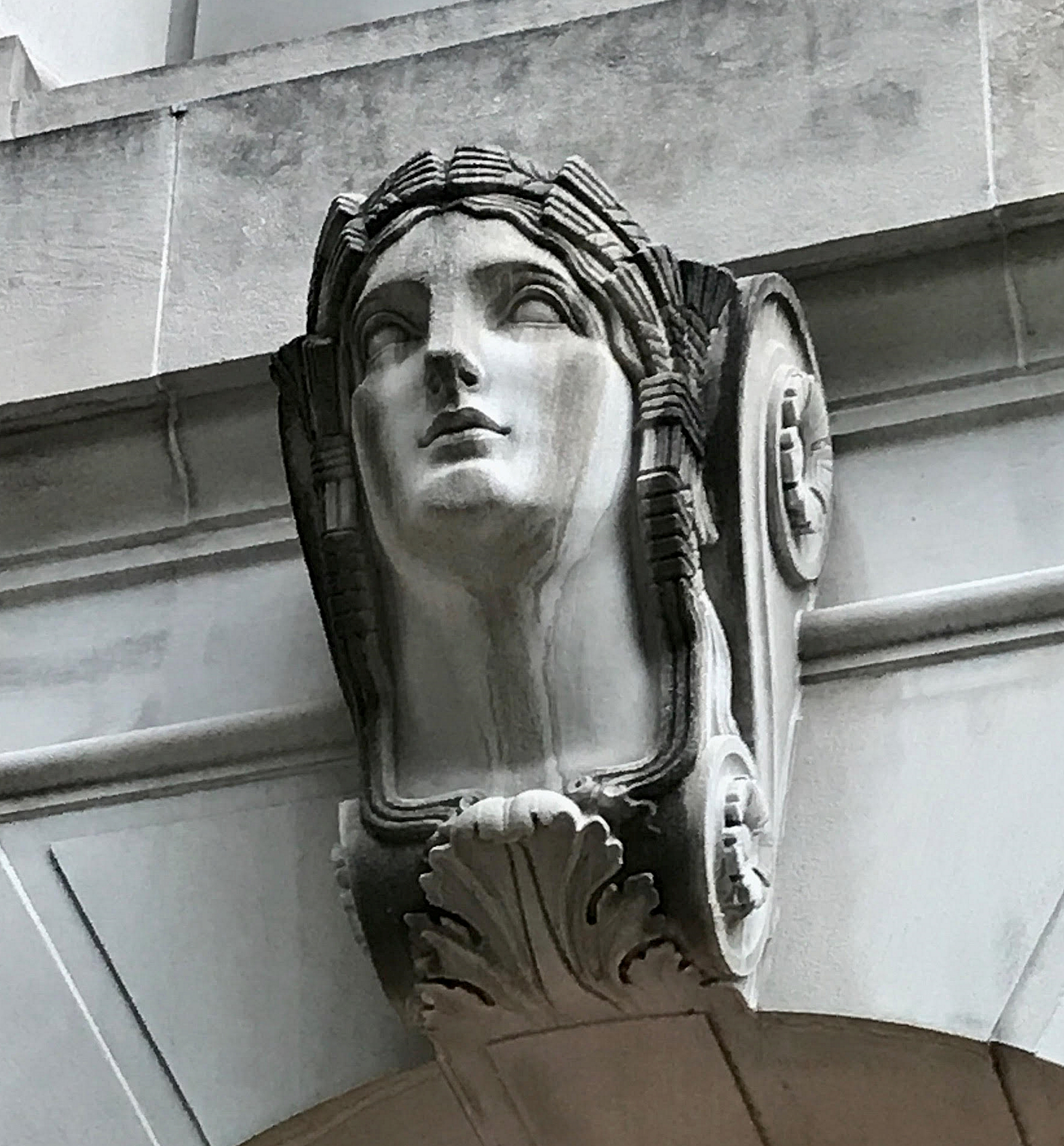
Ceres figure in West Wing

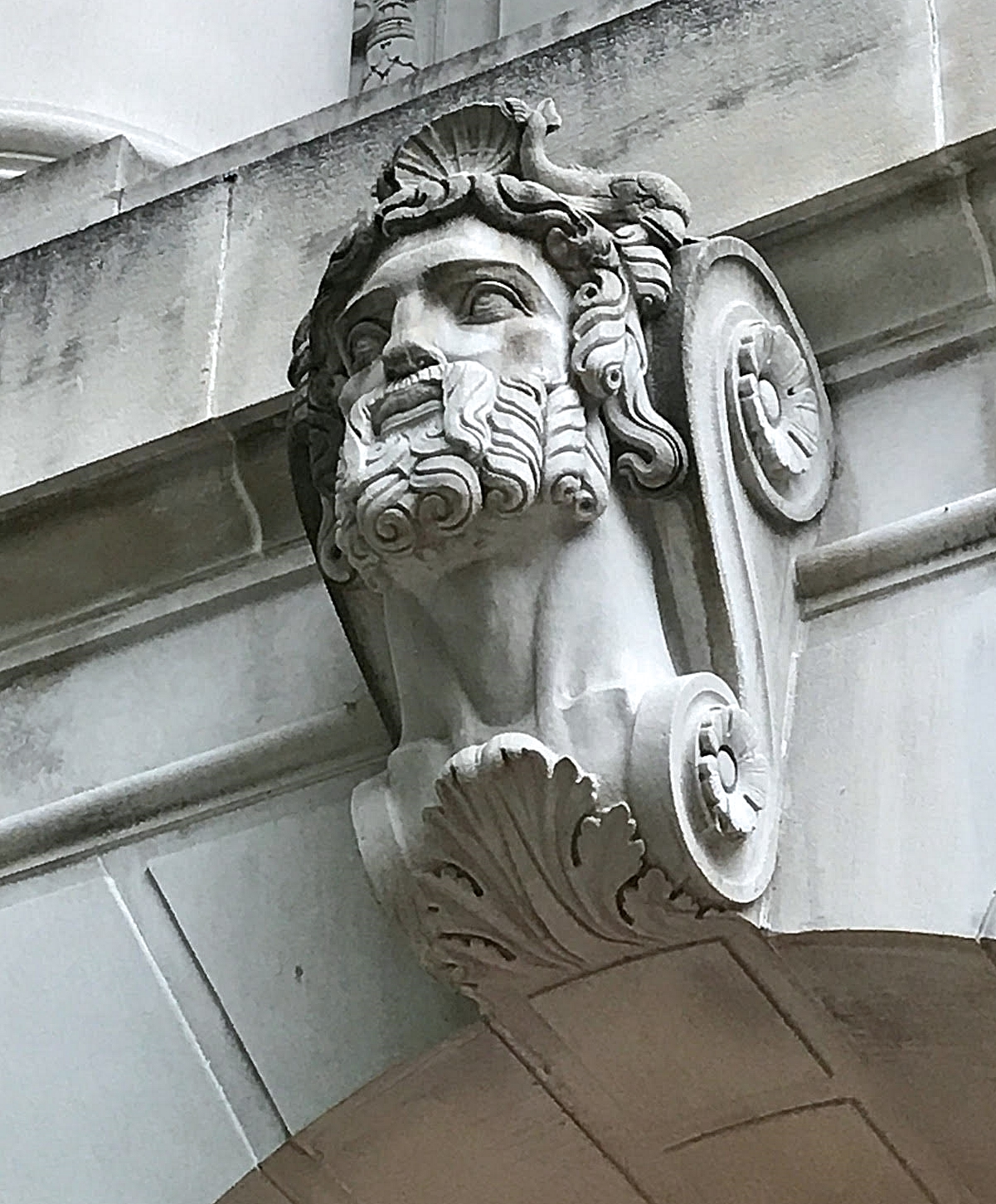
Neptune figure in West Wing

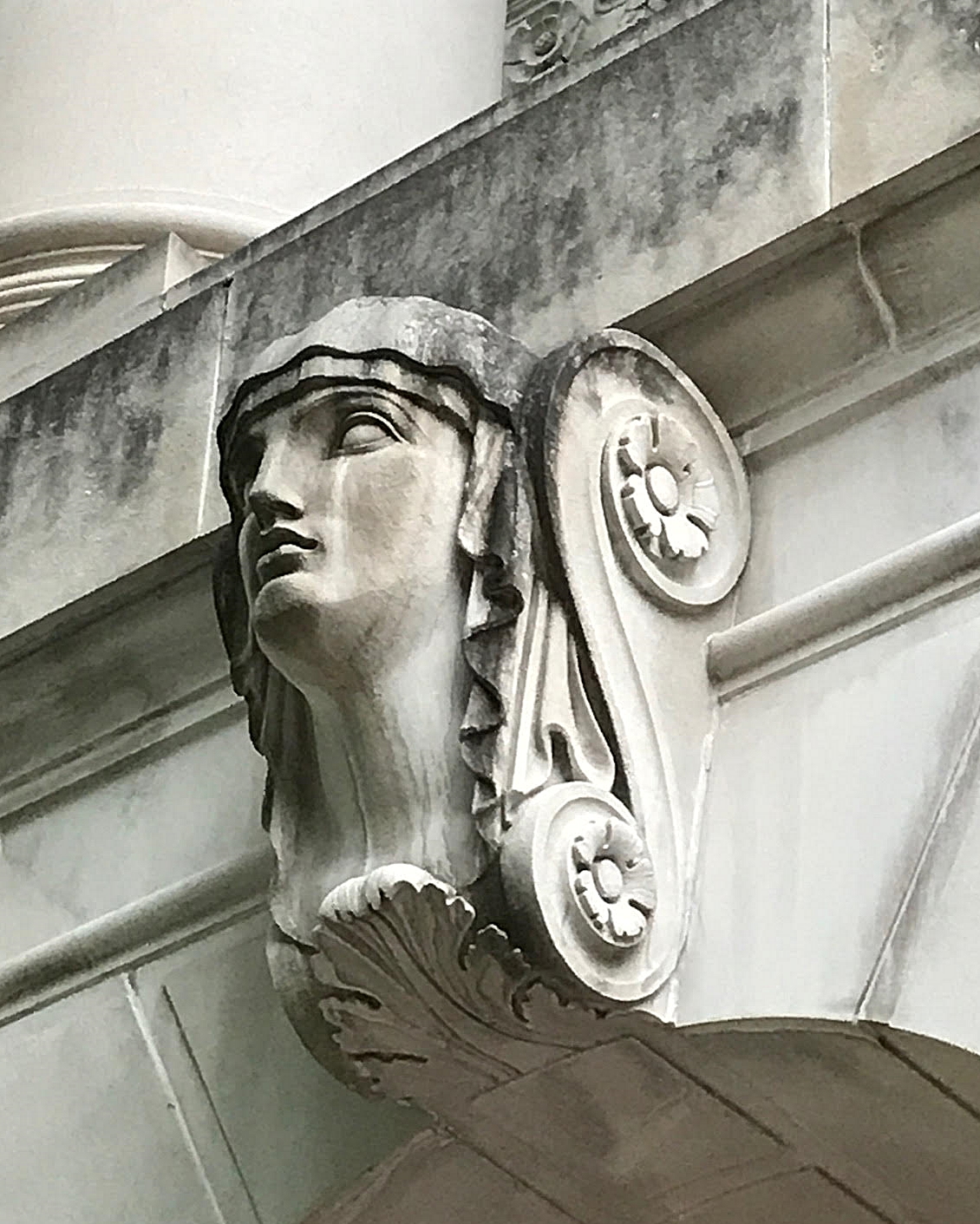
Vesta figure in West Wing

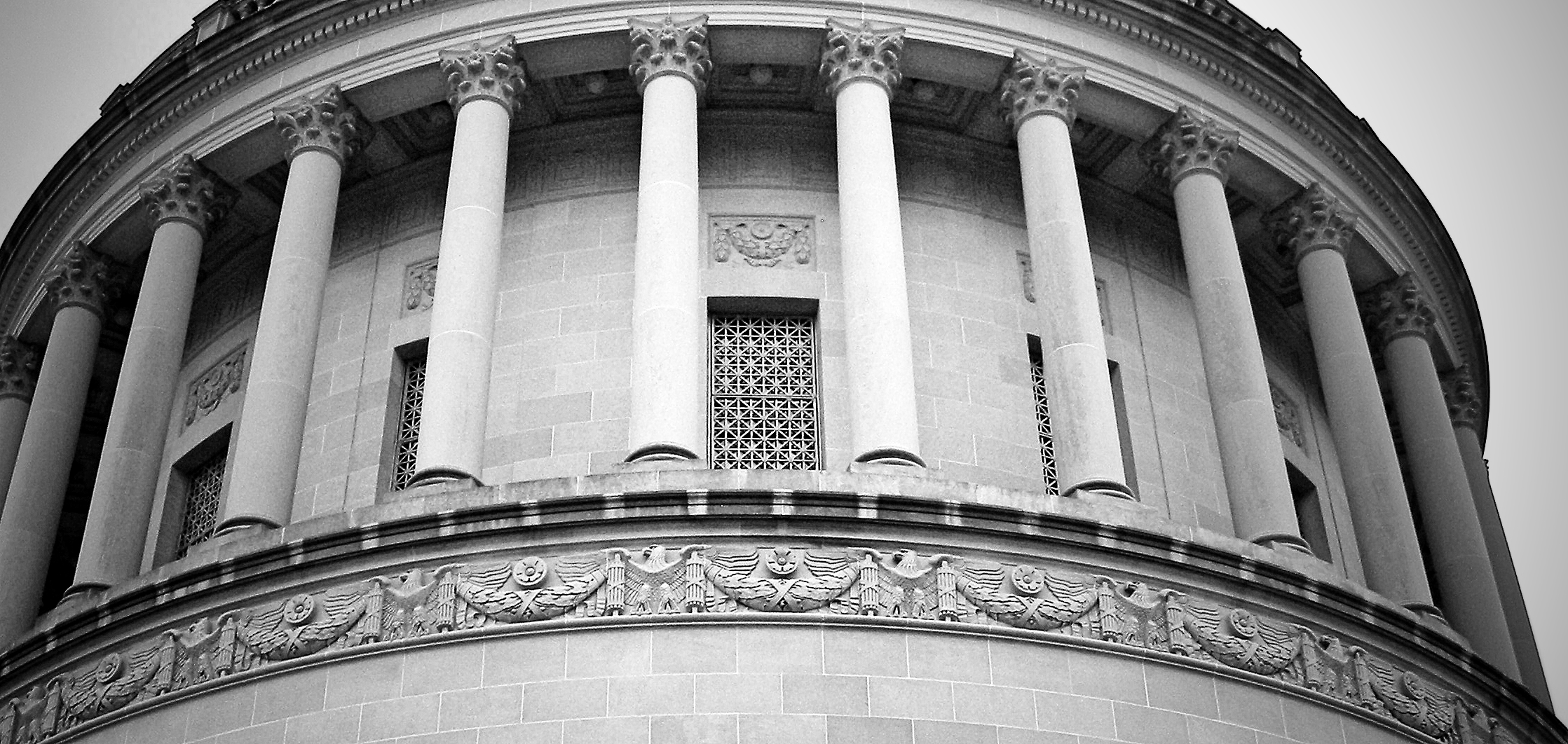
WV Capitol Corinthian Column details with eagle and garland motif

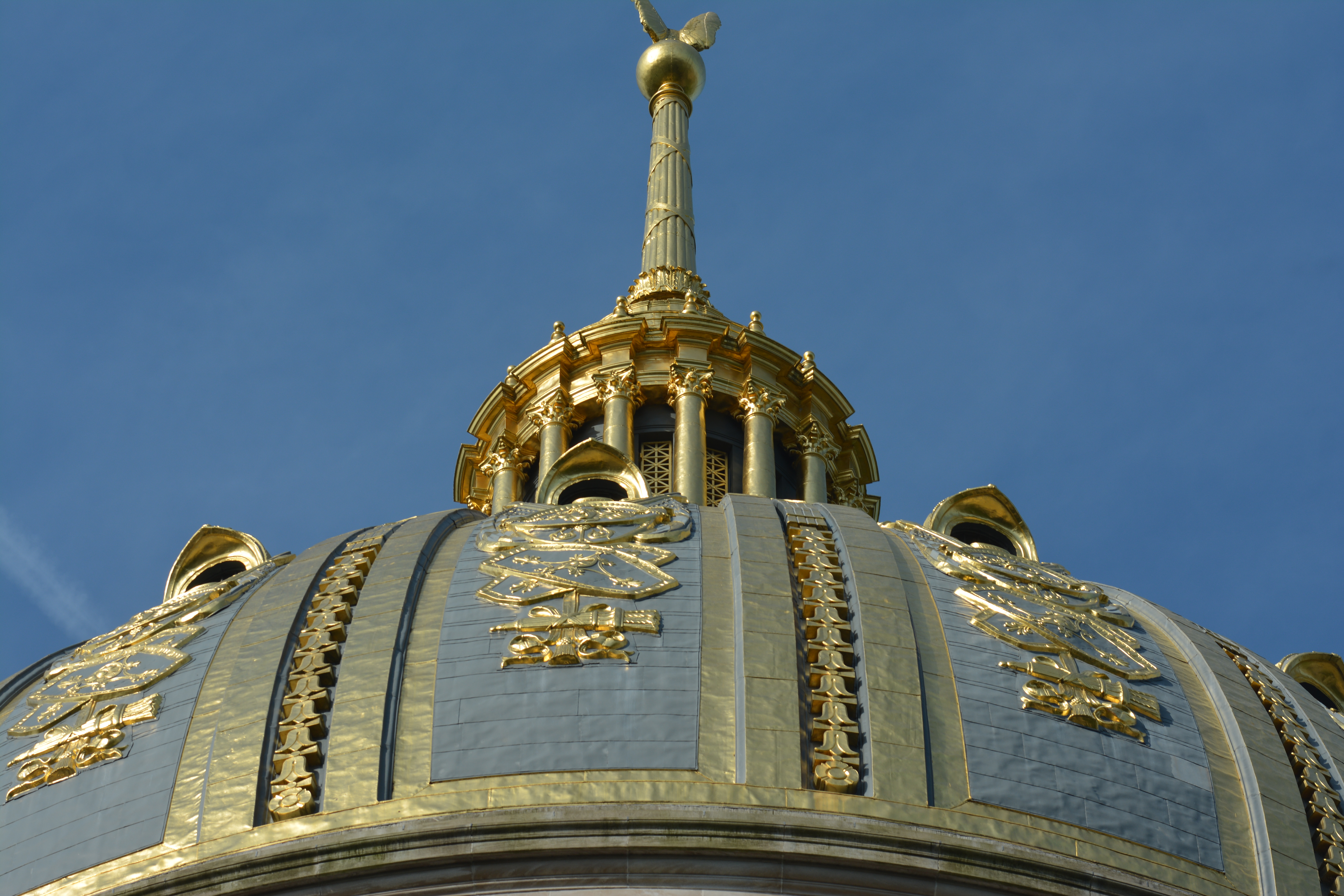
Further Detail of West Virginia Capitol Dome

== See also ==
- West Virginia Governor's Mansion
- List of West Virginia state legislatures
- List of state and territorial capitols in the United States
- List of tallest buildings in West Virginia
