= Union Building, Toronto =

Coordinates: 43.64766°N 79.38645°W

212 King Street West
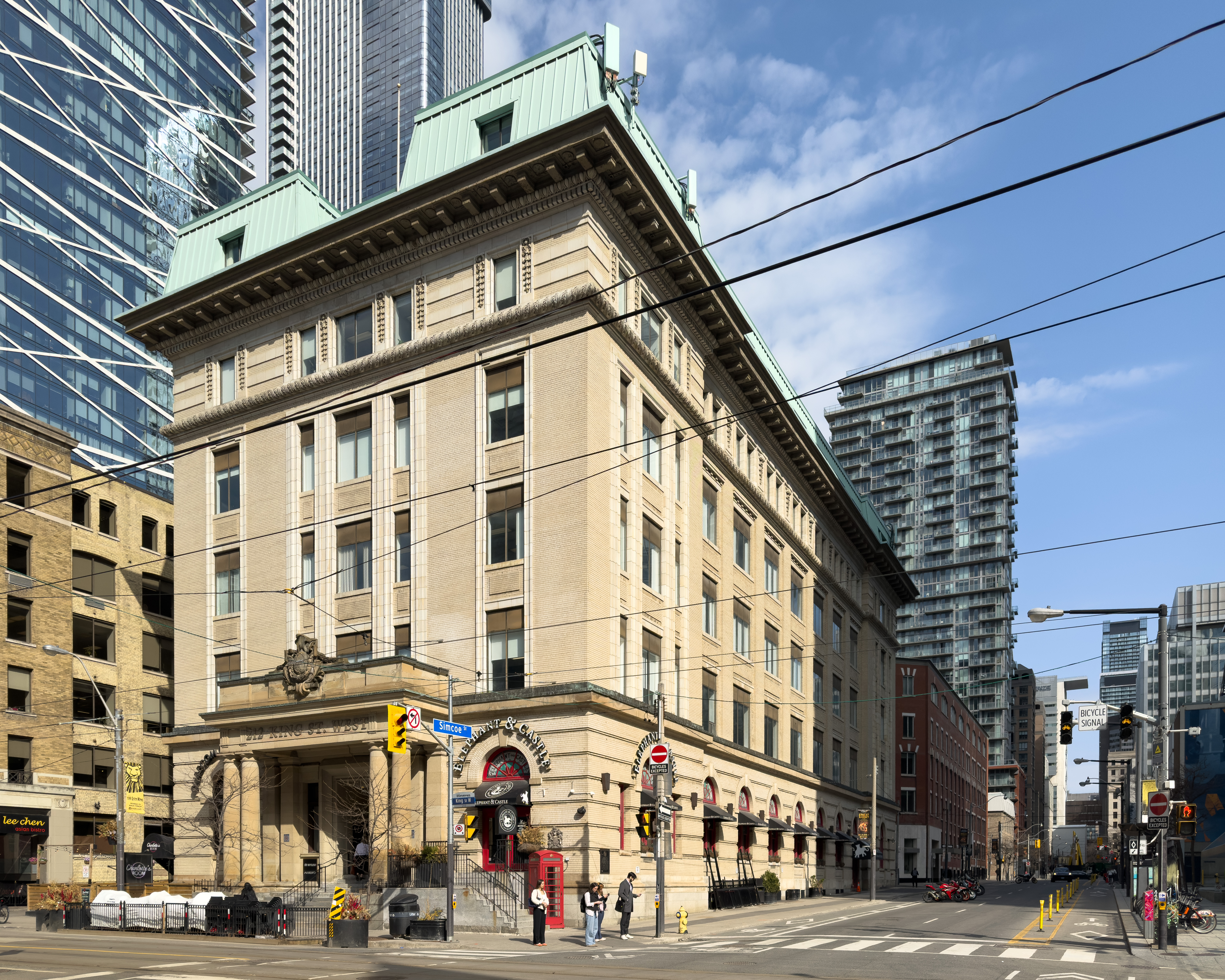
- Interactive map of the 212 King Street West area

General information
- Status: Proposed
- Type: Residential / Office
- Location: Toronto, Canada, 212 King Street West
- Completed: 2026
- Height: 310 metres (1,020 ft)

Technical details
- Floor count: 79

Design and construction
- Architect: SHoP Architects

The Union Building is an older building in Toronto that has been described as an "architectural gem". When it was built, in 1908, on the Northwest corner of King and Simcoe streets, it was directly across from the palatial official residence of the Lieutenant Governor of Ontario.

The six story structure was built on a site that was originally part of the home of Upper Canada College. The building was designed by the firm Darling and Pearson, and was originally known as the Canadian General Electric Company Building. A seventh floor and copper clad mansard roof was added in the 1980s.

In 2010 City of Toronto government staff recommended the building be granted heritage protection under the Ontario Heritage Act. The building had been listed on the City's Inventory of Heritage Properties since 2007.

In December 2020, a 310-metre (1,020 ft) high addition to the Union Building was proposed with a planned completion date of 2026. If it is built, it will become one of the tallest buildings in Canada.
