= West Virginia Building =

Tallest Building in Huntington, WV

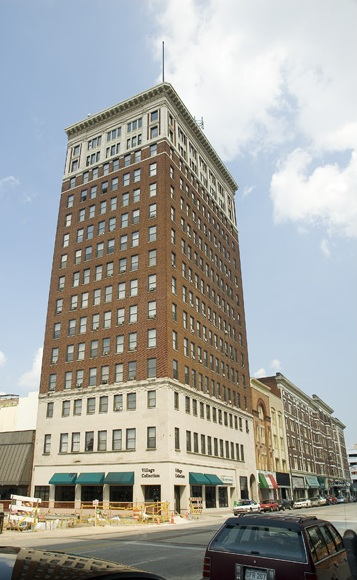
- West Virginia Building in 2006.
- Interactive map of the West Virginia Building area
- Former names: Union Bank, Trust Building

General information
- Status: Open
- Type: Office Building
- Architectural style: Renaissance Revival-style
- Location: 910 4th Ave, Huntington, West Virginia 25701, Huntington, West Virginia, USA
- Coordinates: 38°25′15.456″N 82°26′37.212″W
- Opened: 1925

Height
- Height: 200 ft/61 m

Technical details
- Floor count: 15

Design and construction
- Architecture firm: Meanor & Handloser

The West Virginia Building is the tallest building in Huntington, West Virginia and the 10th tallest building in West Virginia.

== History ==
In 1924, the Union Bank and Trust Company commissioned the architectural firm Meanor & Handloser to design a Renaissance Revival-style office building at the corner of 9th Street and 4th Avenue. The fifteen-story structure featured an ashlar stone façade on the bottom and top floors, with brick in between. Initially, this building served as the new home for the Union Bank and Trust Company, replacing their previous frame structure on the same corner.

Despite extensive promotion during its construction, the Union Bank and Trust Company closed following the 1929 stock market crash. In 1943, a local businessman purchased the building and renamed it the West Virginia Building, the state's tallest commercial building.

=== Walgreens Era ===
In 1937, the building's first floor was remodeled to house a Walgreens Drug Store. One of its employees, Virginia Ruth Egnor, later became the 1950s television star Dagmar. The Walgreens store closed in 1961 when the company declined to renew its lease. Thrift Drug Company briefly occupied the space afterward.

=== WSAZ and Broadcasting ===
In 1949, when news station WSAZ transitioned from radio to television, their offices were temporarily located in the West Virginia Building to utilize its height for broadcasting. Notably, in 1950, the station crew broadcast a live fire from a building window at The Tipon Theater.

=== Later Use and Renovations ===
In 2007, the building was acquired by Well Street Properties, LLC, a New York-based company. Alex Vence purchased it in 2013 and continued renovations to create upscale luxury apartments. Notable improvements included cosmetic upgrades to the exterior and installing a multi-colored LED lighting system on the top two floors, modeled after the Empire State Building's lighting system, which changes colors to commemorate various events and holidays.

== See also ==
- Cityscape of Huntington, West Virginia
- Downtown Huntington Historic District
- List of tallest buildings in West Virginia
