= United Carbon Building =

- U.S. National Register of Historic Places
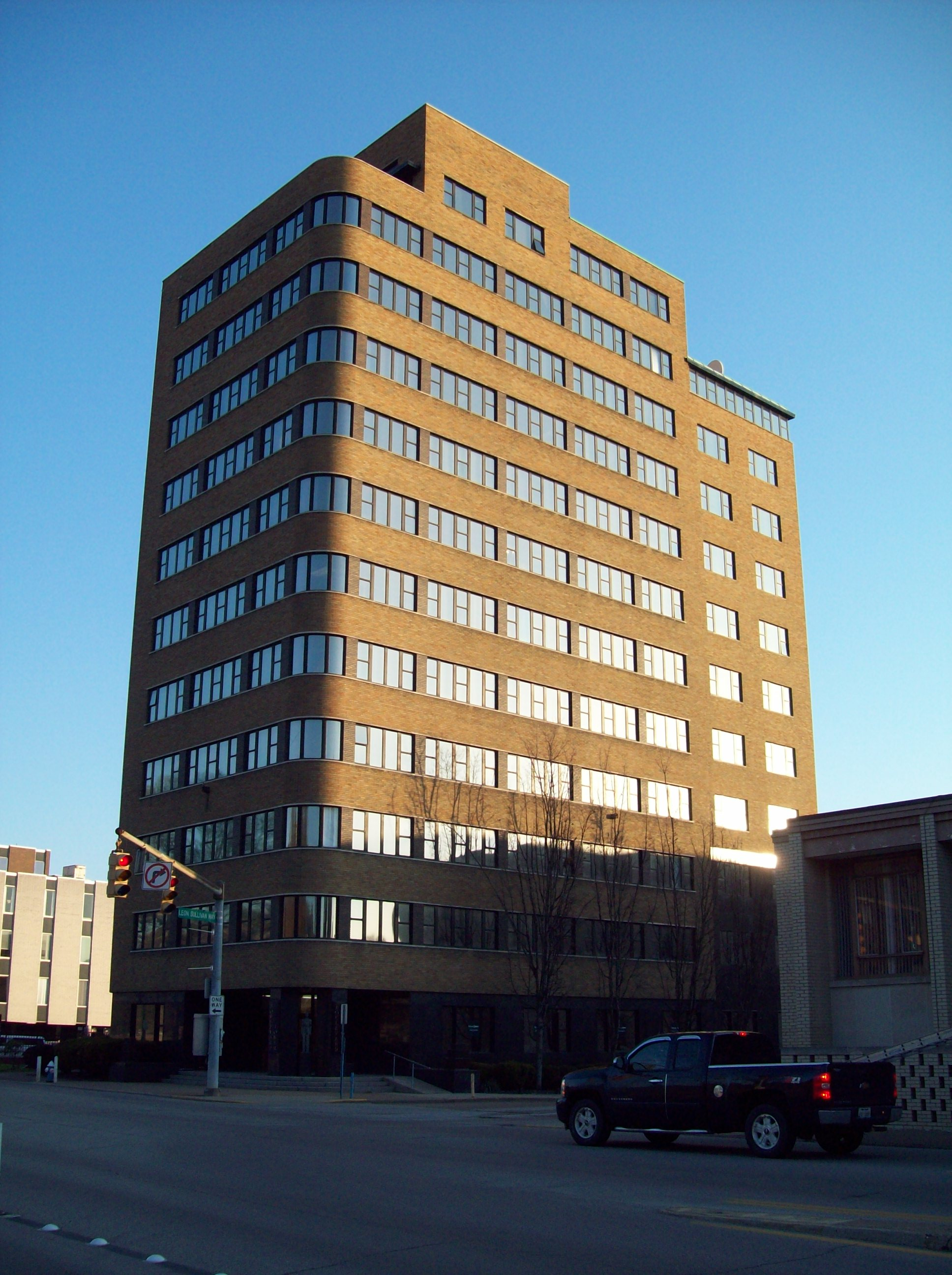
- United Carbon Building, April 2009

- Location within West Virginia Location within the United States
- Location: 1018 Kanawha Blvd., E., Charleston, West Virginia
- Coordinates: 38°20′46″N 81°38′4″W
- Built: 1940
- Architect: Walter F. Martens; H. B. Agsten & Sons
- Architectural style: International Style, Moderne
- NRHP reference No.: 94000720
- Added to NRHP: July 15, 1994

United Carbon Building, also known as Boulevard Tower, Stanley Building, and Nelson Building, is a historic office building located at Charleston, West Virginia. It is a 12-story, steel-framed building sheathed in a smooth, unornamented shell of gold-colored brick, black steel and glass. Its slender volume rises 157 feet from the sidewalk to the twelfth-floor penthouse, which once served as the office of the building's prominent patron, Oscar Nelson (1879-1953). Mr. Nelson, president of the United Carbon Company, commissioned architect Walter F. Martens to design the structure. The building was commissioned in 1939 as the national headquarters for the United Carbon Company, which occupied the ninth through the twelfth floors until 1950.

It was listed on the National Register of Historic Places in 1994.

Its current list of tenants includes Bankers Life and Casualty Company.

== Gallery ==
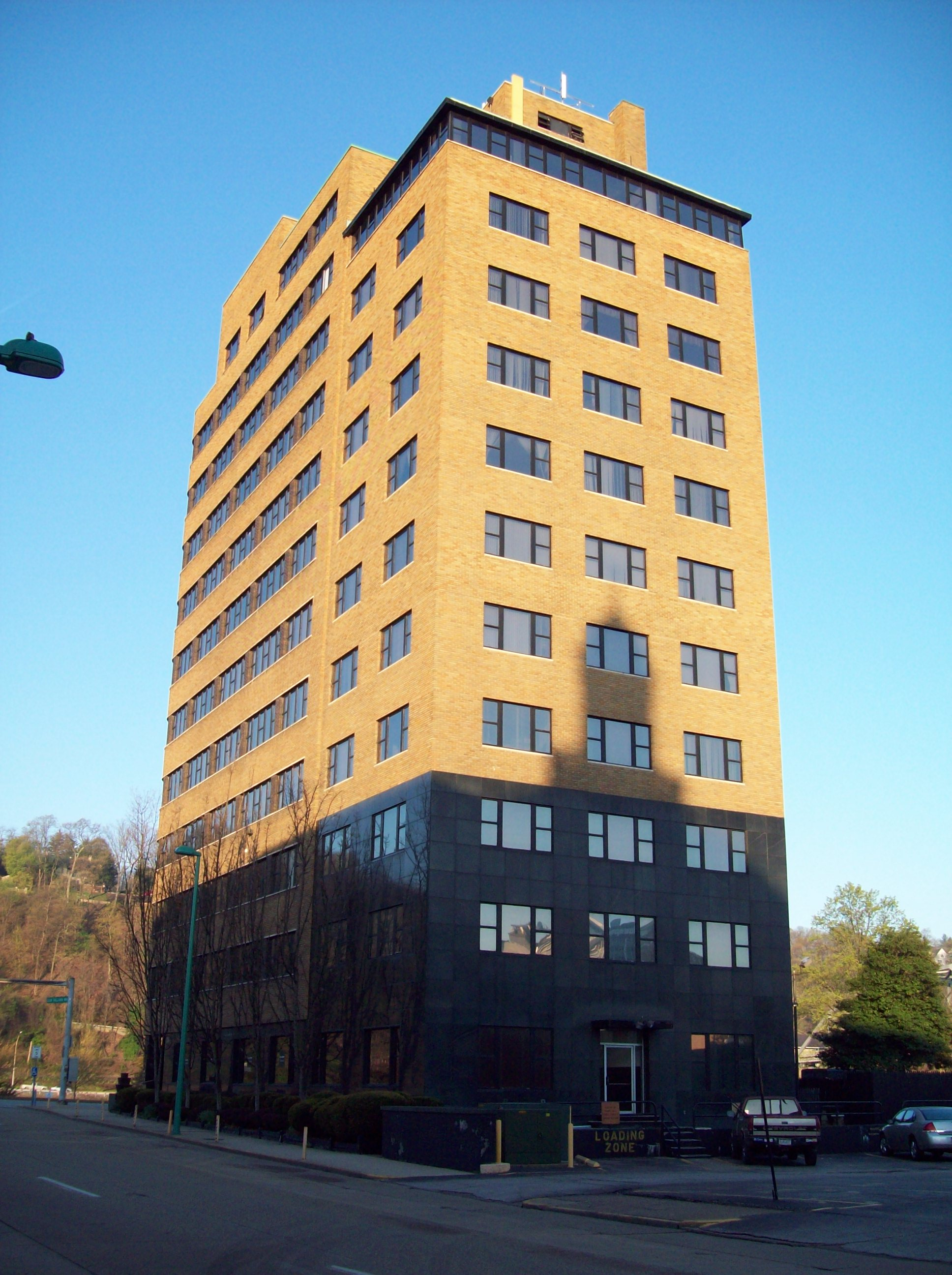
United Carbon Building (Rear View), April 2009

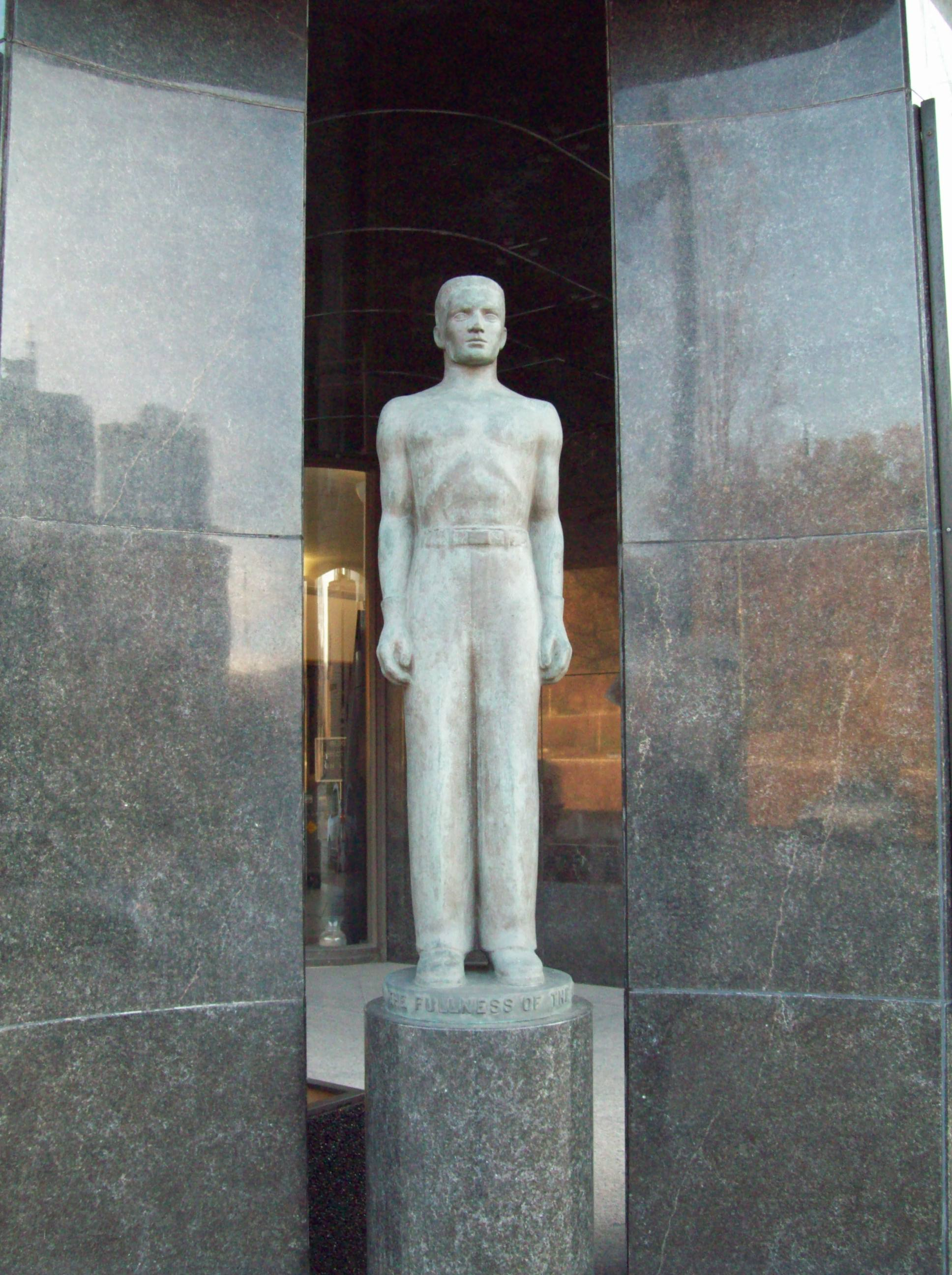
United Carbon Building (Entry Statue, "From the Fullness of the Earth"), April 2009
