= Daniel Boone Hotel (Charleston, West Virginia) =

- U.S. National Register of Historic Places
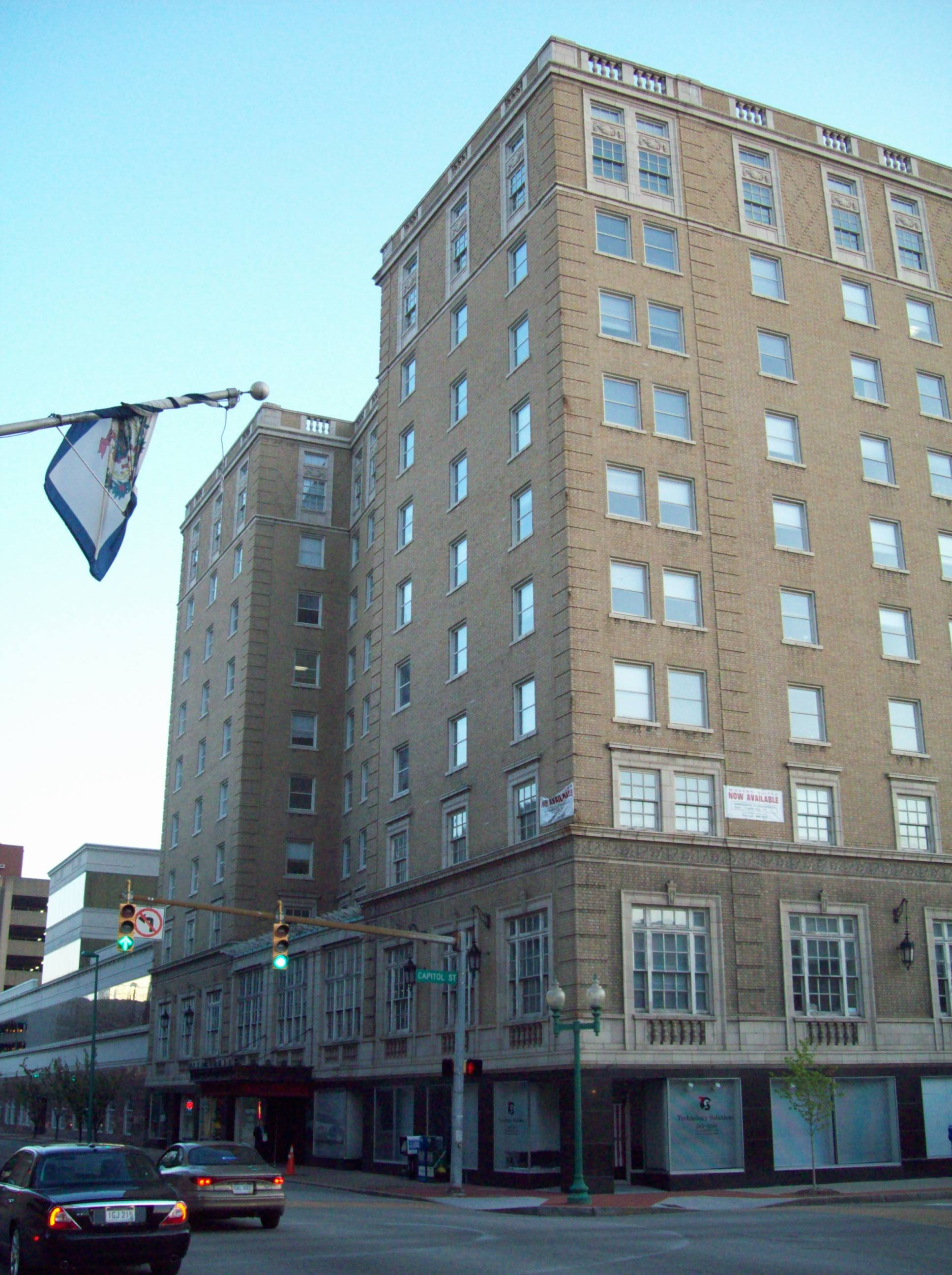
- Daniel Boone Hotel, April 2009

- Location within West Virginia Location within the United States
- Location: 405 Capitol St., Charleston, West Virginia
- Coordinates: 38°21′5″N 81°37′56″W
- Built: 1927–1929
- Architect: Stoddart, W. L.; Higginbotham, A. G., Co.
- Architectural style: Classical Revival
- NRHP reference No.: 84003602
- Added to NRHP: August 21, 1984

Daniel Boone Hotel is a historic hotel located at Charleston, West Virginia. It is a Classical Revival Style ten story structure with blond brick exterior and tan, modular, stone-looking terra cotta. The building was originally constructed in 1927–1929, expanded in 1936 and again in 1949 to provide a total of 465 rooms, a large ballroom and 3 parlor meeting rooms. The overall effect of the facade is to create the common early 20th Century "Skyscraper" look of "Base", two story mezzanine—"Shaft" five stories of 1/1 and 1 story of 6/6 windows—and "Capital" tenth story diamond brick and terra cotta balustrade. The building is U-shaped in plan. In the early-1980s the building was extensively renovated to become an office building.

It was listed on the National Register of Historic Places in 1984.
